= Llandwrog =

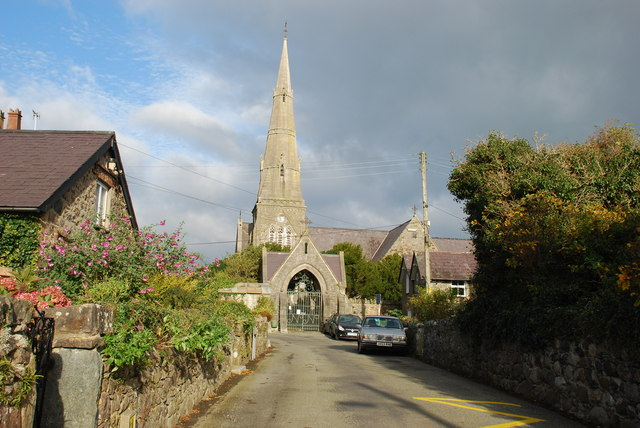
- Llandwrog village centre

- Location within Gwynedd
- Population: 2,539 (2011)
- OS grid reference: SH450560
- Community: Llandwrog
- Principal area: Gwynedd
- Country: Wales
- Sovereign state: United Kingdom
- Post town: CAERNARFON
- Postcode district: LL54
- Dialling code: 01286
- Police: North Wales
- Fire: North Wales
- Ambulance: Welsh
- UK Parliament: Dwyfor Meirionnydd
- Senedd Cymru – Welsh Parliament: Arfon
- List of places UK Wales Gwynedd 53.079°N 4.314°W Map of the community

Llandwrog (Welsh pronunciation; 'the church of saint Twrog') is a village and community in Gwynedd, north-west Wales, most notable for the presence of the headquarters of Welsh record label Sain and the site of Caernarfon Airport. It has a population of 2,466, increasing to 2,539 at the 2011 Census. The community includes the villages of Groeslon, Carmel, Y Fron, Dinas Dinlle, and Cilgwyn. As suggested by the village name, the parish church is dedicated St Twrog. It was the base of the first ever Sea and Mountain Rescue team, and includes the estate of Glynllifon.

RAF Llandwrog was a training airfield during World War II, and was later used as a weapons storage facility. It had a key role in Operation Sandcastle, where a large quantity of Nazi Tabun weapons were stored prior to eventual disposal at sea.
