= Hawker Siddeley Harrier =

British ground attack aircraft

Harrier GR.1, GR.3 AV-8A/C Harrier, AV-8S Matador
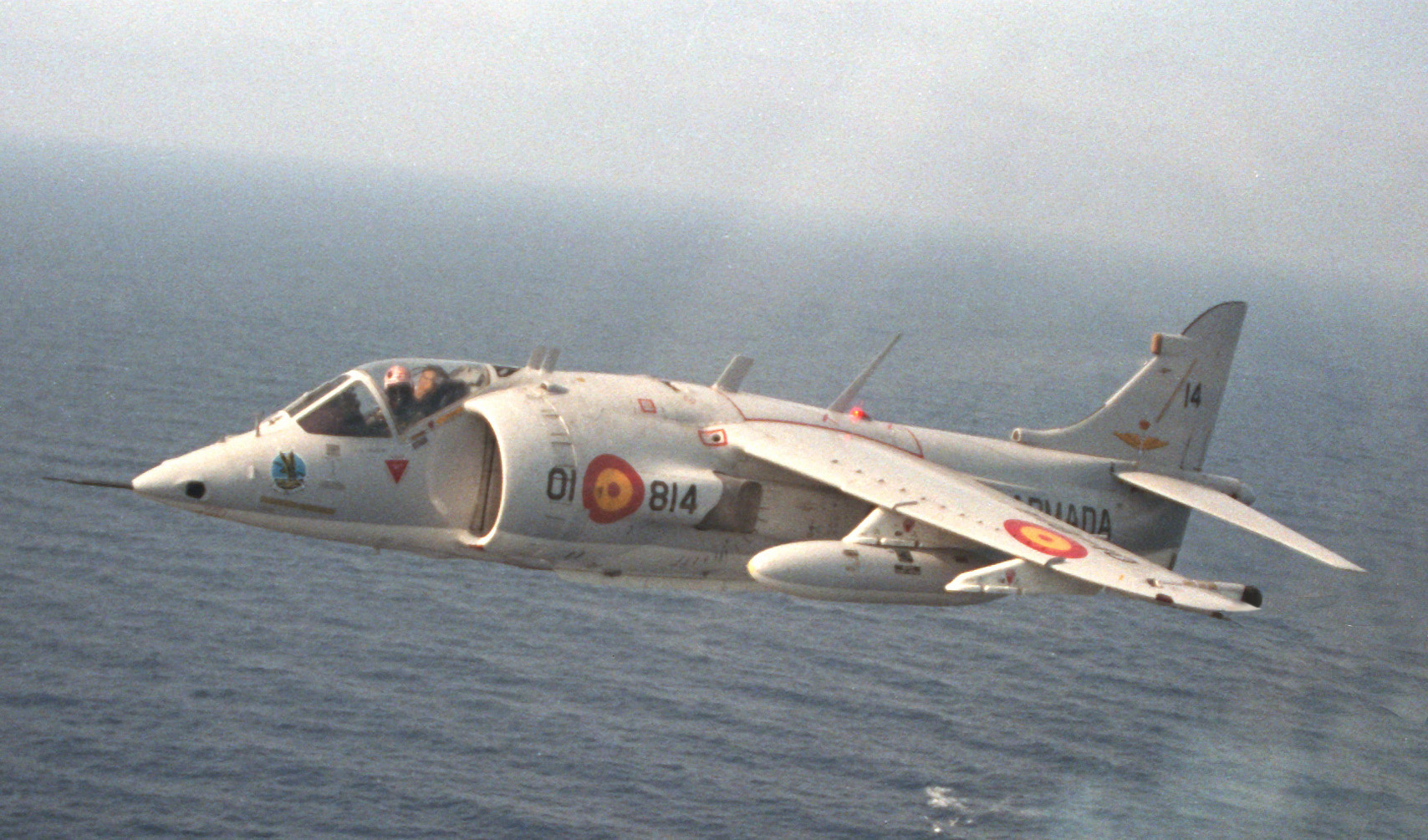
- AV-8S Matador in flight

General information
- Type: V/STOL ground-attack aircraft
- National origin: United Kingdom
- Manufacturer: Hawker Siddeley
- Status: Retired
- Primary users: Royal Air Force (historical) United States Marine Corps (historical); Spanish Navy (historical); Royal Thai Navy (historical)
- Number built: 278

History
- Manufactured: 1967–1986
- Introduction date: 1 April 1969
- First flight: 28 December 1967
- Retired: 2006
- Developed from: Hawker Siddeley P.1127/Kestrel
- Developed into: British Aerospace Sea Harrier; McDonnell Douglas AV-8B Harrier II; British Aerospace Harrier II

The Hawker Siddeley Harrier is a British jet-powered attack aircraft designed and produced by the British aerospace company Hawker Siddeley. It was the first operational ground attack and reconnaissance aircraft with vertical/short takeoff and landing (V/STOL) capabilities and the only truly successful V/STOL design of its era.

It was the first of the Harrier series of aircraft, being developed directly from the Hawker Siddeley Kestrel prototype aircraft following the cancellation of a more advanced supersonic aircraft, the Hawker Siddeley P.1154. In the mid 1960s, the Harrier GR.1 and GR.3 variants were ordered by the British government for the Royal Air Force (RAF). The Harrier GR.1 made its first flight on 28 December 1967, and entered RAF service in April 1969. During the 1970s, the United States opted to procure the aircraft as the AV-8A; it was operated by the US Marine Corps (USMC).

Introduced to service amid the Cold War, the RAF positioned the bulk of their Harriers across West Germany to defend against a potential invasion of Western Europe by the Warsaw Pact forces; the unique abilities of the Harrier allowed the RAF to disperse their forces away from vulnerable airbases. The USMC used their Harriers primarily for close air support, operating from amphibious assault ships, and, if needed, forward operating bases. Harrier squadrons saw several deployments overseas. Its ability to operate with minimal ground facilities and very short runways allowed it to be used at locations unavailable to other fixed-wing aircraft. The Harrier received criticism for having a high accident rate and for a time-consuming maintenance process.

In the 1970s, the British Aerospace Sea Harrier was developed from the Harrier for use by the Royal Navy (RN) on Invincible-class aircraft carriers. Both the Sea Harrier and the Harrier fought in the 1982 Falklands War, in which the aircraft proved to be crucial and versatile. The RN Sea Harriers provided fixed-wing air defence while the RAF Harriers focused on ground-attack missions in support of the advancing British land force. The Harrier was also extensively redesigned as the AV-8B Harrier II and British Aerospace Harrier II by the team of McDonnell Douglas and British Aerospace. During the late 1980s and 1990s, the first-generation aircraft were gradually replaced by the newer Harrier IIs.

== Development ==
=== Origins ===
The Harrier's design was derived from the Hawker P.1127. Prior to developing the P.1127, Hawker Aircraft had been working on a replacement for the Hawker Hunter, the Hawker P.1121. The P.1121 was cancelled after the release of the British Government's 1957 Defence White Paper, which advocated a policy shift away from crewed aircraft and towards missiles. This policy resulted in the termination of the majority of aircraft development projects then underway for the British military. Hawker sought to quickly move on to a new project and became interested in Vertical Take Off/Landing (VTOL) aircraft, which did not need runways. (Note: The development of a V/STOL jet was not Hawker's primary objective as it had put in a joint bid with Avro to meet the GOR.339 Requirement (which resulted in the BAC TSR-2 development programme), but had been unsuccessful. The inability to obtain work on conventional aircraft in a hostile political climate was perhaps the greatest motivation for Hawker to proceed with the development of the Harrier.) According to Air Chief Marshal Sir Patrick Hine this interest may have been stimulated by the presence of Air Staff Requirement 345, which sought a V/STOL ground attack fighter for the Royal Air Force.

Design work on the P.1127 was formally started in 1957 by Sir Sydney Camm, Ralph Hooper of Hawker Aircraft, and Stanley Hooker of the Bristol Engine Company. The close cooperation between Hawker, the airframe company, and Bristol, the engine company, was viewed by project engineer Gordon Lewis as one of the key factors that allowed the development of the Harrier to continue in spite of technical obstacles and political setbacks. Rather than using rotors or a direct jet thrust, the P.1127 had an innovative vectored thrust turbofan engine, the Pegasus. The Pegasus I was rated at 9,000 pounds (40 kN) of thrust and first ran in September 1959. A contract for two development prototypes was signed in June 1960 and the first flight followed in October 1960. Of the six prototypes built, three crashed, including one during an air display at the 1963 Paris Air Show.

=== Tripartite evaluation ===
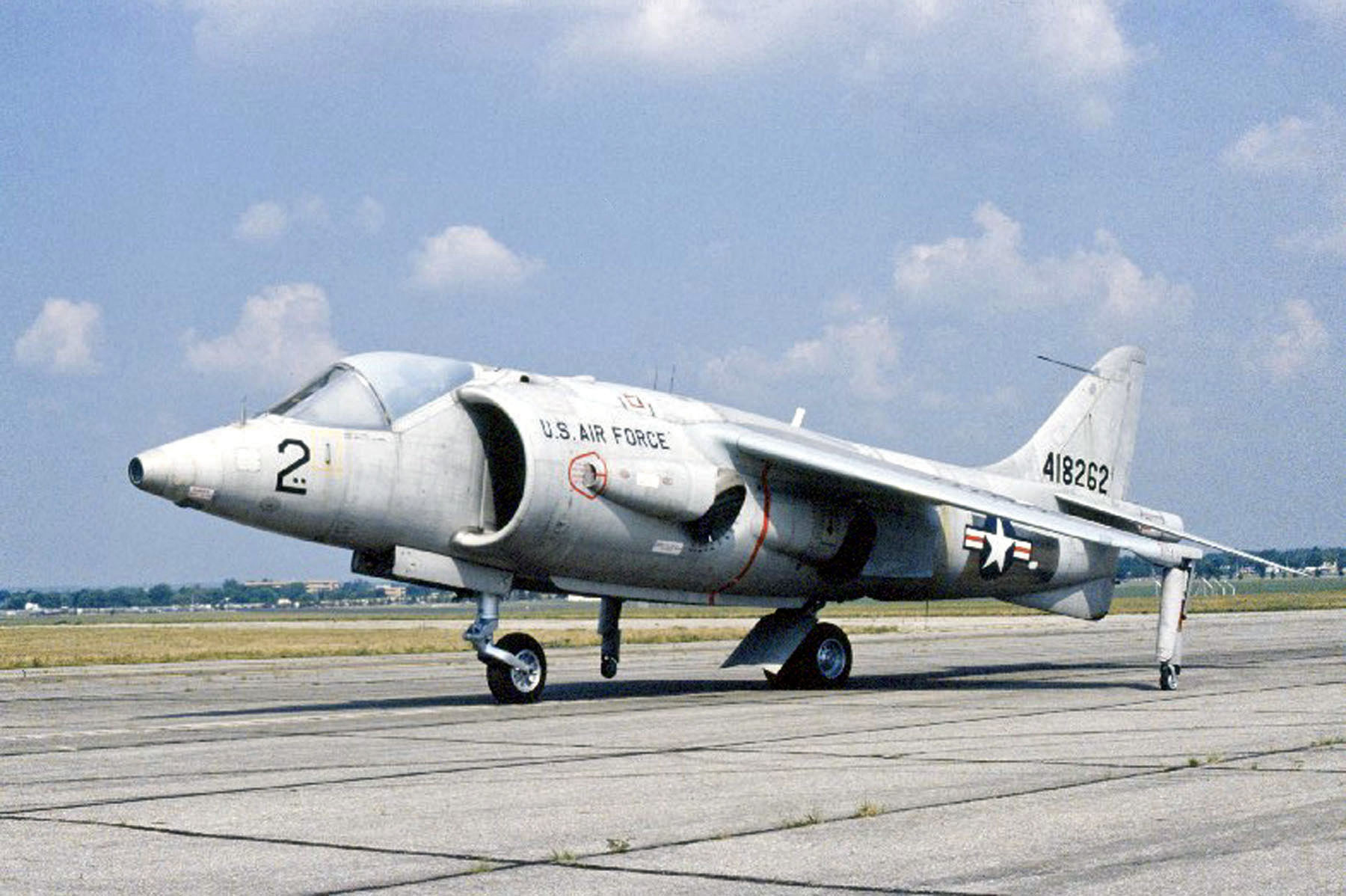
Hawker Siddeley XV-6A Kestrel in later USAF markings

In 1961, the United Kingdom, the United States and West Germany jointly agreed to purchase nine aircraft developed from the P.1127, for the evaluation of the performance and potential of V/STOL aircraft. These aircraft were built by Hawker Siddeley and were designated Kestrel FGA.1 by the UK. The Kestrel was strictly an evaluation aircraft and to save money the Pegasus 5 engine was not fully developed as intended, only having 15,000 pounds (67 kN) of thrust instead of the projected 18,200 pounds (81 kN). The Tripartite Evaluation Squadron numbered ten pilots; four each from the UK and US and two from West Germany. The Kestrel's first flight took place on 7 March 1964.

A total of 960 sorties had been made during the trials, including 1,366 takeoffs and landings, by the end of evaluations in November 1965. One aircraft was destroyed in an accident and six others were transferred to the United States, assigned the US designation XV-6A Kestrel, and underwent further testing. The two remaining British-based Kestrels were assigned to further trials and experimentation at RAE Bedford with one being modified to use the uprated Pegasus 6 engine.

=== P.1154 ===
At the time of the development of the P.1127 Hawker and Bristol had also undertaken considerable development work on a supersonic version, the Hawker Siddeley P.1154, to meet a North Atlantic Treaty Organization (NATO) requirement issued for such an aircraft. The design used a single Bristol Siddeley BS100 engine with four swivelling nozzles, in a fashion similar to the P.1127, and required the use of plenum chamber burning (PCB) to achieve supersonic speeds. The P.1154 won the competition to meet the requirement against strong competition from other aircraft manufacturers such as Dassault Aviation's Mirage IIIV. The French government did not accept the decision and withdrew; the NATO requirement was cancelled shortly after in 1965. (Note: The Mirage IIIV had been rejected mainly because of its excessive complexity, using nine engines compared with the P.1154's single-engine approach.)

The Royal Air Force and the Royal Navy planned to develop and introduce the supersonic P.1154 independently of the cancelled NATO requirement. This ambition was complicated by the conflicting requirements between the two services—while the RAF wanted a low-level supersonic strike aircraft, the Navy sought a twin-engine air defence fighter. Following the election of the Labour Government of 1964 the P.1154 was cancelled, as the Royal Navy had already begun procurement of the McDonnell Douglas Phantom II and the RAF placed a greater importance on the BAC TSR-2's ongoing development. Work continued on elements of the project, such as a supersonic PCB-equipped Pegasus engine, with the intention of developing a future Harrier variant for the decades following cancellation. (Note: The supersonic Harrier is not to be confused with the Big Wing Harrier. Neither concept would result in a successor aircraft.)

=== Production ===
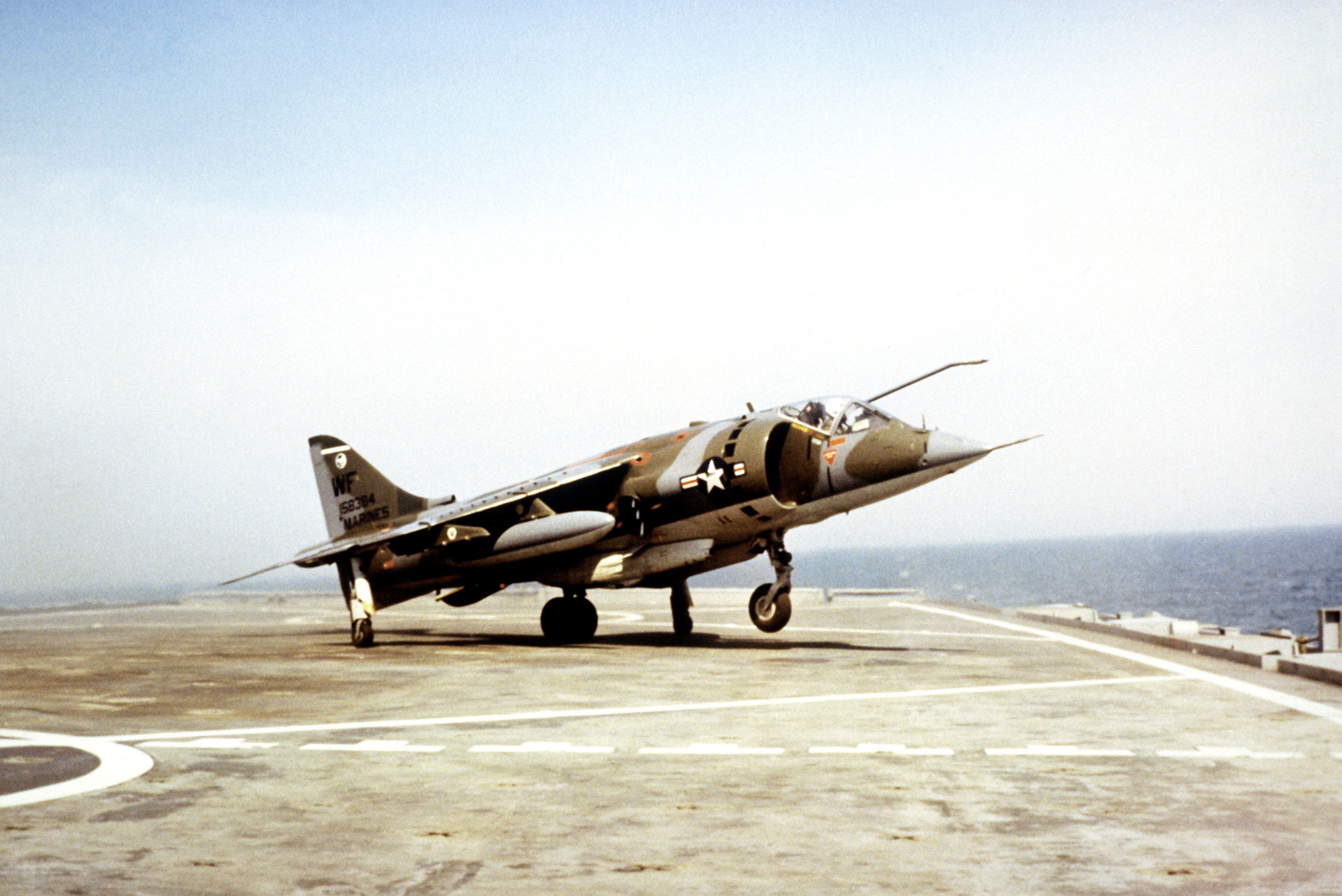
AV-8C Harrier taking off from an amphibious transport dock ship

Following the collapse of the P.1154's development the RAF began considering a simple upgrade of the existing subsonic Kestrel and issued Requirement ASR 384 for a V/STOL ground attack jet. Hawker Siddeley received an order for six pre-production aircraft in 1965, designated P.1127 (RAF), of which the first made its maiden flight on 31 August 1966. An order for 60 production aircraft, designated as Harrier GR.1, was received in early 1967. The aircraft was named after the Harrier, a bird of prey.

The Harrier GR.1 made its first flight on 28 December 1967, and it officially entered service with the RAF on 1 April 1969. The aircraft was built in two factories—one in Kingston upon Thames, southwest London, and the other at Dunsfold Aerodrome, Surrey—and underwent initial testing at Dunsfold. The ski-jump technique for launching Harriers from Royal Navy aircraft carriers was extensively trialled at RNAS Yeovilton from 1977. Following these tests ski-jumps were added to the flight decks of all RN carriers from 1979 onwards, in preparation for the new variant for the navy, the Sea Harrier.

In the late 1960s the British and American governments held talks on producing Harriers in the United States. Hawker Siddeley and McDonnell Douglas formed a partnership in 1969 in preparation for American production, but Congressman Mendel Rivers and the House Appropriations Committee held that it would be cheaper to produce the AV-8A on the pre-existing production lines in the United Kingdom—hence all AV-8A Harriers were purchased from Hawker Siddeley. Improved Harrier versions with better sensors and more powerful engines were developed in later years. The USMC received 102 AV-8A and 8 TAV-8A Harriers between 1971 and 1976.

== Design ==
=== Overview ===
The Harrier was typically used as a ground attack aircraft, though its manoeuvrability also allows it to effectively engage other aircraft at short ranges. The Harrier is powered by a single Pegasus turbofan engine mounted in the fuselage. The engine is fitted with two air intakes and four vectoring nozzles for directing the thrust generated: two for the bypass flow and two for the jet exhaust. Several small reaction nozzles are also fitted, in the nose, tail and wingtips, for the purpose of balancing during vertical flight. It has two landing gear units on the fuselage and two outrigger landing gear units, one near each wing tip. The Harrier is equipped with four wing and three fuselage pylons for carrying a variety of weapons and external fuel tanks.

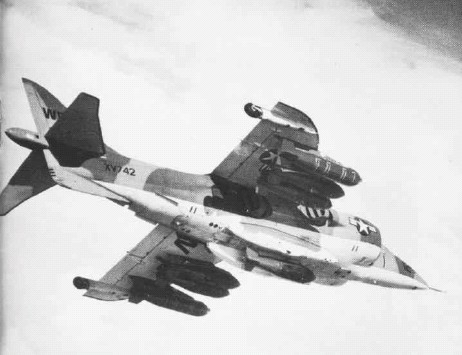
An RAF Harrier GR.1, on loan to the USMC, displaying its underside with a full load of bombs

The Kestrel and the Harrier were similar in appearance, though approximately 90 per cent of the Kestrel's airframe was redesigned for the Harrier. The Harrier was powered by the more powerful Pegasus 6 engine; new air intakes with auxiliary blow-in doors were added to produce the required airflow at low speed. Its wing was modified to increase area and the landing gear was strengthened. Several hardpoints were installed, two under each wing and one underneath the fuselage; two 30 mm (1.2 in) ADEN cannon gun pods could also be fitted to the underside of the fuselage. The Harrier was outfitted with updated avionics to replace the basic systems used in the Kestrel; (Note: Some avionics systems used in the Harrier had been carried over from the cancelled BAC TSR-2, such as the Weapon Aiming Computer.) a navigational-attack system incorporating an inertial navigation system, originally for the P.1154, was installed and information was presented to the pilot by a head-up display and a moving map display.

The Harrier's VTOL abilities allowed it to be deployed from very small prepared clearings or helipads as well as normal airfields. (Note: The area needed for a Harrier to comfortably take off was said to be less than a tennis court, while the majority of aircraft required a two-mile-long runway.) It was believed that, in a high-intensity conflict, air bases would be vulnerable and likely to be quickly knocked out. (Note: Experience from the Second World War had made this vulnerability abundantly clear to many Air Force officers around the world; this perception of vulnerability contributed heavily to the interest in and development of VTOL aircraft like the Harrier.) The capability to scatter Harrier squadrons to dozens of small "alert pads" on the front lines was highly prized by military strategists and the USMC procured the aircraft because of this ability. (Note: Some officers went so far as to deride conventional aircraft, unfavourably comparing to the Maginot Line, as static and highly vulnerable.) Hawker Siddeley noted that STOL operation provided additional benefits over VTOL operation, saving fuel and allowing the aircraft to carry more ordnance.

I still don't believe the Harrier. Think of the millions that have been spent on VTO in America and Russia, and quite a bit in Europe, and yet the only vertical take-off aircraft which you can call a success is the Harrier. When I saw the Harrier hovering and flying backwards under control, I reckoned I'd seen everything. And it's not difficult to fly.

— Thomas Sopwith

The Harrier, while serving for many decades in various forms, has been criticised on multiple issues; in particular a high accident rate, though Nordeen notes that several conventional single-engine strike aircraft like the Douglas A-4 Skyhawk and LTV A-7 Corsair II had worse accident rates. The Los Angeles Times reported in 2003 that the Harrier "...has amassed the highest major accident rate of any military plane now in service. Forty-five Marines have died in 148 noncombat accidents". Colonel Lee Buland of the USMC declared the maintenance of a Harrier to be a "challenge"; the need to remove the wings before performing most work upon the engine, including engine replacements, meant the Harrier required considerable man-hours in maintenance, more than most aircraft. Buland noted however that the maintenance difficulties were unavoidable in order to create a V/STOL aircraft.

=== Engine ===
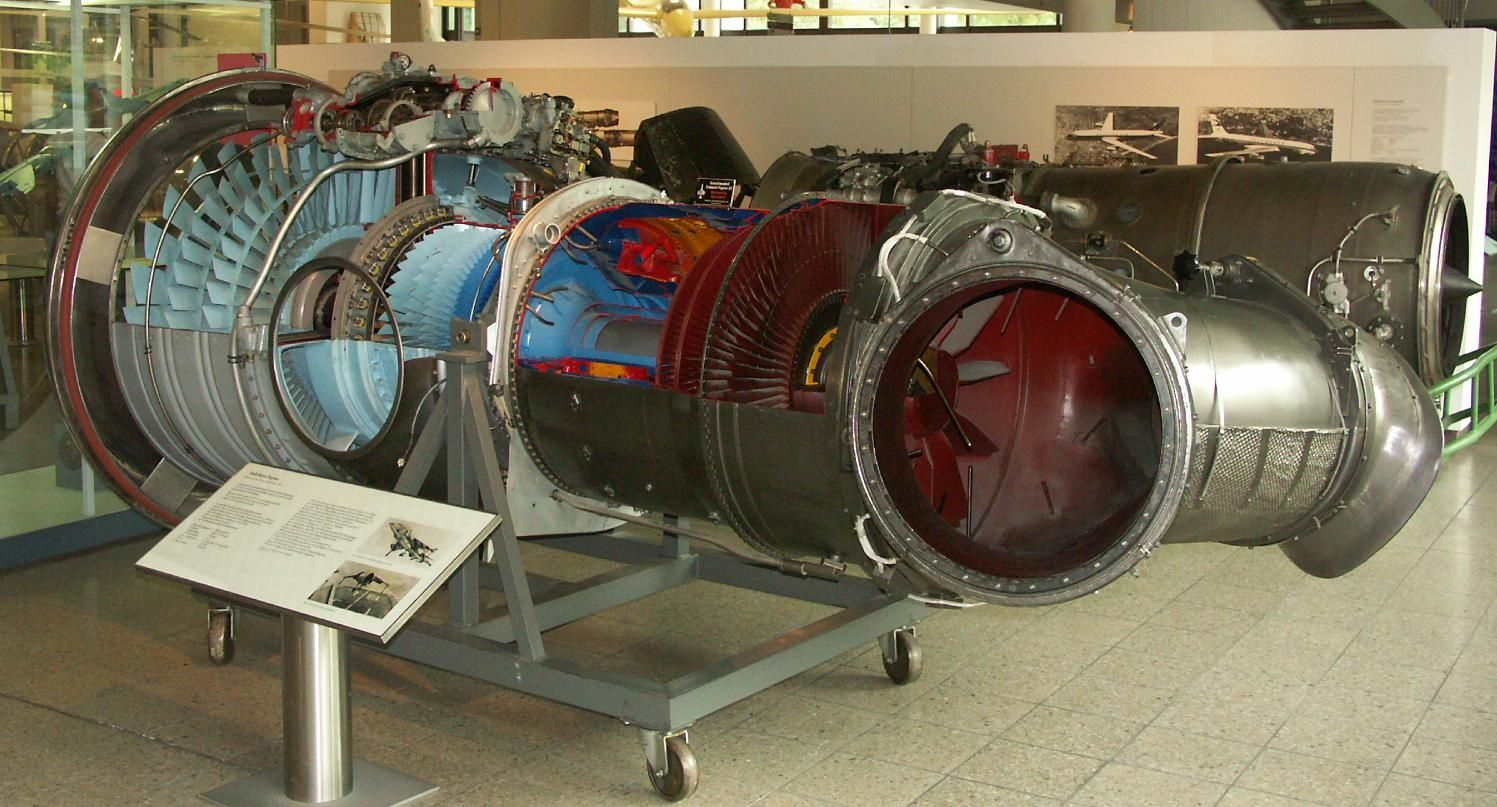
Rolls-Royce Pegasus engine on display, sections have been cut out to provide an internal view

The Pegasus turbofan jet engine, developed in tandem with the P.1127 then the Harrier, was designed specifically for V/STOL manoeuvring. Bristol Siddeley developed it from their earlier conventional Orpheus turbofan engine as the core with Olympus compressor blades for the fan. The engine's thrust is directed through the four rotatable nozzles. The engine is equipped for water injection to increase thrust and takeoff performance in hot and high altitude conditions; in normal V/STOL operations the system would be used in landing vertically with a heavy weapons load. The water injection function had originally been added following the input of US Air Force Colonel Bill Chapman, who worked for the Mutual Weapons Development Team. Water injection was necessary in order to generate maximum thrust, if only for a limited time, and was typically used during landing, especially in high ambient temperatures.

The aircraft was initially powered by the Pegasus 6 engine which was replaced by the more powerful Pegasus 11 during the Harrier GR.1 to GR.3 upgrade process. The primary focus throughout the engine's development was on achieving high performance with as little weight as possible, tempered by the amount of funding that was available. Following the Harrier's entry to service the focus switched to improving reliability and extending engine life; a formal joint US–UK Pegasus Support Program operated for many years and spent a £3-million annual budget to develop engine improvements. Several variants have been released; the latest is the Pegasus 11–61 (Mk 107), which provides 23,800 pounds (106 kN) of thrust, more than any previous engine.

=== Controls and handling ===
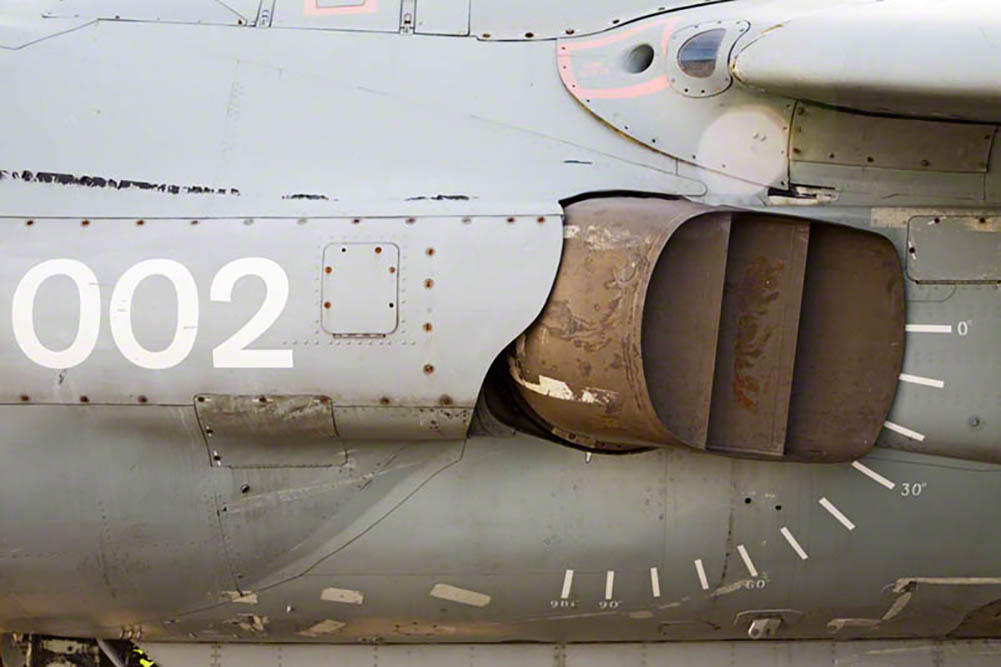
Thrust vectoring nozzle on a Sea Harrier

Locations of the four nozzles on the sides of the engine

The aircraft is capable of both forward flight where it behaves in the manner of a typical fixed-wing aircraft above its stall speed, as well as VTOL and STOL manoeuvres where the traditional lift and control surfaces are useless, requiring skills and technical knowledge usually associated with helicopters. Most services demand great aptitude and extensive training for Harrier pilots, as well as experience in piloting both types of aircraft. Trainee pilots are often drawn from highly experienced and skilled helicopter pilots. (Note: In preparation for flying the Kestrel, pilots of the Tripartite Evaluation Squadron were provided with several hours of helicopter piloting tuition, all of whom agreed on the effort being highly worthwhile preparation.)

The Harrier has two control elements not found in conventional fixed-wing aircraft: the thrust vector and the reaction control system. The thrust vector refers to the slant of the four engine nozzles and can be set between 0° (horizontal, pointing directly backwards), for level flight, and 98° (pointing down and slightly forwards). The 90° vector is normally deployed for VTOL manoeuvring. The reaction control is similar to the cyclic control of a helicopter, and is achieved by manipulating a control stick forward for horizontal flight, or back for short or vertical takeoffs and landings. Senior RAF officers considered the ability to control the aircraft's vertical flight with just one lever a considerable design success.

The wind direction is a critical factor in VTOL manoeuvres, and aircraft face the wind for take-off. For vertical takeoff, the thrust vector is set to 90° and the throttle is brought up to maximum, at which point the aircraft leaves the ground. The throttle is trimmed until a hover state is achieved at the desired altitude. The short-takeoff procedure involves proceeding with normal takeoff and then applying a thrust vector (less than 90°) at a runway speed below normal takeoff speed, usually around 65 knots (120 km/h). For lower takeoff speeds the thrust vector is greater. The reaction control system involves the thrusters at key points in the aircraft's fuselage, nose and wingtips. Thrust from the engine can be temporarily syphoned to control and correct the aircraft's pitch and roll during vertical flight.

Rotating the vectored thrust nozzles into a forward-facing position during normal flight is called vectoring in forward flight, or "VIFFing". This is a dog-fighting tactic, allowing for more sudden braking and higher turn rates. Braking could cause a chasing aircraft to overshoot and present itself as a target for the Harrier it was chasing, a combat technique formally developed by the USMC for the Harrier in the early 1970s.

Because of the added learning curve and complex capabilities, the Harrier has been described by pilots as "unforgiving", with three of the first six prototypes crashing.

=== Differences between versions ===
The two largest users of the Harrier were the Royal Air Force and the United States Marine Corps (USMC). The exported model of the aircraft operated by the USMC was designated the AV-8A Harrier, which was broadly similar to the RAF's Harrier GR.1. Changes included the removal of all magnesium components, which corroded quickly at sea, and the integration of American radios and identification friend or foe (IFF) systems; furthermore the outer pylons, unlike the RAF aircraft, were designed from delivery to be equipped with self-defence AIM-9 Sidewinder heat-seeking air-to-air missiles. Most of the AV-8As had been delivered with the more powerful Pegasus engine used in the GR.3 instead of the one used in the earlier GR.1. Two-seat Harriers were operated for training purposes; the body was stretched and a taller tail fin added. The RAF trained in the T.2 and T.4 versions, while T.4N and T.8 were training versions the Navy's Sea Harrier, with appropriate fittings. The US and Spain flew the TAV-8A and TAV-8S, respectively.

All RAF GR.1s and the initial AV-8As were fitted with the Ferranti FE541 inertial navigation/attack suite, but these were replaced in the USMC Harriers by a simpler Interface/Weapon Aiming Computer to aid quick turnaround between missions. The Martin-Baker ejection seats were also replaced by the Stencel SEU-3A in the American aircraft. The RAF had their GR.1 aircraft upgraded to the GR.3 standard, which featured improved sensors, a nose-mounted laser tracker, the integration of electronic countermeasure (ECM) systems and a further upgraded Pegasus Mk 103. The USMC upgraded their AV-8As to the AV-8C configuration; this programme involved the installation of ECM equipment and adding a new inertial navigation system to the aircraft's avionics. Substantial changes were the Lift Improvement Devices, to increase VTOL performance; at the same time several airframe components were restored or replaced to extend the life of the aircraft. Spain's Harriers, designated AV-8S or VA.1 Matador for the single-seater and TAV-8S or VAE.1 for the two-seater, were almost identical to USMC Harriers differing only in the radios fitted.

The Royal Navy's Fleet Air Arm (FAA) operated a substantially modified variant of the Harrier, the British Aerospace Sea Harrier. The Sea Harrier was intended for multiple naval roles and was equipped with radar and Sidewinder missiles for air combat duties as part of fleet air defence. (Note: While the USMC Harriers had Sidewinder missiles, they still lacked radars.) The Sea Harrier was also fitted with navigational aids for carrier landings, modifications to reduce corrosion by seawater and a raised bubble-canopy covered cockpit for better visibility. The aircraft were later equipped to use AIM-120 AMRAAM beyond-visual-range anti-aircraft missiles and the more advanced Blue Vixen radar for longer range air-to-air combat, as well as Sea Eagle missiles for conducting anti-ship missions.

The second-generation McDonnell Douglas AV-8B Harrier II and the related BAE Harrier II were developed to replace the first-generation Harrier, which they supplanted in RAF, USMC and FAA service. In the 1970s the United Kingdom considered two options for replacing their existing Harriers: joining McDonnell Douglas (MDC) in developing the Harrier II, or the independent development of a "Big Wing" Harrier. This proposal would have increased the wing area from 200 to 250 square feet (19 to 23 m^{2}), allowing for significant increases in weapons load and internal fuel reserves. The option of cooperation with MDC was chosen in 1982 over the more risky isolated approach.

== Operational history ==
=== Royal Air Force ===
The first RAF squadron to be equipped with the Harrier GR.1, No. 1 Squadron, started to convert to the aircraft at RAF Wittering in April 1969. An early demonstration of the Harrier's capabilities was the participation of two aircraft in the Daily Mail Transatlantic Air Race in May 1969, flying between St Pancras railway station, London and central Manhattan with the use of aerial refuelling. The overall journey between the Post Office Tower and Empire State Building took 6 hours 11 minutes; the Harrier had a flight time of 5 hours 57 minutes. Two Harrier squadrons were established in 1970 at the RAF's air base in Wildenrath to be part of its air force in Germany; another squadron was formed there two years later. In 1977, these three squadrons were moved forward to the air base at Gütersloh, closer to the prospective front line in the event of an outbreak of a European war. One of the squadrons was disbanded and its aircraft distributed between the other two.

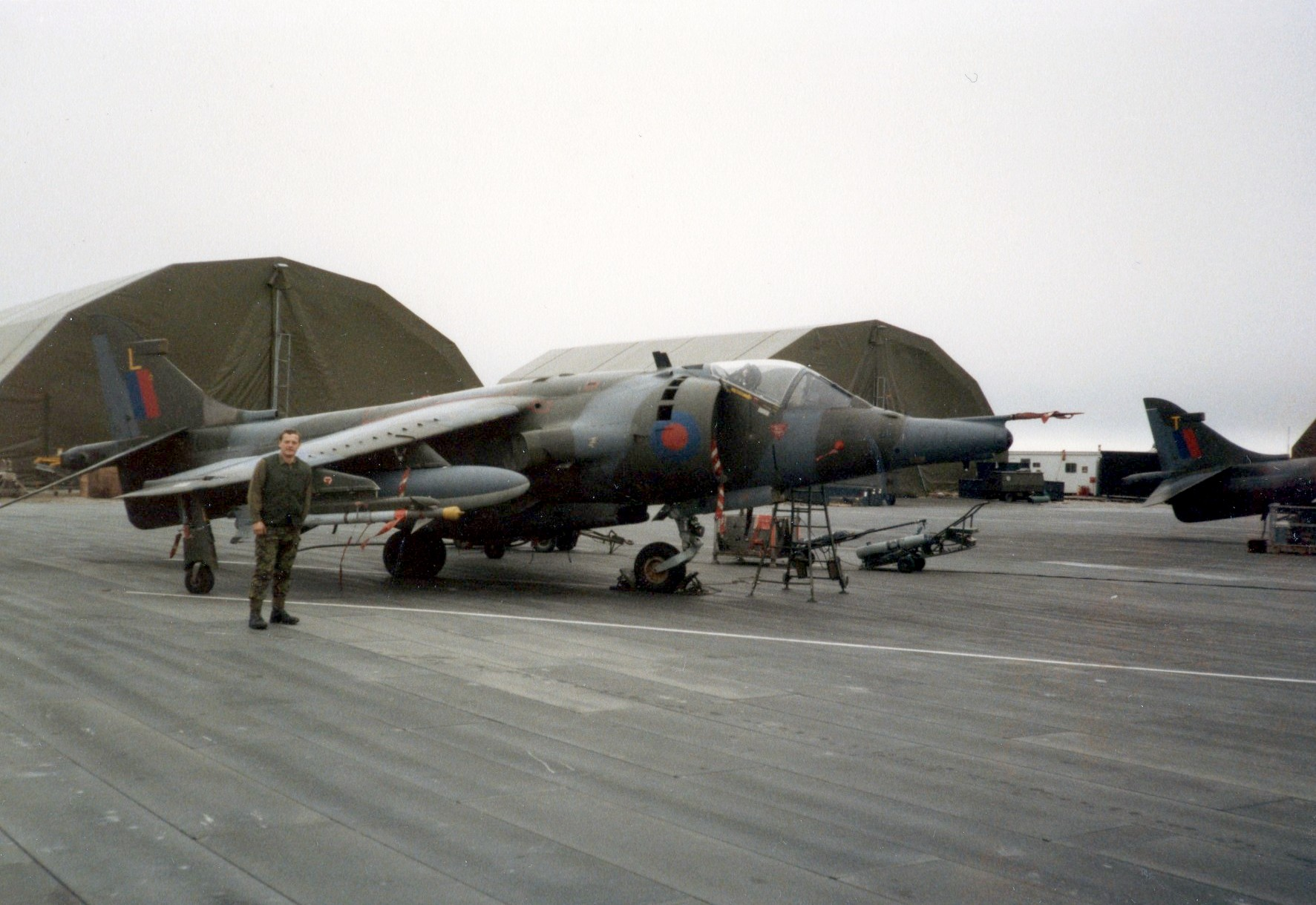
A No. 1453 Flight Harrier GR.3 at Stanley Airport in 1984

In RAF service, the Harrier was used in close air support (CAS), reconnaissance, and other ground-attack roles. The flexibility of the Harrier led to a long-term heavy deployment in West Germany as a conventional deterrent and potential strike weapon against Soviet aggression; from camouflaged rough bases the Harrier was expected to launch attacks on advancing armour columns from East Germany. Harriers were also deployed to bases in Norway and Belize, a former British colony. No. 1 Squadron was specifically earmarked for Norwegian operations in the event of war, operating as part of Allied Forces Northern Europe. The Harrier's capabilities were necessary in the Belize deployment, as it was the only RAF combat aircraft capable of safely operating from the airport's short runway; British forces had been stationed in Belize for several years due to tensions over a Guatemalan claim to Belizean territory; the forces were withdrawn in 1993, two years after Guatemala recognized the independence of Belize.

==== Falklands War ====
In the Falklands War (Spanish: Guerra de las Malvinas) in 1982, 10 Harrier GR.3s of No. 1 Squadron operated from the aircraft carrier HMS Hermes. As the RAF Harrier GR.3 had not been designed for naval service, the 10 aircraft had to be rapidly modified prior to the departure of the task force. Special sealants against corrosion were applied and a new deck-based inertial guidance aid was devised to allow the RAF Harrier to land on a carrier as easily as the Sea Harrier. Transponders to guide aircraft back to the carriers during night-time operations were also installed, along with flares and chaff dispensers.

Due to limited space aboard the aircraft carriers, two requisitioned merchant container ships, Atlantic Conveyor and Atlantic Causeway, were modified with temporary flight decks to transport Harrier aircraft and helicopters to the South Atlantic.

Harrier GR.3s were primarily employed in providing close air support for ground forces on the Falklands, with a particular emphasis on suppressing Argentine artillery. Sea Harriers were primarily tasked with conducting combat air patrols in response to the threat posed by Argentine aircraft. Both Sea Harriers and Harrier GR.3s were employed in ground-attack operations against the airfield and runway at Stanley.

Had additional Sea Harriers been lost, Harrier GR.3s would have been reassigned to air patrol duties, despite not being designed for air defence operations. Consequently, their outboard weapons pylons were rapidly modified to carry air-to-air Sidewinder missiles. Between 10 and 24 May 1982, prior to the British landings in the Falklands, a detachment of three GR.3s was deployed to provide air defence for Ascension Island until the arrival of three F-4 Phantom IIs, which subsequently assumed the role.

During the conflict, the principal threats to Harrier aircraft were assessed as surface-to-air missiles (SAMs), anti-aircraft artillery, and small arms fire, with four Harrier GR.3s and six Sea Harriers lost.

More than 2,000 Harrier sorties were flown during the conflict, an average of six sorties per aircraft per day.

==== Skyhook and post Falklands deployment ====
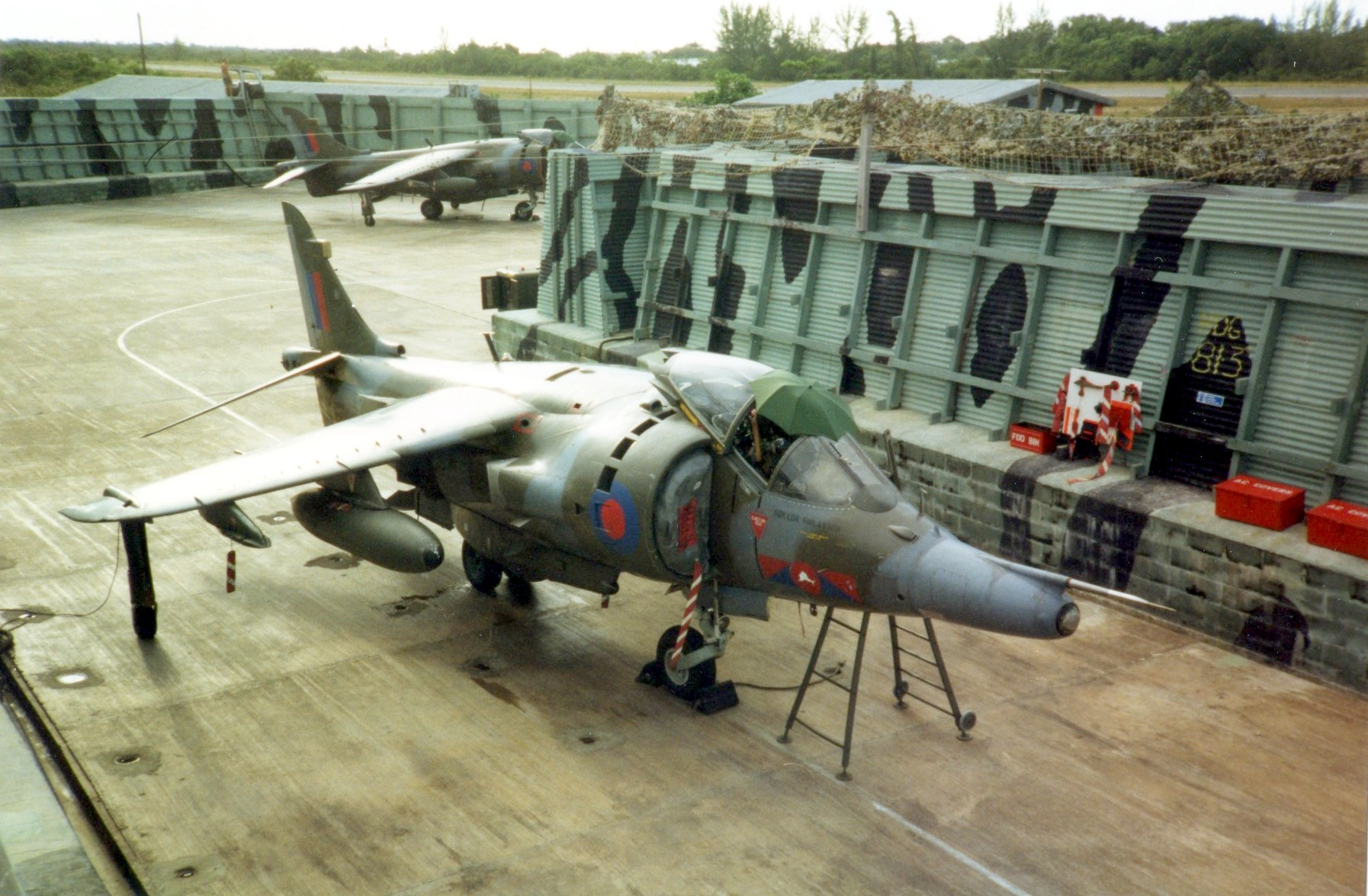
An RAF Harrier GR.3 in Belize, 1990

Following the Falklands War, British Aerospace explored the Skyhook, a new technique to operate Harriers from smaller ships. Skyhook would have allowed the launching and landing of Harriers from smaller ships by holding the aircraft in midair by a crane; secondary cranes were to hold weapons for rapid re-arming. This would potentially have saved fuel and allowed for operations in rougher seas. The system was marketed to foreign customers, (Note: In the early 1990s, following Japanese interest in acquiring Harriers, Skyhook was suggested as a means to operate onboard their helicopter destroyers.) and it was speculated that Skyhook could be applied to large submarines such as the Russian Typhoon class, but the system attracted no interest.

The first generation of Harriers did not see further combat with the RAF after the Falklands War, although they continued to serve for years afterwards. As a deterrent against further Argentine invasion attempts, No. 1453 Flight RAF was deployed to the Falkland Islands from August 1983 to June 1985. However the second generation Harrier IIs saw action in Bosnia, Iraq, and Afghanistan. The first generation Hawker Siddeley airframes were replaced by the improved Harrier II, which had been developed jointly between McDonnell Douglas and British Aerospace.

=== United States Marine Corps ===
"In my mind the AV-8A Harrier was like the helicopter in Korea. [It] had limited capability, but that's how the first-generation automobile, boat, or other major systems evolved... it brought us into the world of flexible basing and the Marine Corps into the concept of vertical development"

— Major General Joe Anderson.

The United States Marine Corps began showing a significant interest in the aircraft around the time the first RAF Harrier squadron was established in 1969, and this motivated Hawker Siddeley to further develop the aircraft to encourage a purchase. Although there were concerns in Congress about multiple coinciding projects in the close air support role, (Note: These other projects were the Lockheed AH-56 Cheyenne and the Fairchild Republic A-10 Thunderbolt II.) the Marine Corps were enthusiastic about the Harrier and managed to overcome efforts to obstruct its procurement.

The Marine Corps accepted its first AV-8A on 6 January 1971, at Dunsfold Aerodrome, England and began testing it at Naval Air Station Patuxent River on 26 January. The AV-8A entered service with the Marine Corps in 1971, replacing other aircraft in the Marines' attack squadrons. The service became interested in performing ship-borne operations with the Harrier. Admiral Elmo Zumwalt promoted the concept of a Sea Control Ship, a 15,000-ton light carrier equipped with Harriers and helicopters, to supplement the larger aircraft carriers of the US Navy. An amphibious assault ship, USS Guam, was converted into the Interim Sea Control Ship and operated as such between 1971 and 1973 with the purpose of studying the limits and possible obstacles for operating such a vessel. Since then the Sea Control Ship concept has been subject to periodic re-examinations and studies, often in the light of budget cuts and questions over the use of supercarriers. (Note: Spain would adapt the American Sea Control Ship concept with the addition of a ski jump, launching the vessel as the Principe de Asturias, which carried AV-8S Matador Harriers.)

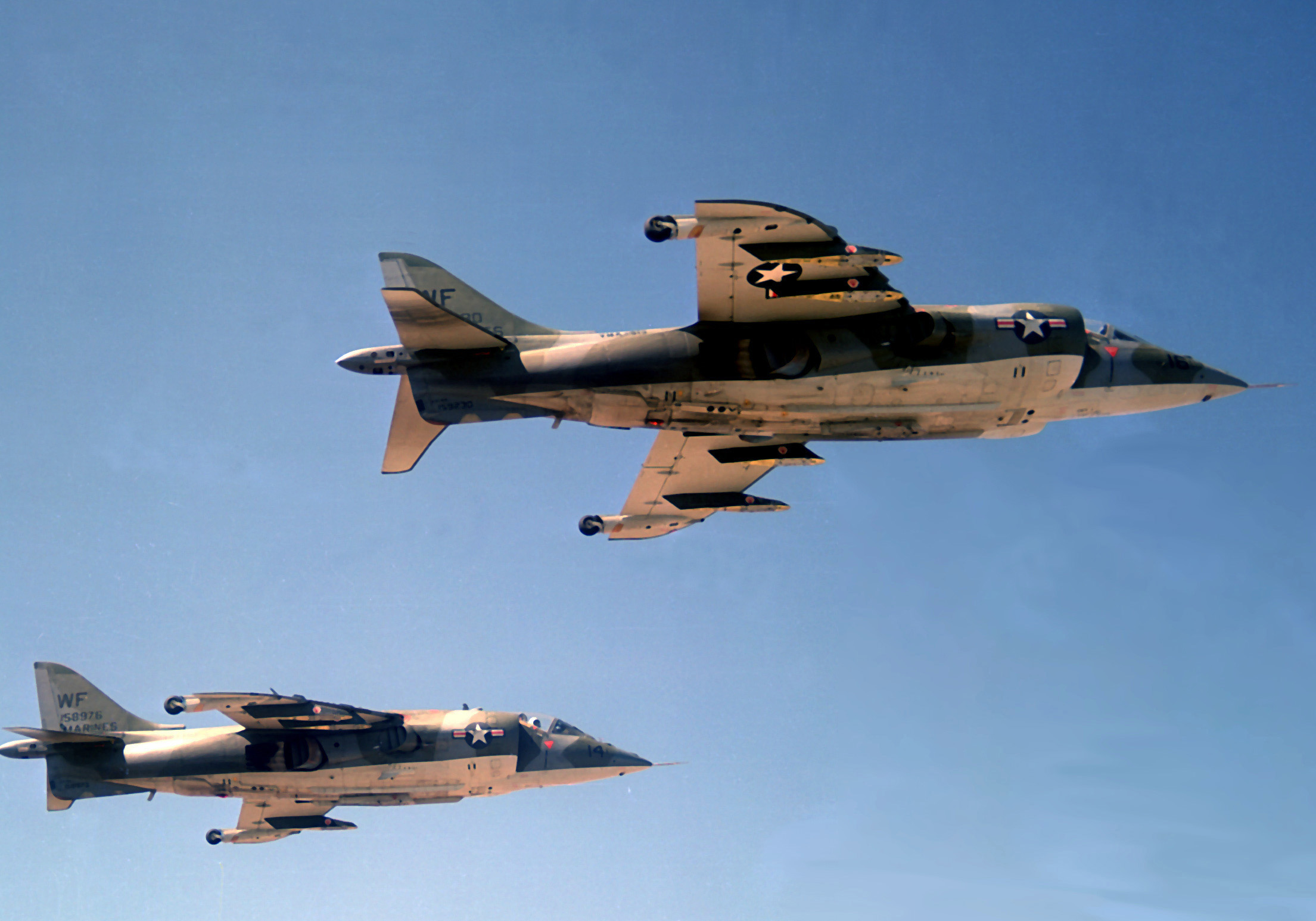
A pair of USMC AV-8A from VMA-513 in formation flight in 1974

Other exercises were performed to demonstrate the AV-8A's suitability for operating from various amphibious assault ships and aircraft carriers, including a deployment of 14 Harriers aboard USS Franklin D. Roosevelt for six months in 1976. The tests showed, amongst other things, that the Harrier was capable of performing in weather where conventional carrier aircraft could not. In support of naval operations, the USMC devised and studied several methods to further integrate the Harrier. One result was Arapaho, a stand-by system to rapidly convert civilian cargo ships into seagoing platforms for operating and maintaining a handful of Harriers, to be used to augment the number of available ships to deploy upon. (Note: Arapaho would have been operationally similar to the British container ship Atlantic Conveyor, which not only transported Harriers but was modified to enable crude flight operations as well.)

When the reactivation of the Iowa-class battleships was under consideration, a radical design for a battleship-carrier hybrid emerged that would have replaced the ship's rear turret with a flight deck, complete with a hangar and two ski jumps, for operating several Harriers. However, the USMC considered the need for naval gunfire support to be a greater priority than additional platforms for carrier operations, while the cost and delay associated with such elaborate conversions was significant, and the concept was dropped.

The Marines Corps' concept for deploying the Harriers in a land-based expeditionary role focused on aggressive speed. Harrier forward bases and light maintenance facilities were to be set up in under 24 hours on any prospective battle area. The forward bases, containing one to four aircraft, were to be located 20 miles (32 km) from the forward edge of battle (FEBA), while a more established permanent airbase would be located around 50 miles (80 km) from the FEBA. (Note: Dispersed forward bases were heavily reliant on effective transportation to refuel and rearm the Harriers; possessing a large fleet of air transports, helicopters or ground vehicles to support such operations was identified as crucial by USMC senior officers. It was planned that supplies would to be regularly ferried by Sikorsky CH-53E Super Stallions from main bases to all forward bases.) The close proximity of forward bases allowed for a far greater sortie rate and reduced fuel consumption.

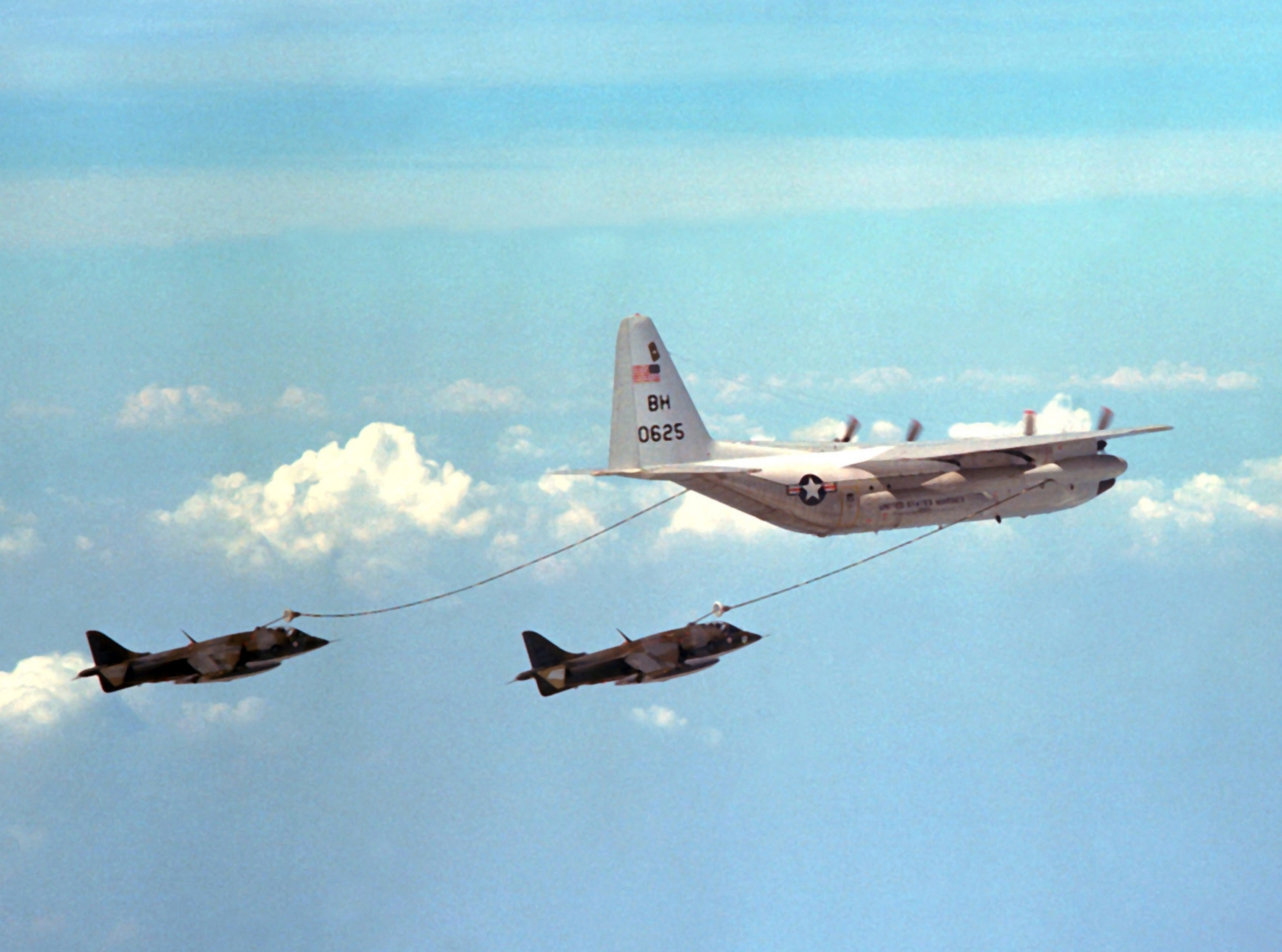
A pair of USMC AV-8A Harriers refuelling from a Lockheed Martin KC-130 tanker

The AV-8A's abilities in air-to-air combat were tested by the Marine Corps by conducting mock dogfights with McDonnell Douglas F-4 Phantom IIs; these exercises trained pilots to use the vectoring-in-forward-flight (VIFF) capability to outmanoeuvre their opponents and showed that the Harriers could act as effective air-to-air fighters at close range. The success of Harrier operations countered scepticism of V/STOL aircraft, which had been judged to be expensive failures in the past. Marine Corps officers became convinced of the military advantages of the Harrier and pursued extensive development of the aircraft.

Starting in 1979, the USMC began upgrading their AV-8As to the AV-8C configuration—the work focused mainly on extending useful service lives and improving VTOL performance. The AV-8C and the remaining AV-8A Harriers were retired by 1987. These were replaced by the Harrier II, designated as the AV-8B, which was introduced into service in 1985. The performance of the Harrier in USMC service led to calls for the United States Air Force to procure Harrier IIs in addition to the USMC's own plans, but these never resulted in Air Force orders. Since the late 1990s, the AV-8B has been slated to be replaced by the F-35B variant of the Lockheed Martin F-35 Lightning II, a more modern V/STOL jet aircraft.

Like the next generation AV-8Bs, nevertheless, the AV-8A/C Harriers suffered many accidents, with around 40 aircraft lost and some 30 pilots killed during the 1970s and 1980s.

=== Other operators ===
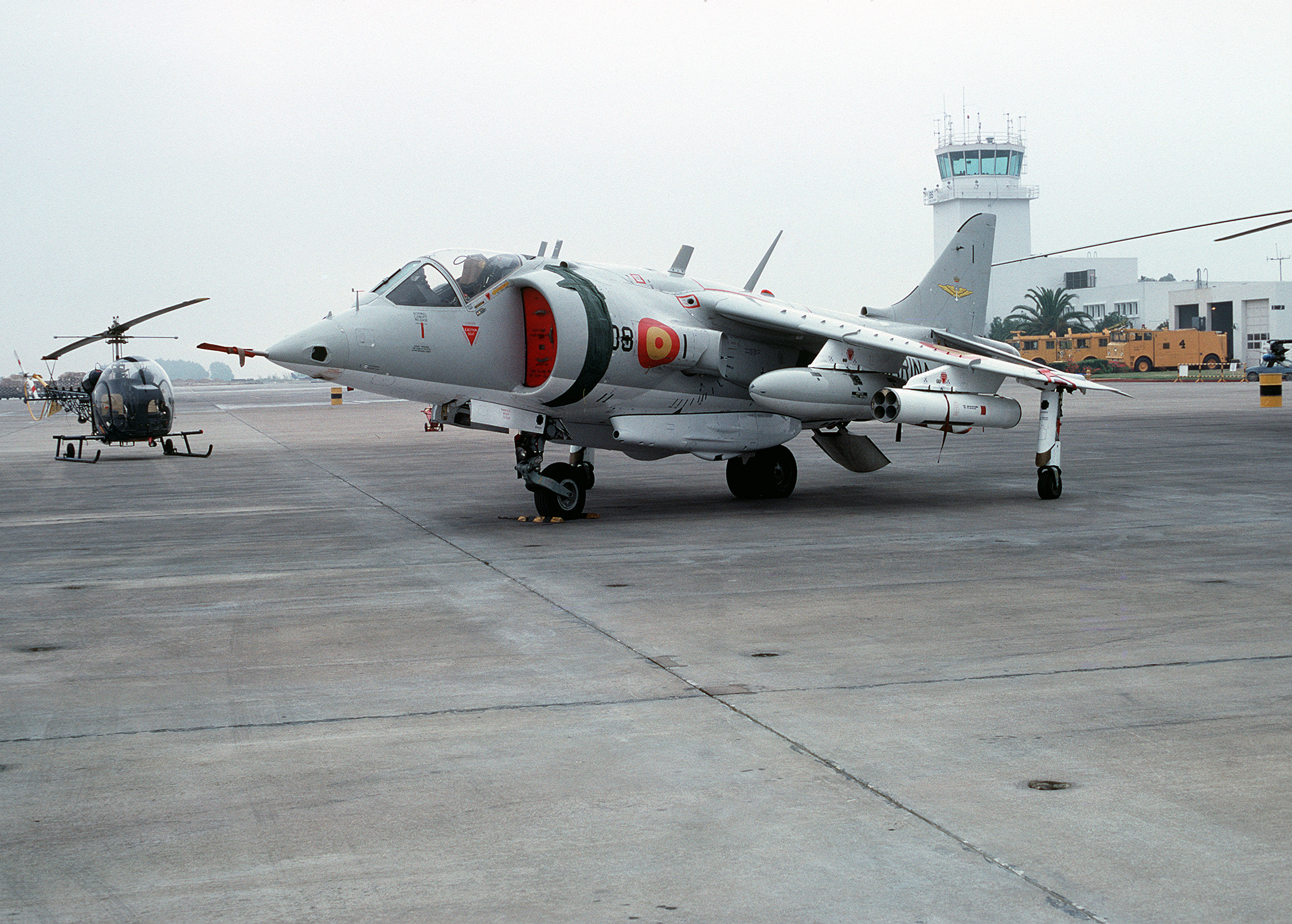
A Spanish Navy AV-8S Matador aircraft

Due to the Harrier's unique characteristics it attracted a large amount of interest from other nations, often as attempts to make their own V/STOL jets were unsuccessful, such as in the cases of the American Lockheed XV-4 Hummingbird and the German VFW VAK 191B. (Note: Kevin Brown of Popular Mechanics described the development efforts of performance vertical aircraft as having "long eluded the best efforts of the aviation industry", and noted that several American efforts had been "spectacularly unsuccessful".) Operations by the USMC aboard USS Nassau in 1981 and by British Harriers and Sea Harriers in the Falklands War proved that the aircraft was highly effective in combat. These operations also demonstrated that "Harrier Carriers" provided a powerful presence at sea without the expense of big deck carriers. (Note: Politically, the British government had decided not to use aircraft carriers after the 1960s, due to the costs involved. The Invincible-class aircraft carriers had been developed under the official guise of being an anti-submarine Through Deck Cruiser, but the approved development of the Sea Harrier and the addition of ski-jumps to the design enabled ships of the Invincible class to perform as light aircraft carriers.)

Following the display of Harrier operations from small carriers, the navies of Spain and later Thailand bought the Harrier for use as their main carrier-based fixed-wing aircraft. (Note: Italy also became an operator of a "Harrier Carrier", but they only operated the second-generation McDonnell Douglas AV-8B Harrier II.) Spain's purchase of Harriers was complicated by long-standing political friction between the British and Spanish governments of the era; even though the Harriers were manufactured in the UK they were sold to Spain with the US acting as an intermediary. During tests in November 1972, the British pilot John Farley showed that the wooden deck of their aircraft carrier Dédalo was able to withstand the temperature of the gases generated by the Harrier. Since 1976, the Spanish Navy operated the AV-8S Matador from their aircraft carrier Dédalo; the aircraft provided both air defence and strike capabilities for the Spanish fleet. Spain later purchased five Harriers directly from the British government mainly to replace losses.

Spain sold seven single-seat and two twin-seat Harriers to Thailand in 1998. (Note: Spain sold its AV-8S Matadors following the introduction of new second generation Harrier II aircraft; as a result the Harrier I models were outdated and no longer required.) The Royal Thai Navy's AV-8S Matadors were delivered as part of the air wing deployed on the new light aircraft carrier HTMS Chakri Naruebet. The Thai Navy had from the start significant logistical problems keeping the Harriers operational due to a shortage of funds for spare parts and equipment, leaving only a few Harriers serviceable at a time. In 1999, two years after being delivered, only one airframe was in airworthy condition. Around 2003, Thailand considered acquiring former Royal Navy Sea Harriers, which were more suitable for maritime operations and better equipped for air defence, to replace their AV-8S Harriers; this investigation did not progress to a purchase. The last first-generation Harriers were retired by Thailand in 2006.

=== Potential operators ===
Some countries almost purchased Harriers. British Aerospace held talks with Argentina, Australia, Brazil, China, Switzerland and Japan.

==== Argentina ====
When the Argentinian Navy looked for newer fighters in 1968 the US government only offered old A-4A planes instead of the A-4Fs Argentina wanted. Argentina contacted the British government in 1969 and expressed interest in buying from six to twelve Harrier GR.1s. In 1969 the Argentinian Navy received its second carrier, ARA Veinticinco de Mayo, from the Netherlands. On her voyage home, Hawker Siddeley demonstrated a RAF Harrier GR.Mk.1 (XV757) but Argentina opted for the A-4Q Skyhawk instead. There were several problems to supply Argentina with Harrier jets and engines that prevented the deal from being closed, and when the US learned of the Harrier negotiations they quickly offered a better deal to Argentina. Some years later, before the 1982 war, British officials again offered Argentina an aircraft carrier and Sea Harrier aircraft.

==== Australia ====
Planning for a HMAS Melbourne aircraft carrier replacement began in 1981. After considering American, Italian, and Spanish designs, the Australian government accepted a British offer to sell HMS Invincible, which would be operated with Harriers and helicopters. However, the Royal Navy withdrew the offer after the Falklands War, and the 1983 election of the Australian Labor Party led to the cancellation of plans to replace Melbourne.

==== China ====
As early as 1972 the Chinese government started negotiating a purchase of up to 200 Harrier aircraft. Due to internal political issues, China put the negotiations on hold. In 1977 Li Chiang, the Chinese Minister of Foreign Trade, visited the UK and British Aerospace organised a Harrier flying demonstration. In November 1978, the Harrier-demonstration was repeated for the Chinese Vice-Premier Wang Chen during his UK visit. The Harrier deal would have meant British Government ignored United States laws that prohibited such sales to communist countries. British Prime Minister James Callaghan noted significant hostility from the USSR over the sales bid. In spite of that, British Aerospace convinced China that the Harrier was an effective close-support fighter and was good enough to act in a defensive role. In 1979, the Anglo-Sino deal was nearly finalised before being cancelled by the Sino-Vietnamese War.

==== Switzerland ====
The Swiss Air Force was interested in purchasing some Harriers as its doctrine was to operate in hidden and dispersed locations during the Cold War. British Aerospace held talks with Switzerland offering AV-8s to replace de Havilland Venoms. A demonstration was made by test pilot John Farley and XV742/G-VSTO in 1971.

== Variants ==
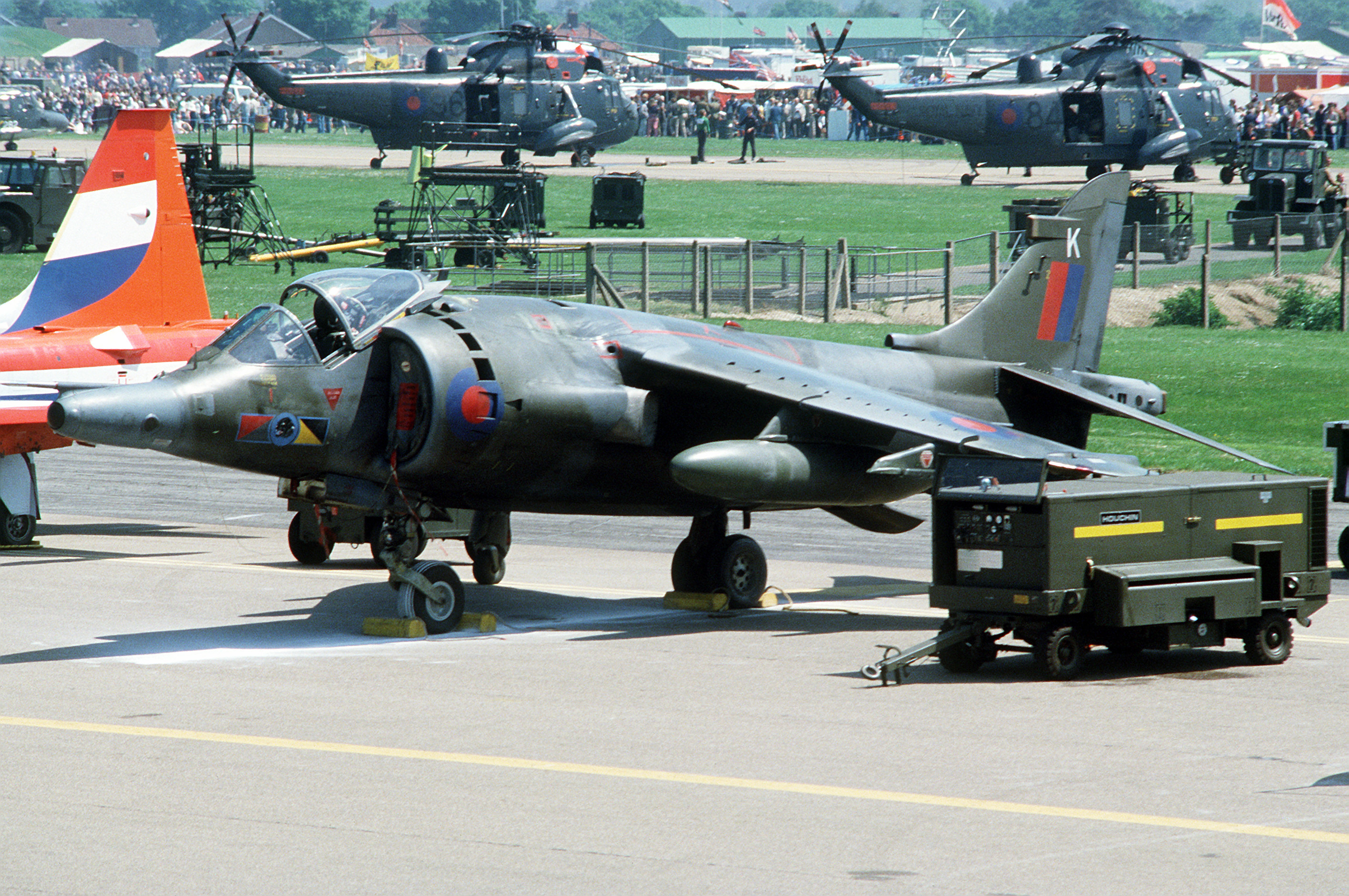
A Royal Air Force Harrier GR.3 aircraft parked on the flight line during Air Fete '84 at RAF Mildenhall.

Harrier GR.1, GR.1A, GR.3
Single-seat versions for the RAF. The RAF ordered 118 of the GR.1/GR.3 series, with the last production aircraft delivery in December 1986. 122 built.
AV-8A, AV-8C Harrier
Single-seat versions for the US Marine Corps. The USMC ordered 102 AV-8As (company designation: Harrier Mk. 50). The AV-8C was an upgrade to the AV-8A. 110 built.
AV-8S Matador
Export version of the AV-8A Harrier for the Spanish Navy, who designated them as VA.1 Matador; later sold to the Royal Thai Navy as the B.KhL.1 (Thai: บ.ขล.๑). 10 built.
Harrier T.2, T.2A, T.4, T.4A
Two-seat training versions for the RAF, with a stretched body and taller tail fin. 25 built.
Harrier T.4N, T.8, T.60
Two-seat training versions for the Royal Navy and Indian Navy with avionics based on the Sea Harrier.
TAV-8A Harrier
Two-seat training version for the USMC, powered by a Pegasus Mk 103.
TAV-8S Matador
Two-seat training version for the Spanish Navy and later sold to the Royal Thai Navy as the B.KhL.1A (Thai: บ.ขล.๑ก).

== Operators ==
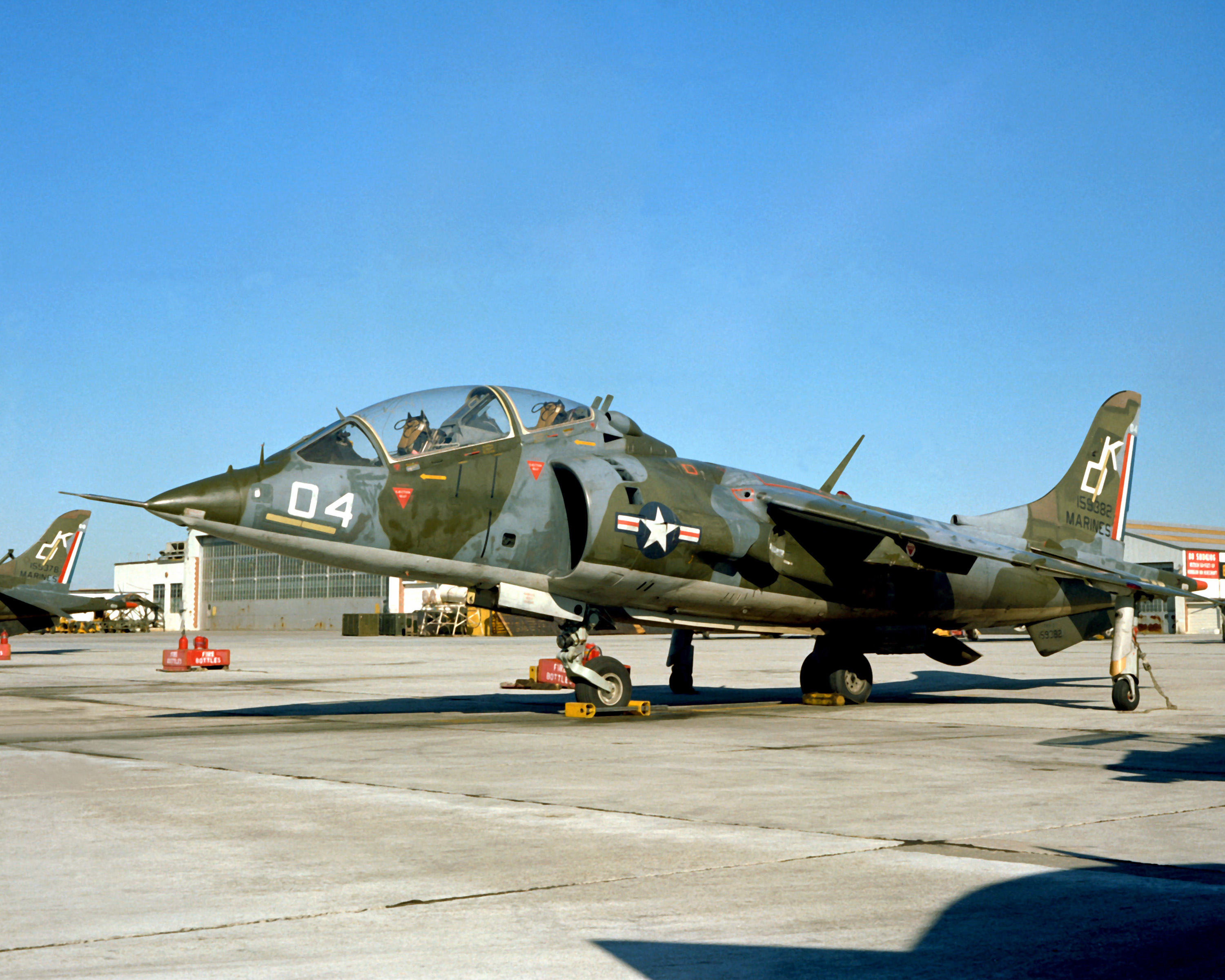
A USMC TAV-8A Harrier from VMAT-203 on the flight line

Spain

- Spanish Navy

Thailand

- Royal Thai Navy

United Kingdom

- Royal Air Force
- Royal Navy

United States

- United States Marine Corps

== Aircraft on display ==
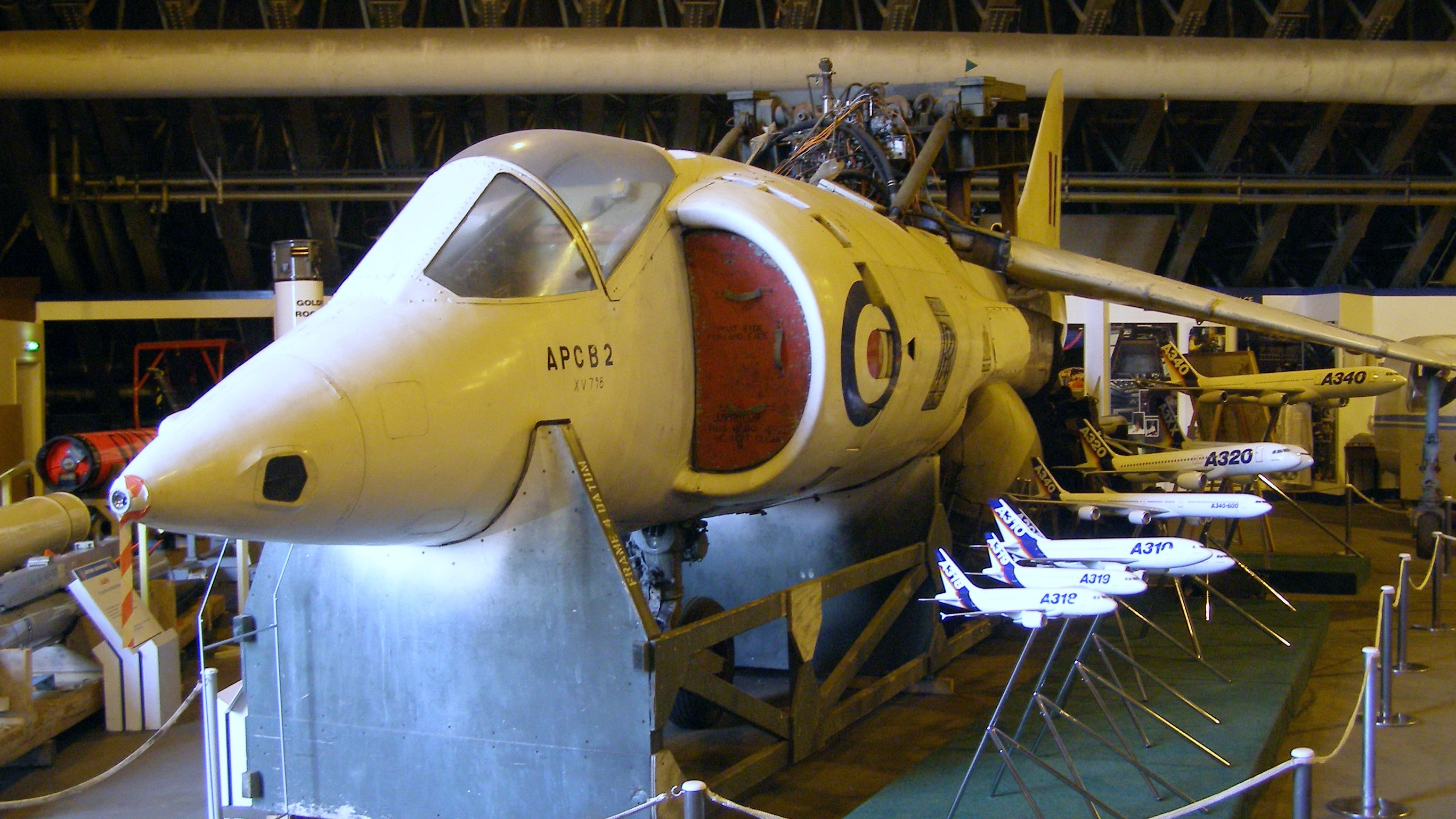
Former Harrier GR.1 that crashed in 1971 and used as a static engine test bed by Rolls-Royce, seen on display at the Bristol Aero Collection, Kemble, England

=== Estonia ===
GR.3

- XZ994 - Estonian Aviation Museum

=== Belize ===
GR.3

- ZD669 – Philip S. W. Goldson International Airport, Ladyville, Belize

No. 1417 Flight RAF

=== Canada ===
AV-8A

- 158966 – Canada Aviation and Space Museum, Ottawa, Ontario

=== China ===
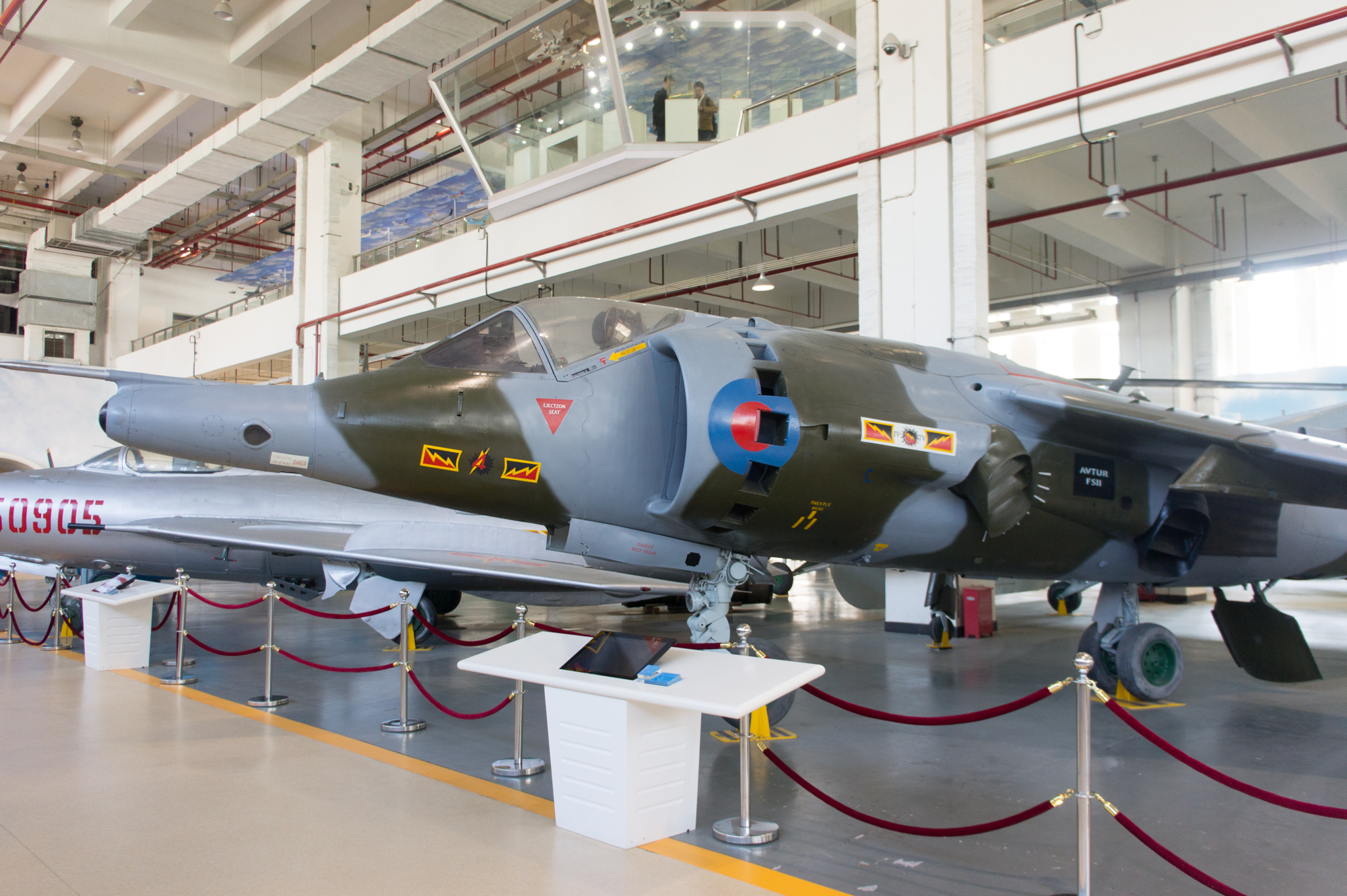
Harrier GR3 in Beijing Air and Space Museum

GR.3

- XZ965 – Beijing Air and Space Museum

=== Germany ===
GR.1

- XV278 – Luftwaffenmuseum der Bundeswehr, Gatow

GR.3

- XZ996 – Flugplatzmuseum Gütersloh at Gütersloh

GR.3

- XZ998 – Flugausstellung Hermeskeil at Hermeskeil

GR.3

ZD670 cockpit section – Flugplatzmuseum Gütersloh at Gütersloh

=== Poland ===
GR.3

- XW919 – Polish Aviation Museum, Kraków, Poland

=== New Zealand ===
GR.3

- XZ129 – Ashburton Aviation Museum, Ashburton, New Zealand

=== Thailand ===
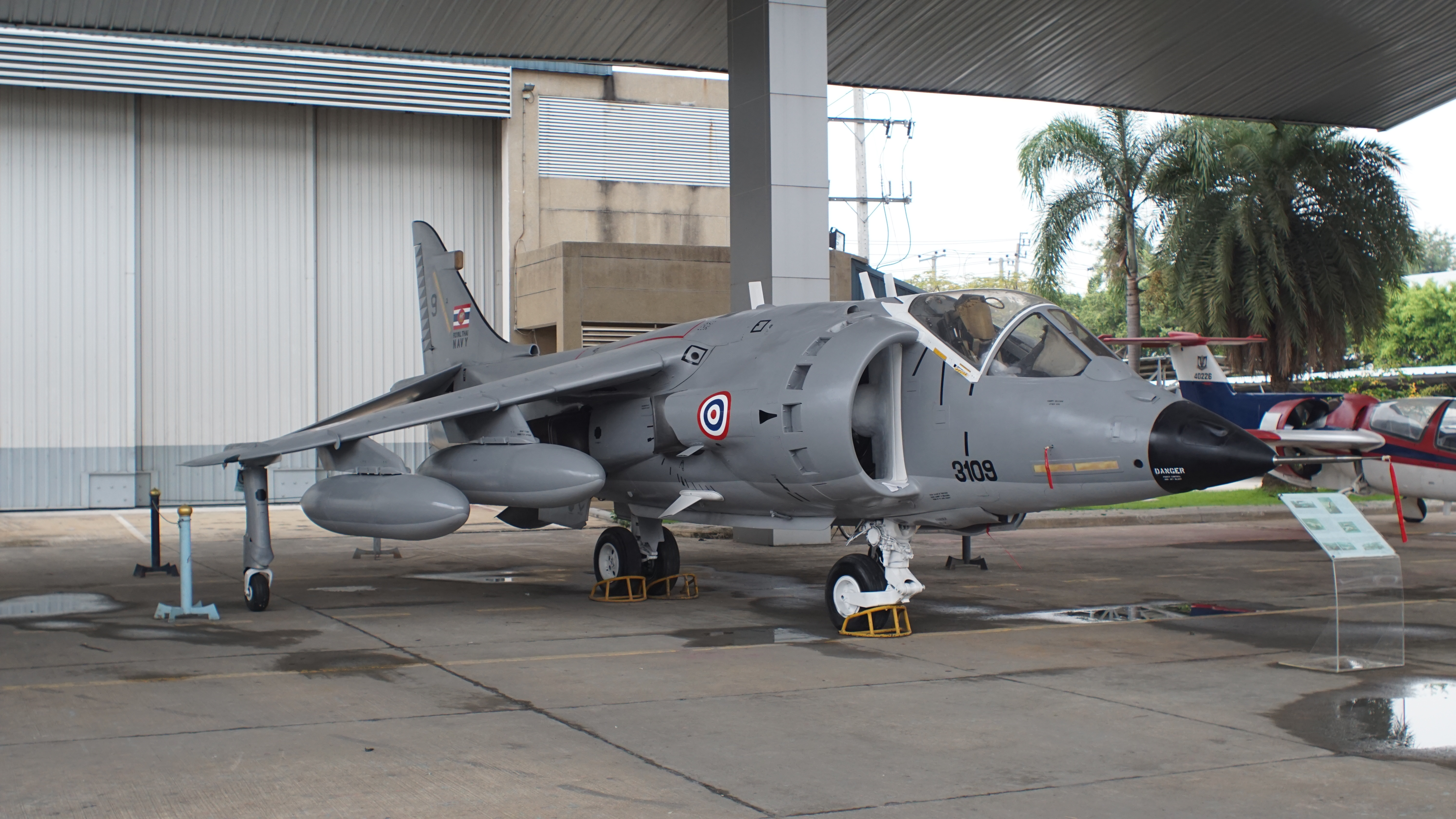
AV-8S Royal Thai Navy in Royal Thai Air Force Museum

AV-8S

- 3109 – Royal Thai Air Force Museum

=== United Kingdom ===
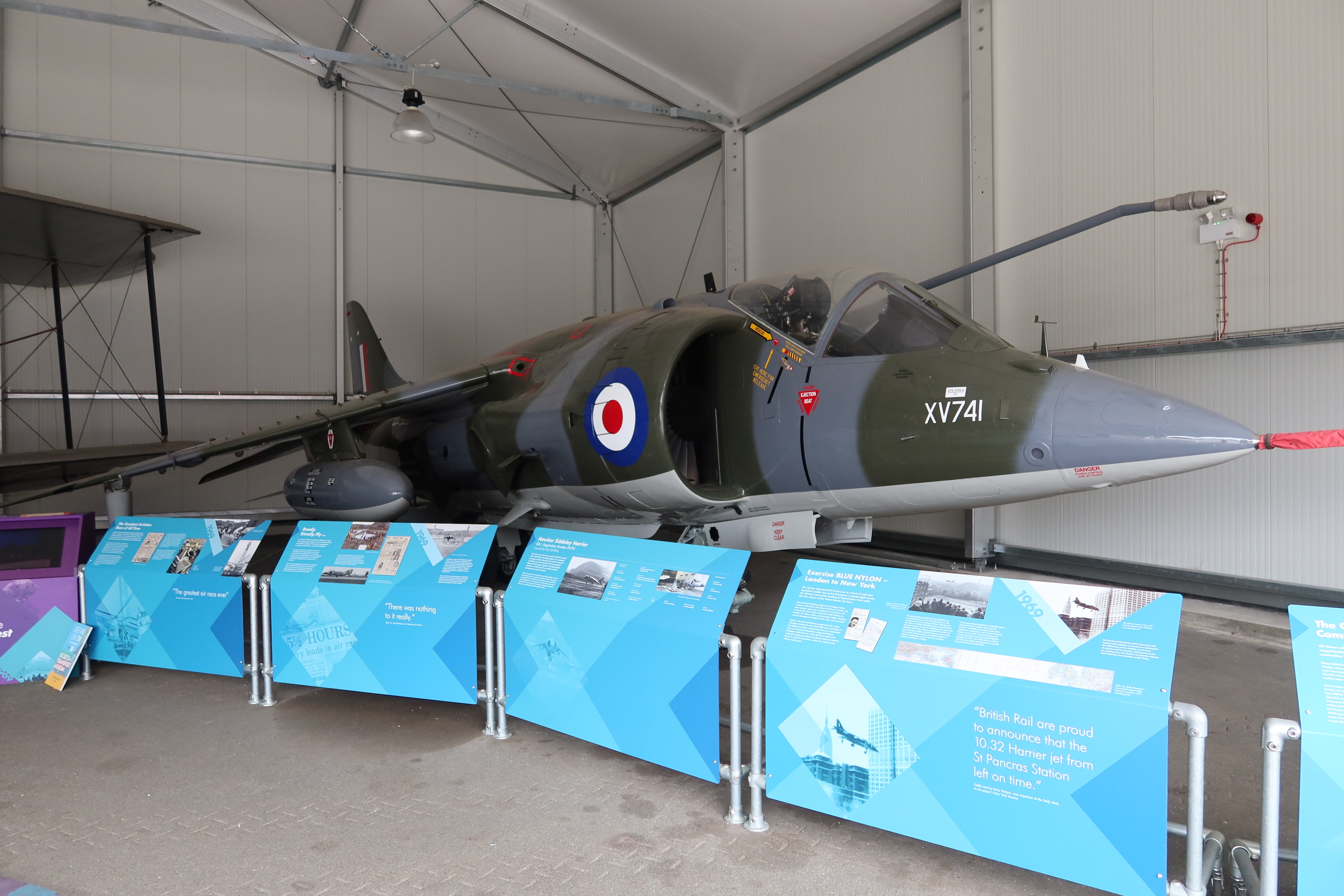
GR.1 XV741 at the Brooklands Museum, used in the 1969 Daily Mail Trans-Atlantic Air Race

GR.1

- XV277 – National Museum of Flight, East Fortune
- XV281 (under restoration) – South Yorkshire Aircraft Museum, Doncaster, South Yorkshire
- XV741 – Brooklands Museum, Surrey

GR.3

- XV744 – Tangmere Military Aviation Museum, Chichester, West Sussex
- XV748 – Yorkshire Air Museum, Elvington
- XV751 – Gatwick Aviation Museum, Surrey
- XV752 – South Yorkshire Aircraft Museum, Doncaster, South Yorkshire
- XV753 – Classic Air Force, St Mawgan, Newquay, Cornwall
- XV779 – RAF Wittering (Gate Guardian)
- XZ133 – Imperial War Museum, Duxford
- XZ964 – Royal Engineers Museum, Gillingham, Kent
- XZ968 – Muckleburgh Collection, Norfolk
- XZ997 – Royal Air Force Museum London, Hendon
- XZ971 – MoD Donnington, Telford
- ZD667 – Bentwaters Cold War Museum, Suffolk

Mk.52 G-VTOL

- ZA250 – Brooklands Museum, Surrey

T.2

- XW269 – Caernarfon Airworld Aviation Museum, Gwynedd

T.4

- XW934 – Farnborough Air Sciences Trust, Farnborough, Hampshire
- XW268 – Coventry University, Engineering and computing building, Coventry, West Midlands
- XW268 – City of Norwich Aviation Museum, Norfolk

AV-8A

- 159233 – Imperial War Museum North

=== United States ===
AV-8A

- 158695 – Air Park, MCAS Yuma, Yuma, Arizona
- 159239 – San Diego Air and Space Museum, San Diego, California
- 158963 – Craven County Regional Airport, Grantham, North Carolina
- 158976 – City of Havelock, Havelock, North Carolina
- Cockpit on display at Moffett Historical Museum, Moffett Federal Airfield, California

TAV-8A

- 159381 – Oakland Aviation Museum, Oakland, California
- 159382 – Pima Air & Space Museum, Tucson, Arizona

AV-8C

- 158387 – Fort Worth Aviation Museum, Fort Worth, Texas
- 158710 – Quonset Air Museum, North Kingstown, Rhode Island
- 158959 – Pacific Coast Air Museum, Santa Rosa, California
- 158975 – National Naval Aviation Museum, NAS Pensacola, Pensacola, Florida
- 158977 – Museum of Flight, Seattle, Washington
- 159232 – Intrepid Sea, Air & Space Museum, New York City, New York
- 159238 – Hangar 25 Museum, Webb AFB (formerly), Big Spring, Texas
- 159241 – Pima Air & Space Museum, Tucson, Arizona
- 159247 – Naval Inventory Control Point (NAVICP) Philadelphia, Philadelphia, Pennsylvania
- 159249 – United States Naval Museum of Armament and Technology, NCC China Lake (North), Ridgecrest, California

== Specifications (Harrier GR.3) ==
Data from Jane's All The World's Aircraft 1988–89

General characteristics

- Crew: 1
- Length: 46 ft 10 in (14.27 m)
- Wingspan: 25 ft 5 in (7.75 m)

29 ft 8 in (9 m) with ferry tips fitted

- Height: 11 ft 11 in (3.63 m)
- Wing area: 201.1 sq ft (18.68 m^{2})

216 sq ft (20 m^{2}) with ferry tips fitted

- Aspect ratio: 3.175

4.08 with ferry tips fitted

- Airfoil: root: Hawker 10%; tip: Hawker 3.3%
- Empty weight: 13,535 lb (6,139 kg)
- Max takeoff weight: 25,200 lb (11,431 kg)
- Fuel capacity: 5,060 lb (2,295 kg) internal

2× 100 imp gal (120 US gal; 450 L), 790 lb (358 kg) drop-tanks for combat
2× 330 imp gal (400 US gal; 1,500 L), 2,608 lb (1,183 kg) drop-tanks for ferry

- Powerplant: 1 × Rolls-Royce Pegasus 103 vectored-thrust high-bypass turbofan engine, 21,500 lbf (96 kN) thrust with water injection

Performance

- Maximum speed: 635 kn (731 mph, 1,176 km/h) at sea level
- Maximum diving speed: Mach 1.3
- Combat range: 360 nmi (410 mi, 670 km) ho-lo-hi with 4,400 lb (1,996 kg) payload

200 nmi (230 mi; 370 km) lo-lo with 4,400 lb (1,996 kg) payload

- Ferry range: 1,850 nmi (2,130 mi, 3,430 km) with 330 imp gal (400 US gal; 1,500 L) drop-tanks

3,000 nmi (3,500 mi; 5,600 km) with one AAR

- Endurance: 1 hour 30 minutes combat air patrol 100 nmi (120 mi; 190 km) from base.

7 hours plus with one AAR

- Service ceiling: 51,200 ft (15,600 m)
- g limits: +7.8 −4.2
- Time to altitude: 40,000 ft (12,192 m) in 2 minutes 23 seconds from a vertical take-off
- Take-off run CTOL: 1,000 ft (300 m) at max. TO weight

Armament

- Guns: 2× 30 mm (1.18 in) ADEN cannon pods under the fuselage
- Hardpoints: 4× under-wing & 1× under-fuselage pylon stations with a capacity of 5,000 lb (2,268 kg), with provisions to carry combinations of:
  - Rockets: 4× Matra rocket pods with 18× SNEB 68 mm rockets each
  - Missiles: 2× AIM-9 Sidewinders Air-to-air missiles
  - Bombs: A variety of unguided iron bombs, BL755 cluster bombs or laser-guided bombs
  - Others:
    - 1× Reconnaissance pod
    - 2× drop tanks for extended range/loitering time

Avionics

- Ferranti LRMTS
- Marconi ARI 18223 RWR
- Plessey U/VHF comms
- Ultra Electronics standby UHF
- GEC Avionics AD2770 TACAN
- Cossor IFF
- Ferranti FE541 INAS
- Sperry C2G compass
- Smiths HUD

== See also ==
- Aircraft in Fiction – the Harrier

Related development

- British Aerospace Harrier II
- British Aerospace Sea Harrier
- Hawker Siddeley P.1127/Kestrel
- McDonnell Douglas AV-8B Harrier II

Aircraft of comparable role, configuration, and era

- Rockwell XFV-12
- Yakovlev Yak-38
