= Caernarfon Airworld Aviation Museum =

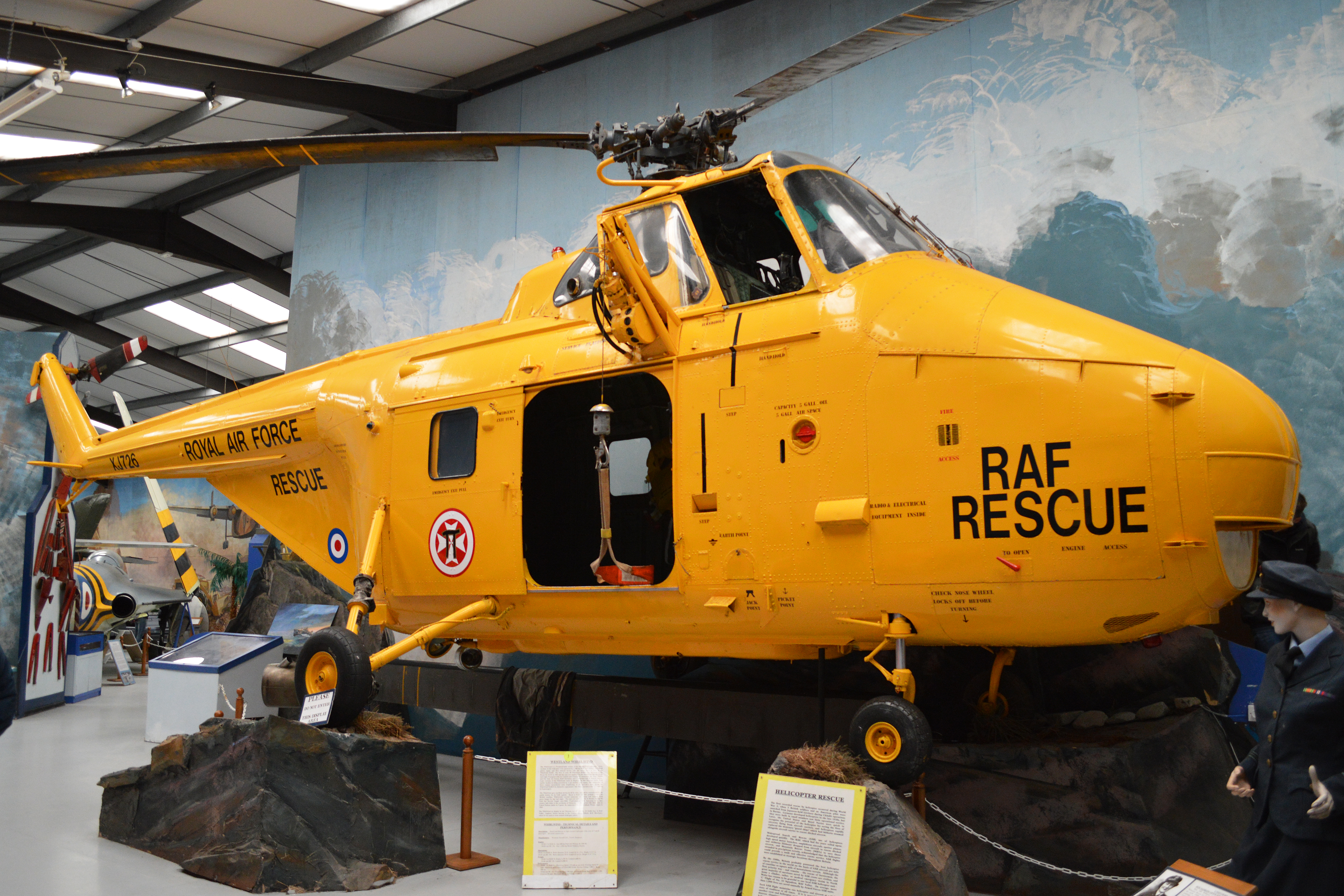
- Westland Whirlwind HAR10 XJ726 at Airworld Aviation Museum

- Location within Wales
- Established: 1988
- Location: Dinas Dinlle, Caernarfon, Gwynedd
- Coordinates: 53.100405°N 4.337360°W
- Type: Aviation museum
- Website: www.airworldmuseum.com

Caernarfon Airworld Aviation Museum is an air museum located on the former Royal Air Force station at Llandwrog, near Caernarfon in North Wales.

== History ==
The airfield was known as RAF Llandwrog, opening in January 1941 as a RAF Bomber Command airfield for training gunners, radio operators and navigators and closed after the end of the Second World War in 1945. Due to the large numbers of aircraft crashing in the nearby mountains of Snowdonia, it was here that the RAF Mountain Rescue Service was formed in 1943. Postwar, the airfield was used as a storage facility for chemical weapons recovered from Europe. It reopened in 1969 and remains in civil operation today as Caernarfon Airport.

The museum opened in 1988, and is located in a purpose-built hangar.

== Aircraft on display ==
The museum has the following aircraft on display:

- Westland Whirlwind helicopter
- Gloster Javelin (nose section)
- Hawker Sea Hawk
- de Havilland Vampire T11
- Hawker Hunter F1
- BAe Harrier T2
- Slingsby Kirby Cadet glider
- Bristol Sycamore helicopter (cabin)
- Vickers Varsity (cockpit)

== See also ==
- List of aviation museums
