= RAF Llandwrog =

Former Royal Air Force station in Gwynedd, Wales

RAF Llandwrog
- In the community of Llandwrog, near to Caernarfon, Gwynedd in Wales

Site information
- Type: Royal Air Force station
- Owner: Air Ministry
- Operator: Royal Air Force
- Controlled by: RAF Flying Training Command; *No. 25 Group RAF

Location
- Shown within Gwynedd RAF Llandwrog (the United Kingdom)
- Coordinates: 53°06′15″N 004°20′25″W

Site history
- Built: 1941
- Built by: Alfred McAlpine
- In use: 1941–1946
- Battles/wars: European theatre of World War II

Garrison information
- Occupants: 1944; Officers - 138 (4 WAAF); Other Ranks - 1,176 (164 WAAF)

Airfield information
- Elevation: 3 metres (10 ft) AMSL
Runways
Direction	Length and surface
02/20	1,000 yards (914 m) Asphalt concrete
08/26	1,100 yards (1,006 m) Asphalt concrete
14/32	1,000 yards (914 m) Asphalt concrete

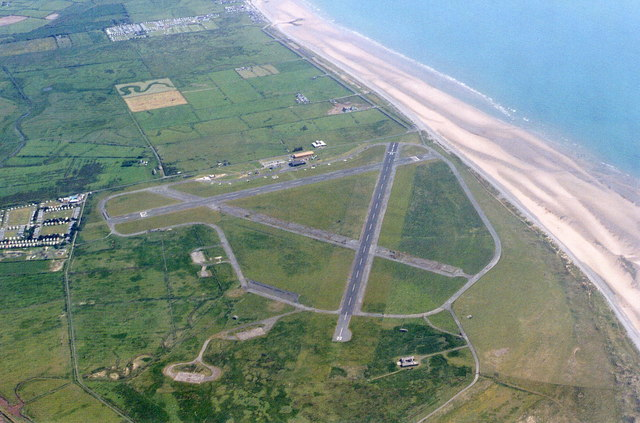
An aerial view of the airfield in 2003

Royal Air Force Llandwrog, or more simply RAF Llandwrog, is a former Royal Air Force station located near the village and in the community of Llandwrog, situated 3.5 miles (6 km) southwest of Caernarfon, Gwynedd, Wales.

The site opened in July 1941 as a RAF Flying Training Command airfield for training gunners, radio operators and navigators, but closed for flying in June 1945. Between 1946 and 1956 RAF Llandwrog was part of Operation Dismal and Operation Sandcastle, and it was home to a maintenance unit, No. 277 MU. It reopened in 1969 and remains in civil operation today as Caernarfon Airport.

== History ==
=== Location ===
RAF Llandwrog was near the south-western end of the Menai Strait, on a low-lying peninsula between the open sea (Caernarfon Bay) and Foryd Bay (the estuary of Afon Carrog and Afon Gwyrfai). The airfield was levelled out at exactly sea level. Conceived as a fighter station, this location would have suited interception of any aircraft attacking the northwest of the UK, and also defence against an enemy invasion from Ireland.

=== Station design ===
RAF Llandwrog was developed on the site of an older tank training ground. It was built with three runways, all 50 yards (46 m) wide, and organised into a triangle:

Details of runways
Orientation	Length
27/09 (West–East)	1,100 yards (1,006 m)
21/03 (South West–North East)	1,000 yards (914 m)
14/32 (South East–North West)	1,000 yards (914 m).

It had two T1 hangars, a single Bellman hangar and six blister hangars along the northern perimeter track. The technical, administration and hospital areas were on the south side of the runways, along with the air traffic control tower (to drawing No.12779/41) and the watch office (to drawing No.18441/40). Around the western perimeter facing the sea, a dyke was constructed. The airbase's defences included two Seagull trenches.

=== RAF Flying Training Command ===
The first unit to use the airfield was No. 11 Flying Training School RAF, which stayed for one month for an exercise, from June 1941, equipped with Avro Tutor, Hawker Audax, Gloster Gauntlet, Fairey Battle and Avro Anson aircraft.

No. 9 Air Gunnery School was the first tenant of the base when it opened at the end of January 1941. It was equipped with Armstrong Whitworth Whitley bombers and Avro Anson training aircraft. Two days after flying commenced, the airfield was attacked by a single Junkers Ju 88 bomber that strafed the airfield, damaging one Whitley. Airspeed Oxford trainers from No. 11 Service Flying Training School were deployed to Llandwrog in mid-1941 to complete its students' night flying requirements. The following year, three of its Whitleys were deployed to RAF Driffield to participate in the first "Thousand Bomber" raid on Cologne, Germany on the night of 30/31 May 1942, although one aircraft failed to return.

Several weeks later the Air Gunnery School was disbanded and the field became a satellite of No. 9 (Observers) Advanced Flying Unit at RAF Penrhos. The unit conducted its night-flying training at Llandwrog and later moved its headquarters there. It was disbanded on 14 June 1945 and flying activities ended. No. 2 Air Crew Holding Unit then became the tenant. The airfield was reactivated for private aircraft in 1969 in preparation for the Investiture of the Prince of Wales at nearby Caernarfon Castle and it was occasionally used from then on. Eventually, this became frequent enough that the airfield became Caernarfon Airport. The runways and taxiways are still intact, although the original hangars have been demolished.

One notable tragic incident occurred at RAF Llandwrog on the 10 October 1943, when two Armstrong Whitworth Whitley medium bomber aircraft, (K7252 and K9041), collided. Unaware of each other, the two aircraft attempted to land at the same time, and one landed on top of the other, wrecking both. Seventeen airmen were killed in the crash.

=== Chemical weapons storage ===
Almost 71,000 bombs containing the nerve agent Tabun had been seized in Germany at the end of the war, and these were stored in the open at RAF Llandwrog, until 1954 when, in Operation Sandcastle, they were transported to Cairnryan for disposal aboard scuttled ships at sea, 120 miles (190 km) north-west of Ireland.

=== Caernarfon Airport ===
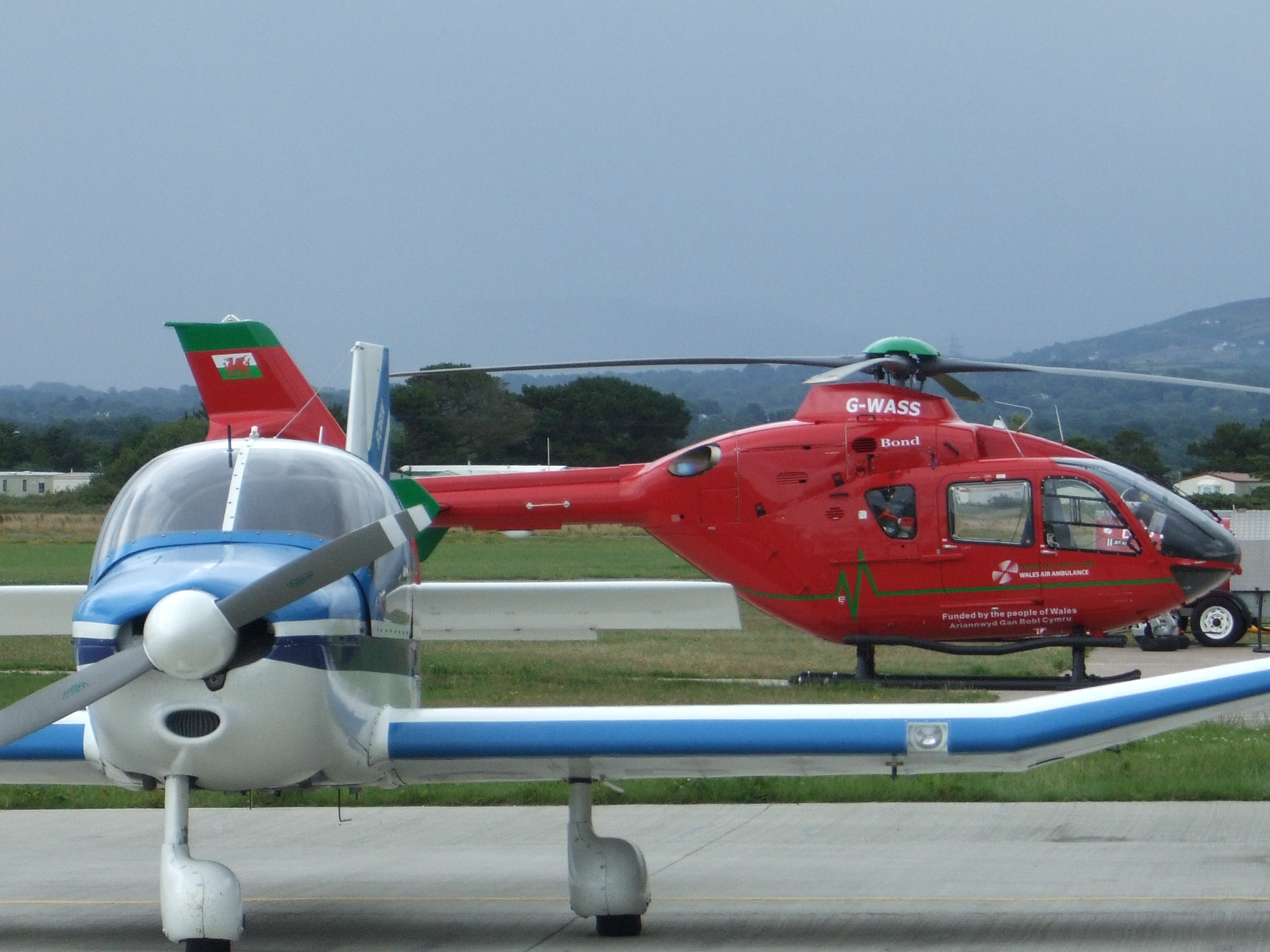
Caernarfon Airport, Dinas Dinlle, Gwynedd

The site is now used as Caernarfon airport and is also the home of the Caernarfon Airworld Aviation Museum. The airfield became inactive in November 1956; however, due to the Investiture of Charles, Prince of Wales at Caernarfon, light aircraft started using the airfield in greater numbers. It gained a full operating licence in 1976 and took the nearby town of Caernarfon for its identity.

Since then the airfield is now one of the homes of the Wales Air Ambulance. This is the third HEMS (Helicopter Emergency Medical Service) operation to use the Airbus Helicopter H145, a twin-engined light utility helicopter. The helicopters are leased and are operated on behalf of the charity by Babcock Mission Critical Services Onshore.

Bristow Helicopters operate one of its search and rescue helicopter operations here, on behalf of His Majesty's Coastguard.

== Royal Air Force operational history ==
=== No 9 Air Gunners School ===
No. 9 Air Gunners School RAF formed on 7 July 1941 at RAF Llandwrog. It operated:

- Armstrong Whitworth Whitley II, III, IV & V
- Fairey Battle
- Westland Lysander TT.I, II, III, TT. III & IIIA
- Avro Anson I

The unit used the Whitley bomber aircraft for turret training and the Lysander army co-operation and liaison aircraft for target towing, alongside the Battle light bomber, and the twin-engined, multi-role Anson aircraft.

The Moving Target Range at RAF Hell's Mouth was occasionally used. This was an old gun turret fixed on the ground and the trainees fired from it at a large, wooden model aircraft, which was attached to a motorised truck, that ran on a narrow-gauge railway. The classroom syllabus included the workings of the Vickers and Browning machine-guns, with practical work involving stripping and blockage clearing. Ammunition types were studied for example: tracer and armour-piercing. Turret workings and the Reflector sight were also part of the curriculum along with aircraft recognition.

Almost twelve months later the school disbanded on 13 June 1942, at RAF Llandwrog.

=== No 9 Observer Advanced Flying Unit ===
No. 9 Air Observers School RAF (9 AOS) moved its night-flying course, ‘D’ flight, formed of six Avro Anson aircraft, to RAF Llandwrog from RAF Penrhos, arriving as a lodger unit on 21 January 1942. 9 AOS was later redesignated as No. 9 (Observer) Advanced Flying Unit ((O)AFU), on 1 May 1942. RAF Flying Training Command decided to apply the British Commonwealth Air Training Plan, and observers on the first course provided by No. 9 (O)AFU took part in the first course of the Air Training Plan.

With No. 9 Air Gunners School RAF disbanding on 13 June 1942, RAF Penrhos took on parts of the gunnery training commitments relating to the observer training. RAF Llandwrog then became a Satellite Landing Ground for No. 9 (O)AFU. However, by the end of 1942 the number of No. 9 (O)AFU personnel at RAF Llandwrog was larger than those stationed at RAF Penrhos. RAF Llandwrog was the better airfield, and it was decided the roles of the two stations be reversed. RAF Llandwrog received the headquarters of No. 9 (O)AFU with RAF Penrhos reverting to the satellite. Following this change the Armstrong Whitworth Whitley aircraft were withdrawn. They were replaced by Bristol Blenheim Mk IV, a British light bomber aircraft. No.9 (O)AFU continued observer training at RAF Llandwrog until disbandment on 14 June 1945.

=== Other Units ===
==== No. 277 Maintenance Unit ====
No. 277 Maintenance Unit RAF formed at RAF Llandwrog on 29 July 1946 as an explosives disposal unit. At the end of the Second World War a quantity of chemical weapons was accumulated by the Nazis. A number of these weapons were brought to the UK for safe disposal. Some disused airfields were considered for the task and RAF Llandwrog was finally chosen because of its remote location. To enable the work to be done safely, twenty one Bellman hangars were erected on the three runways at RAF Llandwrog.

In October 1946 Operation Dismal led to 14,000 tonnes (13,800 long tons; 15,400 short tons) of Tabun nerve gas being stored at RAF Llandwrog. In 1954 a plan to dispose of the Tabun was created, simply putting it aboard ships and sinking them in the Atlantic Ocean. The disposal activity, code-named Operation Sandcastle, began in January 1955. RAF Llandwrog continued as an ammunition depot, until 14 September 1953.

==== No. 31 Maintenance Unit ====
No. 31 Maintenance Unit RAF, based at Llanberis, also in Gwynedd and also an ammunition depot, used RAF Llandwrog from 1951 on an interim basis. The 31 MU had used Glynrhonwy quarries near Llanberis, to hold the Tabun nerve gas before it was transferred to RAF Llandwrog. From March 1955, RAF Llandwrog became the parent depot for the Maintenance Unit. It was then allocated two satellite depots sites, one at Cairnryan, in Dumfries and Galloway, Scotland. and the other at Llanberis. This setup remained until the Maintenance Unit disbanded at RAF Llandwrog, which was in October 1956.

==== No.2 Aircrew Holding Unit ====
A short time after closure of the airfield, No. 2 Aircrew Holding Unit RAF was set up. For a few months the buildings were used as accommodation. Aircrew began to arrive from other stations within Nos. 25 and 29 Group, before being sent to other units or processed enabling a return to civilian life.

== RAF Llandwrog Mountain Rescue Section ==
Early in 1942, prompted by an increasing number of aircraft accidents in the North Wales mountains, the RAF Llandwrog Mountain Rescue Section was formed on a local, volunteer basis. The initiative came from the medical officer at RAF Llandwrog, Flight Lieutenant George Desmond Graham. The team at Llandwrog, and other similar teams elsewhere, were officially recognised towards the end of 1943. The Royal Air Force Mountain Rescue Service started operations in May 1943, but due to the administrative lag of wartime, it was not officially promulgated until January 1944. Flt Lt Graham was awarded the MBE in 1943 For Services to Mountain Rescue, he was then posted overseas to RAF Dum Dum as medical officer to No. 357 Squadron RAF and was awarded a DSO for a daring rescue behind Japanese lines in Burma (Myanmar).

== Current use ==
The main site is now Caernarfon Airport. Other parts of the site have been repurposed as workshops and small businesses, whilst many buildings remain largely untouched since the end of the war.

=== Gallery ===
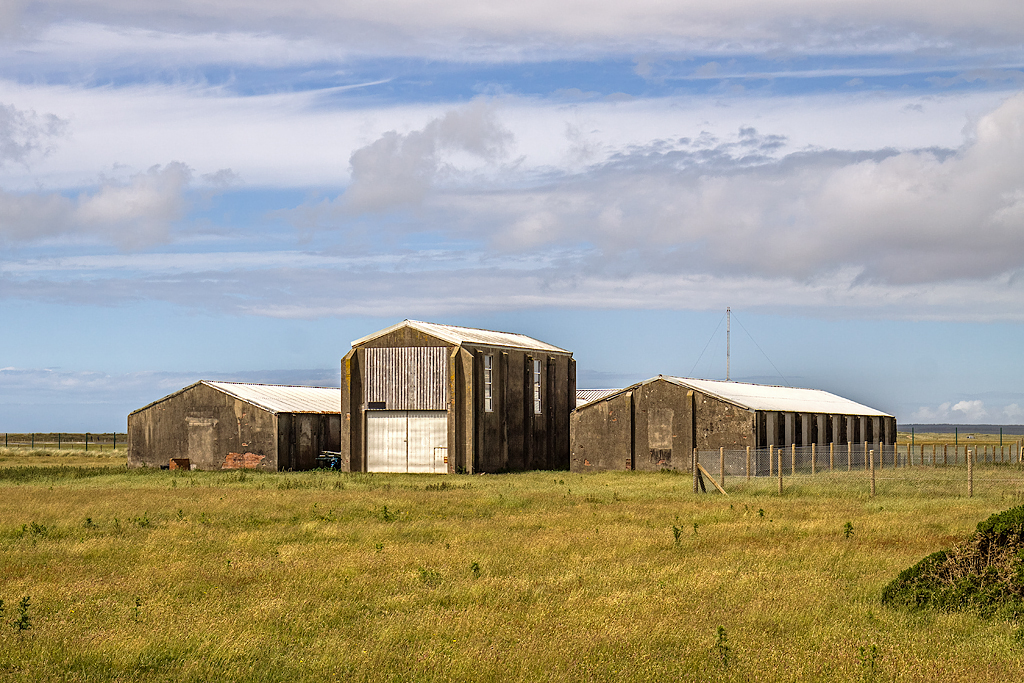
RAF Llandwrog airfield - Main Stores

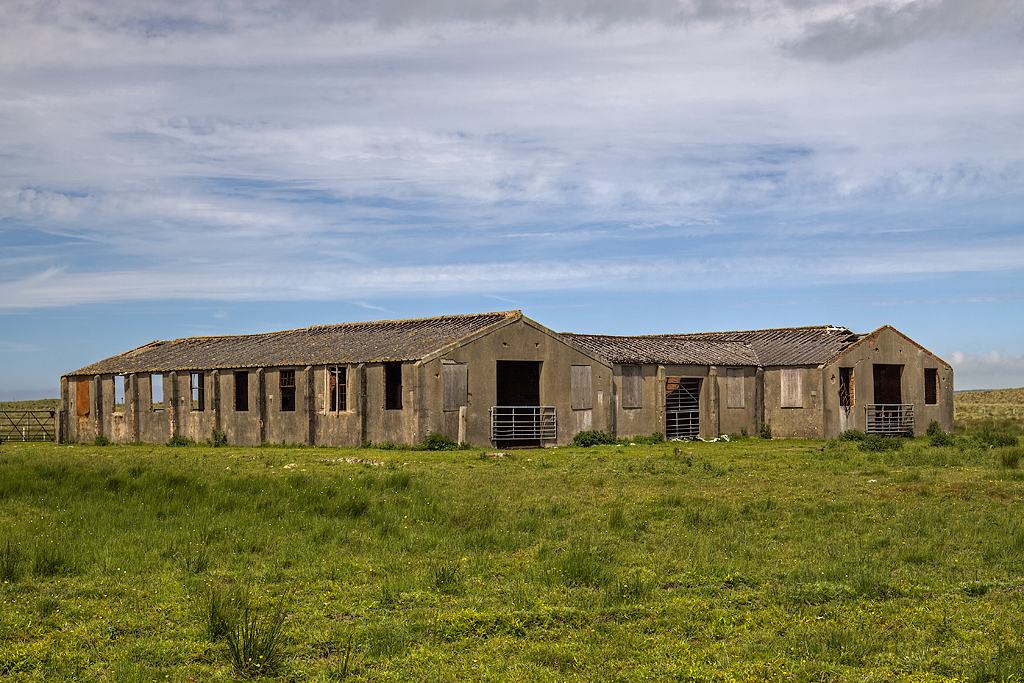
RAF Llandwrog airfield - Station Workshop

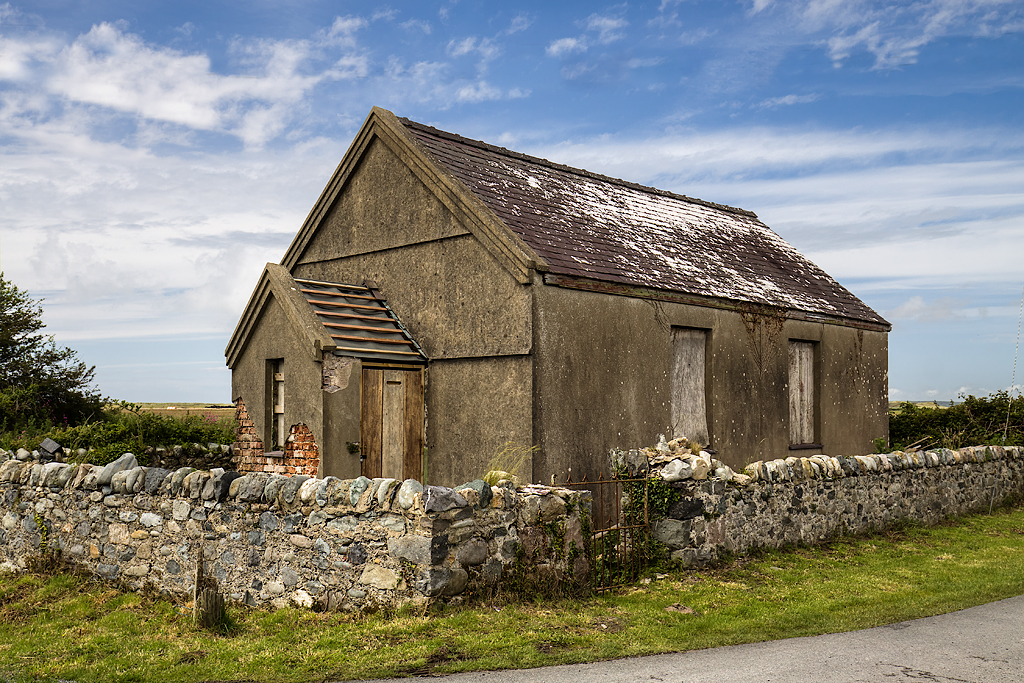
RAF Llandwrog airfield - Station Chapel (disused)

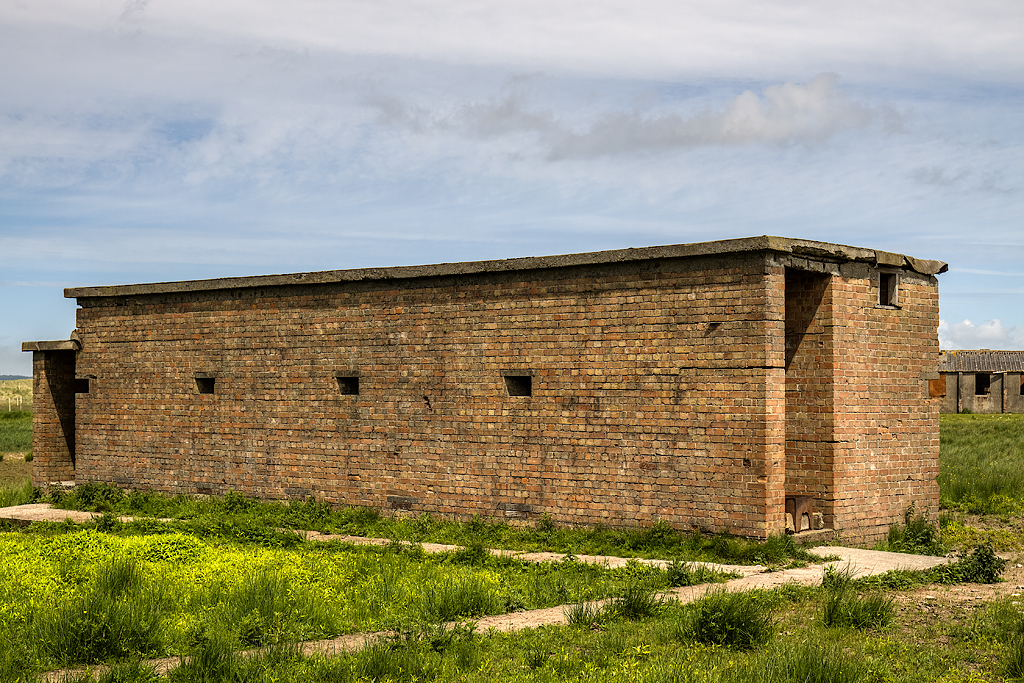
RAF Llandwrog airfield - Defended Air Raid Shelter

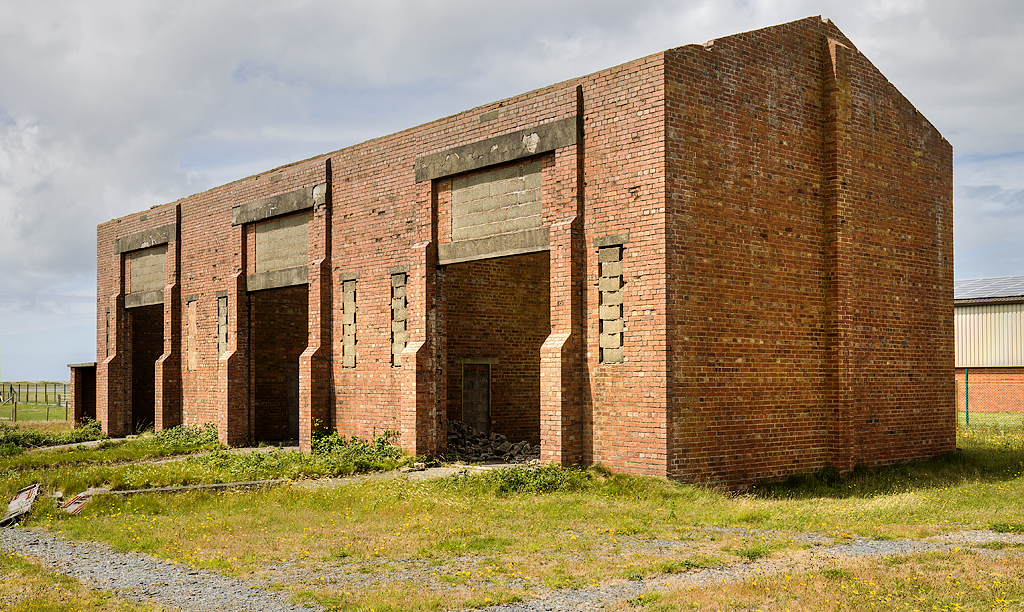
RAF Llandwrog airfield - Triple Turret Gunnery Trainer

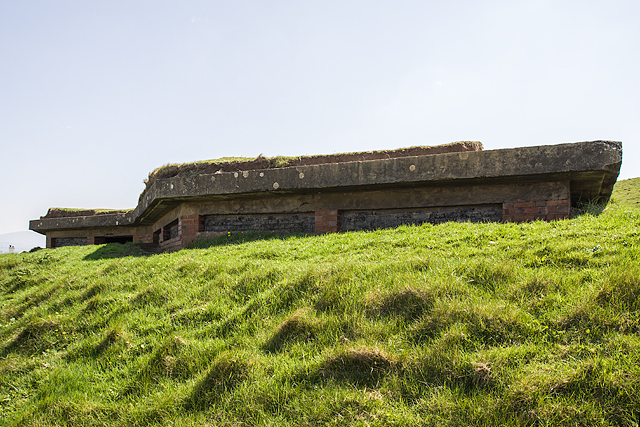
North Wales WWII defences: RAF Llandwrog, Dinas Dinlle - Seagull Trench

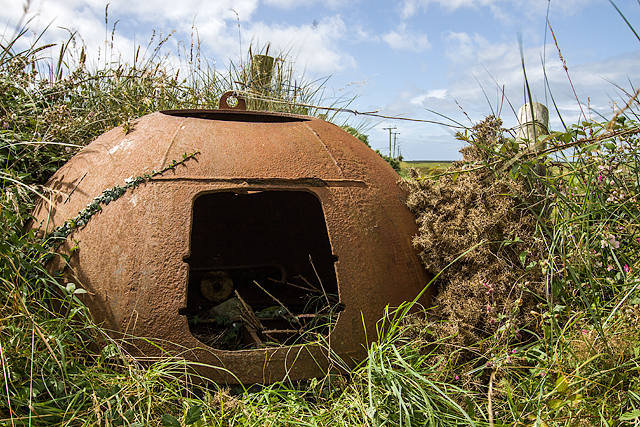
North Wales WWII defences: RAF Llandwrog, Morfa Dinlle - Allan Williams Turret

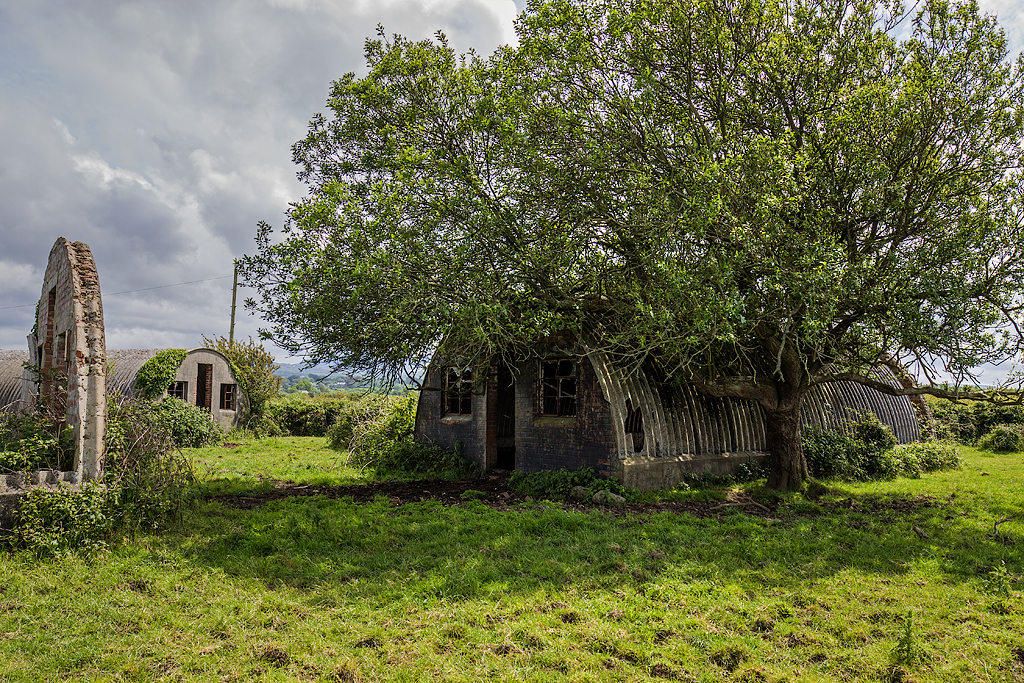
RAF Llandwrog domestic site - Site 3

== See also ==
- List of former Royal Air Force stations
- List of Royal Air Force schools
- Royal Air Force Mountain Rescue Service
- RAF Penrhos
