= Operation Sandcastle =

Operation Sandcastle was a United Kingdom non-combat military operation conducted between 1955–1956. Its purpose was to dispose of chemical weapons by dumping them in the sea.

== Background ==
The British possessed almost 71,000 air-dropped bombs of 250 kilograms in weight, each of which was filled with tabun. These had been seized from German ammunition dumps during the final months of World War II. A total of 250,000 tons of German chemical weapons had been discovered, the majority of which were destroyed because they comprised warfare agents which the allies already possessed in great abundance e.g. mustard gas at sites such as RAF Bowes Moor. However, the stocks of tabun and sarin were considered more valuable because the allies did not possess nerve agent technology at that time. As a result, captured stocks of German nerve agents were divided between Britain and the United States after discussion, with the Americans taking the sarin. The British transferred their 14,000 tons of ordnance containing tabun in October 1945, via Hamburg and Newport, to temporary storage at the RAF strategic reserve ammunition store at Llanberis. Longer term facilities were prepared at RAF Llandwrog where the bombs were to be stored in stacks, out in the open, on the runways of the disused airfield. The intention was that any leaks of nerve agent would be dispersed by the prevailing winds. The bombs were transported to Llandwrog by truck from August 1946 to July 1947.

In July 1947 it was discovered that the bombs were fuzed and a number of them were leaking nerve agent. The fact that the bombs had fuzes inserted meant that they were inherently unsafe: to reduce the risk of accidental detonation, standard practice is to avoid installing the fuze in any air-dropped bomb until shortly before it is loaded onto an aircraft to be used in combat. For similar reasons bomb fuzes are always stored separately, well away from bombs. This was not the case with the 250 kilogram tabun bombs at RAF Landwrog. Not only had the bombs been left with fuzes inserted for a considerable amount of time (possibly years), but they were also left exposed to the elements creating a corrosion risk, together with the inevitable temperature fluctuations which resulted from changing weather. None of these factors was accepted practice regarding the safe, long-term storage of bomb fuzes or explosive ordnance in general.

At a rate of 500 bombs a week they were defuzed and individually coated in a waxy preservative to seal them. Seventy-two irreparable devices were neutralised on-site by being drained into individual pits filled with caustic soda crystals. Despite being given a preservative covering the bombs continued to suffer in the damp Welsh climate and in 1951 twenty-one Bellman hangars were erected on the site to store the bombs. Finally in June 1954 it was decided to dispose of the entire stock because by then it was recognised that not only did the weapons have no military value but they had actually become a liability, which could only become worse as time passed.

== Logistics ==
Operation Sandcastle was divided into two sections, a sea voyage to Cairnryan and then a transfer to suitable hulks there for later sinking north-west of Ireland beyond the continental shelf. It was intended to process 16,000 bombs in the first attempt in mid-1955.

The work began with the construction of a road between Llandwrog and the nearby port of Fort Belan where six tank landing craft were assembled. Loading trials in June indicated only 400 bombs could be loaded on each craft, fewer than hoped. It was then decided to remove the tail-fins from the bombs to reduce their length, and to pack them in new boxes. This work increased each craft's load to 800 bombs and by mid-July all 16,000 devices had been safely carried to Cairnryan.

== Disposal at sea ==
The SS Empire Claire was the first scuttling ship. Its loading began in late June, and by 23 July all 16,000 bombs were aboard, although an ill-considered loading plan had given it a noticeable list to starboard. The three scuttling charges of TNT were positioned to ensure its sinking would be steady and flat, and the nine-man crew embarked. Departure was delayed by industrial action on the Firth of Clyde preventing the departure of the ocean-going tugboat Forester.

On 25 July 1955 the SS Empire Claire, SS Forester, and navy escorts Mull and Sir Walter Campbell left Cairnryan. The Empire Claire soon broke down and was taken under tow. They reached the scuttling point (56°30′00″N 12°00′00″W) in the early morning of 27 July, but waited until 10:00am for the arrival of an RAF photo-reconnaissance aircraft to observe the operation. The initial two scuttling charges blew and dramatically increased the vessel's starboard list, forcing the use of the emergency charge to open its stern and cause it to sink rapidly, bows up, to a depth of around 2,500 metres (8,200 ft).

The later sinking went without any problems. MV Vogtland was scuttled on 30 May 1956 at the same site, taking 28,737 bombs with it, and on 21 July 1956 the SS Kotka was sunk (at 56°31′00″N 12°05′00″W) with 26,000 bombs, 330 tons of arsenic compounds, and three tons of toxic seed dressings.

== Bibliography ==
- Defence Science and Technology Laboratory (2 August 2006). "Sarin Gas Letter" (PDF). Archived from the original (PDF) on 9 November 2012.
- Bless 'em all - aspects of the war in North West Wales, Reg Chambers Jones, Bridge Books, ISBN 1-872424-48-1
- The Tale of Tabun - Nazi chemical weapons in North Wales, Roy Sloan, Carrge Gwalch, ISBN 0-86381-465-4
