= Caernarfon Airport =

Caernarfon Airport Maes Awyr Caernarfon
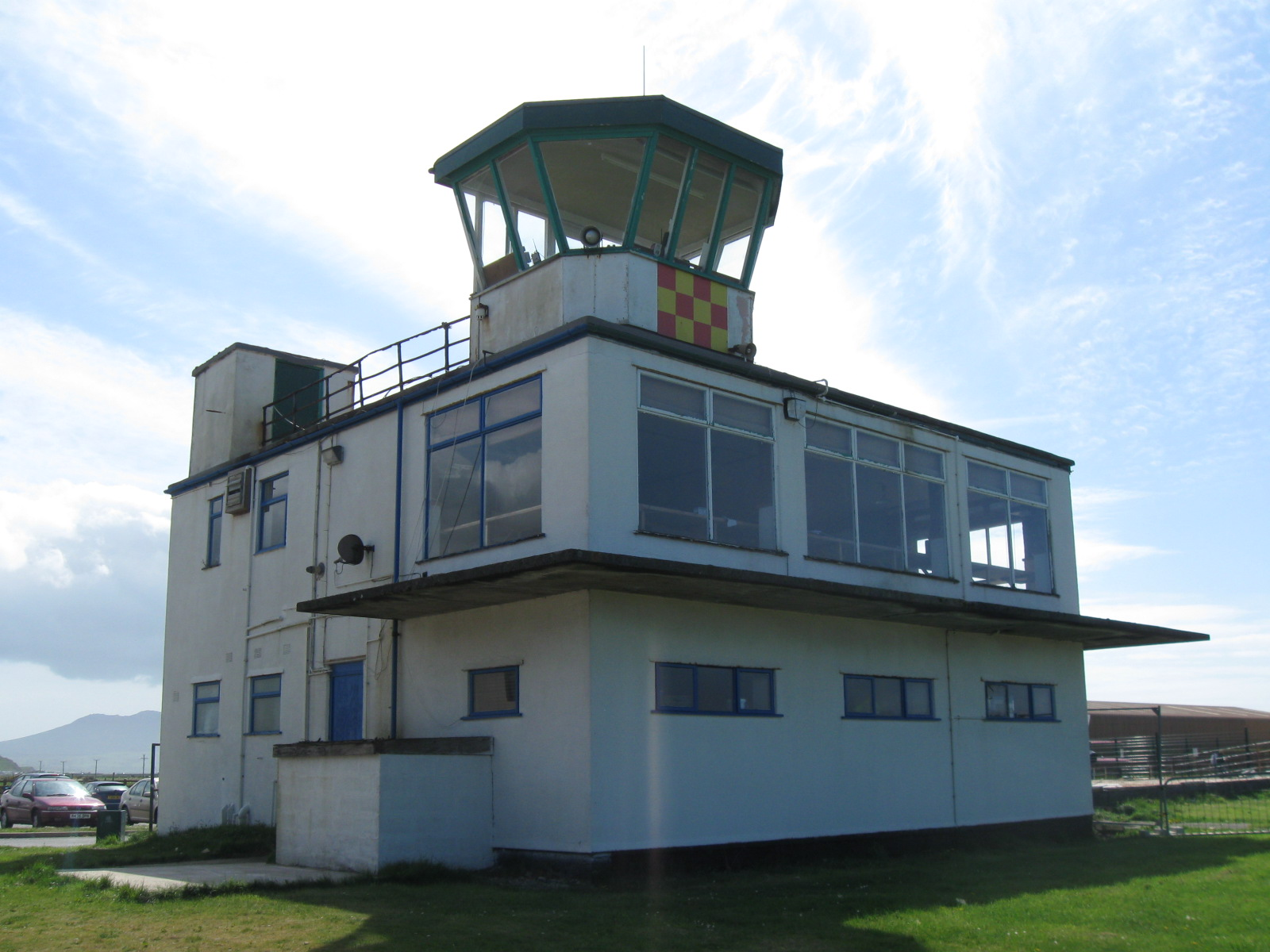
- IATA: none; ICAO: EGCK

Summary
- Airport type: Public
- Operator: Air Caernarfon Ltd
- Location: Dinas Dinlle, Caernarfon, Gwynedd, Wales, UK
- Elevation AMSL: 14 ft / 4 m
- Coordinates: 53°06′06″N 004°20′15″W
- Website: www.caernarfonairport.com

Map
- Location in Gwynedd EGCK (the United Kingdom)

Runways
| Direction | Length | | Surface |
| Direction | m | ft | Surface |
|---|---|---|---|
| 02/20 unlicensed | 1,080 | 3,543 | Asphalt |
| 07/25 | 932 | 3,058 | Asphalt |
- Sources: UK AIP at NATS

Caernarfon Airport (Welsh: Maes Awyr Caernarfon) (ICAO: EGCK), is a general aviation airport located 4 nautical miles (7.4 km; 4.6 mi) southwest of Caernarfon, Gwynedd, Wales. It is on the site of the former RAF Llandwrog which was operational between 1941 and 1946. From the end of the 1960s, civil light aircraft started to use the aerodrome in greater numbers and eventually gained a full operating licence in 1976.

== Operations ==
Caernarfon Aerodrome has a Civil Aviation Authority (CAA) Ordinary Licence (Number P866) that allows flights for the public transport of passengers, or for flying instruction as authorised by the licensee (Air Caernarfon Limited). The aerodrome is not licensed for night use. The airport has a single licensed runway: 07/25. There is also an unlicensed runway: 02/20, and a disused runway (was 14/32). These initially formed a triangle layout, commonly used during the Second World War.

The airport is mainly used by small fixed-wing aircraft, helicopters and microlights. Several companies based at the airport offer flight training. North Wales Flight Academy offers fixed-wing training for the issue of a PPL (A) and other fixed-wing qualifications. Microlight traffic forms a considerable part of the local aerodrome traffic and flight training is provided by The Microlight School. Helicopter training is also undertaken at the airport by Geo Helicopters. It is also possible to have pleasure flights and charters from the airport. There is also a helicopter simulator located inside the Caernarfon Airworld Aviation Museum.

=== Search and Rescue ===
In 2013, the Department for Transport (DfT) handed out the contract to manage search and rescue for the Maritime and Coastguard Agency during the next ten years to Bristow Helicopters, using two Sikorsky S-92 helicopters. Since 1 July 2015, search and rescue operations have commenced at Caernarfon Airport.

=== Wales Air Ambulance ===
The airfield is now one of the homes for the Wales Air Ambulance. The HEMS (Helicopter Emergency Medical Service) operates the Airbus Helicopters H145, a twin-engined light utility helicopter from Caernarfon. The helicopters are leased and are operated on behalf of the charity by Babcock Mission Critical Services Onshore.

== Facilities ==
During the 2000s, the airport underwent significant re-development and expansion. At the aerodrome, there is a large café, a maintenance and storage hangar, and a visitor centre and shop which are part of the Aviation Museum at the site.

== History ==
The airfield opened in July 1941 as an RAF Flying Training Command airfield for training and closed for flying in June 1945. It was built with three runways, all 50 yards (46 m) wide, and organised into a triangle: 27/09 1,100 yards (1,006 m), 21/03 1,000 yards (914 m) and 14/32 1,000 yards (914 m). It had two T1 hangars, a single Bellman hangar and six blister hangars along the northern perimeter track. The technical, administration and hospital areas were on the south side of the runways, along with the air traffic control tower and the watch office.

=== RAF Flying Training Command ===
No. 9 Air Gunners School RAF formed in July 1941 at RAF Llandwrog. Almost twelve months later the school disbanded in June 1942. The unit operated the Armstrong Whitworth Whitley bomber aircraft for turret training and the Westland Lysander army co-operation and liaison aircraft for target towing, alongside the Fairey Battle light bomber, and the twin-engined, multi-role Avro Anson aircraft from Llandwrog. No. 9 Air Observers School RAF (9 AOS) moved its night-flying course, ‘D’ flight, formed of six Avro Anson aircraft, to RAF Llandwrog from RAF Penrhos, arriving as a lodger unit in January 1942. 9 AOS was later redesignated as No. 9 (Observer) Advanced Flying Unit ((O)AFU), in May 1942. No.9 (O)AFU continued observer training at RAF Llandwrog until disbandment in June 1945.

== See also ==
- List of airports in the United Kingdom and the British Crown Dependencies
- RAF Llandwrog, former airfield now Caernarfon Airport
- Bristow Helicopters operate a search and rescue helicopter operation from Caernarfon Airport on behalf of His Majesty's Coastguard
- Babcock Mission Critical Services Onshore lease helicopter to, and operate on behalf of, Wales Air Ambulance
