= Nantlle Valley =

Area of Gwynedd, Wales

Coordinates: 53°01′30″N 04°17′00″W

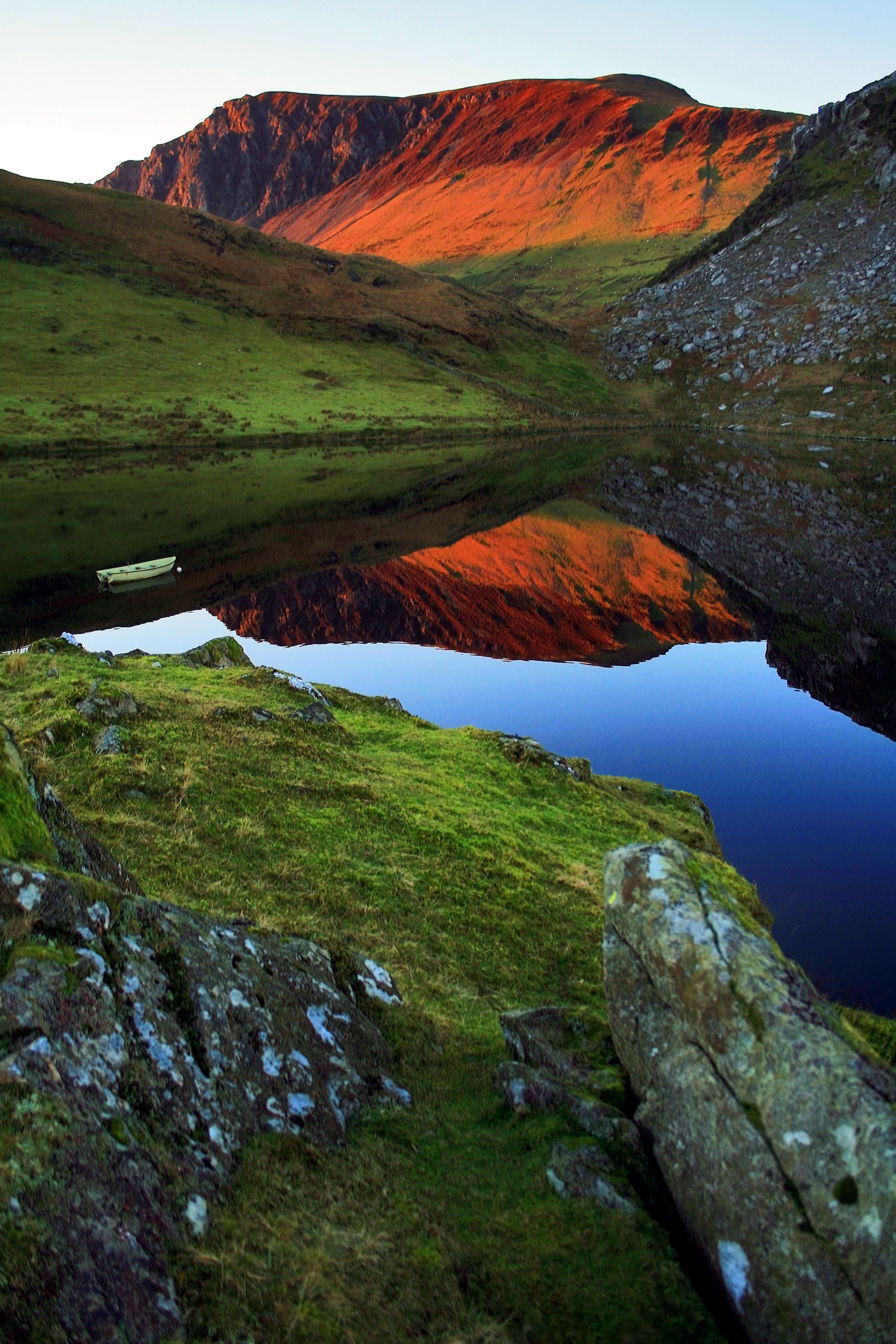
Nantlle Valley at sunset

The Nantlle Valley (Welsh: Dyffryn Nantlle, IPA: [ˈdəfrɨn ˈnantɬɛ]) is an area in Gwynedd, north Wales, containing numerous small settlements. The valley contains several historic slate quarries, and the horse-drawn Nantlle Railway, opened in 1828, was built mainly to carry slate. It remained in use until 1963, when its closure ended the last recorded use of horses by British Railways.

The valley has longstanding associations with Welsh culture and literature. It is a principal setting of the Fourth Branch of the Mabinogi and features in local folklore, while a number of prominent Welsh writers and performers have connections with the area. The Nantlle Ridge is a well-known walking route, and tourism in the valley draws on its mountain landscape, industrial heritage and attractions including Glynllifon and Dinas Dinlle.

== Geology ==
Moel Tryfan was an important site in the development of glacial theory during the 19th century. Its shelly drift deposits became a focus of debate between "Diluvialists", who attributed such deposits to the Biblical flood, and "Glacialists", who argued for a glacial origin.

== History and archaeology ==
The area contains evidence of prehistoric settlement. Caer Engan is an Iron Age hillfort, while Dinas Dinlle is a coastal hillfort dating from the Iron Age, with occupation continuing into the Roman period. There is also evidence of human activity in the Nantlle Valley from the Bronze Age, including burial cairns and burnt mounds on its northern slopes.

Clynnog Fawr was an important ecclesiastical centre during the medieval period and was associated with a clas.

== The Nantlle Railway ==
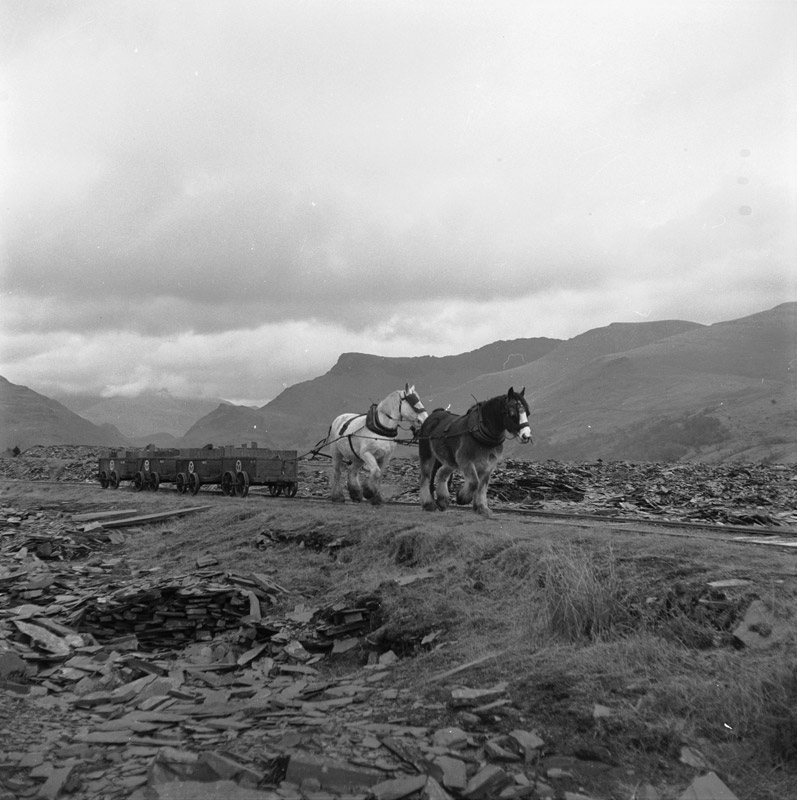
The Nantlle Railway

The horse-drawn 3 ft 6 in (1,067 mm) gauge Nantlle Railway served the quarries from 1828 to 1963, although from 1865 the line was cut back to Tyddyn Bengam, and in 1871 only the portion from the standard gauge railhead at Nantlle railway station in Talysarn was in use. The Nantlle Railway has a long history as an industrial and passenger line.

The line received its Act of Parliament in 1825 and was constructed under the supervision of Robert Stephenson, brother of George Stephenson. It opened in 1828 and was operated using horse power. Although built mainly for the transport of slate, the line is known to have carried passengers at various times between Caernarfon and Pen-y-groes.

It is the last recorded use of horses by British Railways, and closed only with the closure of the branch line to which it connected after the Beeching Review in 1963.

== Culture ==
The Nantlle Valley is famous within Wales for being the main setting of the Fourth branch of the Mabinogi, Math fab Manawydan, the story of Lleu Llaw Gyffes, Blodeuwedd and Gwydion. The story is set mainly in the area with Gwydion finding Lleu transfigured into an eagle in an oak tree at Baladeulyn (the ground that used to exist between the two lakes before industrialisation). There are numerous references to the valley in the Welsh Triads (Trioedd Ynys Prydain) as well.

The valley was noted for its woodlands and was an important area in the Middle Ages, being used as a hunting park for the royal family of Gwynedd. After the Edwardian conquest in 1282, one of the first recorded jousts in Britain was held on the fields of Baladeulyn near the village of Nantlle as the royal entourage made its way from Nefyn after the war. Rules were apparently drawn up here which later were the basis of the 1292 Statute of Arms issued by Edward I to regulate jousting.

The area is also famous for the variety, breadth and amount of folk-lore associated with fairies, right up until the present times. This lore was recorded extensively by John Owen Huws in the 1970s and 1980s and published in his landmark three-volume work Straeon Gwerin Ardal Eryri (Gwasg Carreg Gwalch, 2008).

The Nantlle Valley also became one of the power-houses of Welsh literature during the 20th century. Notable examples include the poetsT.H. Parry-Williams from Rhyd Ddu and R. Williams Parry from Talysarn. Mathonwy Hughes, from Mynydd Cymffyrch, and Gwilym R. Jones, from Talysarn, grew up in the valley, as did the modern dramatist John Gwilym Jones (of Y Groeslon) and the novelist Kate Roberts (Rhosgadfan) also grew up there. Prolific author of children's and young adult novels J. Selwyn Lloyd was born near Talysarn. Angharad Tomos, author and children's author from Llanwnda, also attended the local secondary school and now lives in Pen-y-groes, as does the American-born Welsh-speaking author Professor Jerry Hunter.

World renowned opera singer Bryn Terfel grew up in Pant Glas, on the outskirts of the valley, and attended the local schools Ysgol Llanllyfni and Ysgol Dyffryn Nantlle. Singer and actor Bryn Fôn from Llanllyfni and actor and author Mari Gwilym grew up in Pontllyfni. In the earlier part of the 20th century Nantlle produced the Brodyr Francis (the Francis Brothers) who toured Wales and beyond.

In the 19th century the valley had a number of brass and silver bands. Some famous for their playing ability, such as the Nantlle Royal Silver Band, are still extant. Others were more noted for their drinking ability and prowess with their fists, notably the Llanllyfni brass band and some of the Pen-y-Groes brass bands.

== Mountains ==
The Nantlle Ridge is regarded by many walkers as a classic route in the UK. Although usually classed as a 'moderate' walk with only minimal scrambling on the eastern side, it can be a challenge because of its route being mainly a traverse only, and therefore usually needing transport at the end of the walk back to the start point; and also because of the changeable weather — as the westernmost limb of Snowdonia, the area can be the first to experience bad weather coming in from the Atlantic. The views, though, are considered some of the best in North Wales, with the Snowdon massif to the east, Anglesey to the north, the expanse of Caernarfon Bay and the Llŷn Peininsula to the west, and Cardigan bay and the Welsh coast all the way down to Pembrokeshire visible to the south. It is regularly voted one of the best and quietest routes in Snowdonia (19th on the 50 Greatest Hill Routes in Trail magazine, 2009; 21st in the Greatest Ridge walks in the UK in The Great Outdoors magazine, 2013).

The Nantlle Ridge has two Marilyns and four Hewitts on the route; the ridge is about 8–9 miles long and the high point is Craig Cwm Silyn at 2,408 feet:

Y Garn: 2,077 ft - 633 m (Nuttall) Mynydd Drws y Coed: 2,280 ft - 695 m (Hewitt) Trum y Ddysgl: 2,326 ft - 709m (Marilyn) Craig Cwm Silyn: 2,408 ft - 734 m (Marilyn) Garnedd Goch: 2,300 ft - 701 m (Nuttall) Mynydd Graig Goch: 2,000 ft - 610 m (Hewitt)

On the north side of the valley is the well known Mynydd Mawr (also known as Elephant mountain from viewing it from the Caernarfon side as it resembles an Indian elephant), which trickles down to the Cilgwyn and then gently down to the valley floor; a walking route follows the path down to the valley floor.

The pass through the mountains at the eastern end of the valley is known as Drws-y-Coed (the door of the trees) and was a path that reputedly was hewn by Edward I's men after the conquest. In this part of the valley are numerous old copper mining shafts and old industrial linked buildings. There is also a memorial to a chapel that was demolished when a large boulder rolled down the mountainside and crashed into it.

At the top of the valley is Llyn y Dywarchen where Giraldus Cambrensis in 1191 told of the lake ‘having a floating island in it which is driven from one side to the other by the force of the wind’. His explanation at that time was perfectly rational: ‘A part of the bank naturally bound together by the roots of willows and other shrubs may have broken off and being continually agitated by the winds....it cannot reunite itself firmly with the banks.’

The astronomer and scientist Edmund Halley swam out to the island in 1698 to verify that it did indeed float.

Thomas Pennant in 1784 claimed to have seen the island and confirmed that cattle which strayed upon it when it was near the shore were occasionally marooned when it began to move.

The lake is now used for fishing and the car park there is on the site of a former clandestine Moravian lodging and chapel — one of only about 40 to have been built in the UK and therefore extremely rare, before being demolished; it was established in the 18th century (1704-1760s) and one of the forerunners of Methodism.

== Tourism ==
A report by Gwynedd County Council in 2006 profiled the tourist industry in the Nantlle Valley and made recommendations for the future.

The report lists the following tourist-based business in the valley:

"25 tourist businesses were identified in the Nantlle Valley, 23 of these took part in the survey. Of these 25 there were 7 caravan / camping sites, 4 hotels, 3 guesthouses or B&B, 3 attractions, 3 educational centres, 2 public houses (who have tourist accommodation), 2 specialist retailers and 1 holiday cottage provider. The 23 establishments questioned have 67 full-time employees and 105-part time1. Hotels are the main full-time employers (19 posts), but it is the caravan sites that are the main full and part-time employers (35 posts)."

Although the valley has plenty of natural resources – hiking, fishing, industrial heritage, the Glynllifon grounds and a long sandy and safe bathing beach at Dinas Dinlle – the infrastructure to support and develop tourism is not as well developed as other areas. The report makes recommendations for future development in the area.

Some of the already developed attractions are the Glynllifon Estate grounds and the aircraft museum and airport at Dinas Dinlle. An "unofficial" but popular attraction is the old disused Dorothea quarry — the old quarry has flooded now and attracts large numbers of divers to it. When the quarry flooded the 'galleries' and all the tackle and machinery that were on them were still present which makes diving there particularly dangerous. The unregulated nature and depth of the site has encouraged some divers to overestimate their capabilities – in the decade 1994–2004 21 divers lost their lives in the quarry. It has also been the site of unofficial raves in the past.

== Sport ==
The Nantlle Valley is predominantly a football-playing region and a number of football clubs have been founded in the area over the years.

The most prominent is Nantlle Vale FC which was established in the early part of the 20th century and is still playing, based at Pen-y-groes.

Talysarn Celts FC is based at Tal-y-sarn, a team in Llanllyfni and Mountain Rangers in Rhosgadfan.

== Settlements ==
- Aberdesach
- Carmel
- Clynnog Fawr
- Dinas
- Dinas Dinlle
- Drws y Coed
- Gyrn Goch
- Llandwrog
- Llanllyfni
- Nantlle
- Nasareth
- Nebo
- Pant Glas
- Penygroes
- Pontllyfni
- Rhosgadfan
- Rhostryfan
- Rhyd Ddu
- Talysarn
- Tanrallt
- Y Cilgwyn
- Y Fron
- Y Groeslon

Significant quarries include:

- Cilgwyn quarry
- Dorothea Quarry
- Galltyfedw Quarry
- Nantlle Vale quarry
- Pen-y-Bryn quarry
- Pen-yr-Orsedd Quarry
- Talysarn Quarry
- Twll Coed Quarry

== See also ==
- Nantlle Ridge
- Llyn Nantlle Uchaf
