= Silver Star Holidays =

Welsh coach operating company

- Founded: 1918
- Headquarters: Llandudno
- Service area: Gwynedd
- Service type: Bus; coach
- Depots: Llandudno; Caernarfon (until 2014)

Silver Star Holidays is a coach operating company based in Caernarfon, Gwynedd, Wales. Founded in 1918, its primary operation is coach holiday tours. Local bus services in Gwynedd were run by Silver Star until November 2010, when they were sold to Express Motors. Silver Star also trades under the Welsh name Seren Arian, with offices is both Caernarfon and Wrexham. The company entered administration on 6 October 2011 and ceased operation, but resumed services under new management later in the same month. It is now owned by Alpine Travel of Llandudno.

== History ==
Silver Star was established in 1918. It was initially managed by Edward Thomas, who was succeeded by his son Elfyn. The company began operation on a single-vehicle route linking Rhosgadfan and Caernarfon, expanding onto other routes and coach hire work after World War II.

The local bus operations of Express Motors were taken over by Silver Star in 1970. Following bus deregulation in 1986 the company's established routes between Caernarfon and Y Fron faced competition from other operators, but the competing routes proved short-lived. A new competing route in the Nantlle Valley was introduced by Silver Star, and a Bws Gwynedd contract for several routes in Caernarfon was won in 1990.

In 2008 Silver Star was named Best Coach Tour Operator at the Coach Tourism Awards. The firm opened a new travel office in Wrexham in late 2008; this contributed to the company's ability to maintain its business levels through the recession in 2009 and 2010. In August 2009 a heritage tour operation branded as Snowdonia and Menai Strait Vintage Coach Tours was introduced, covering Anglesey, Snowdonia and the Welsh Highland Railway.

Negotiations to sell the company's four local bus routes to Express Motors began in 2010, with operation ending at the start of a new timetable on 1 November. This ended almost 90 years of continual local bus service operation by Silver Star. Four vehicles and several staff members transferred to Express Motors. There were no redundancies.

Silver Star ceased trading and entered administration on 6 October 2011, with the loss of twelve jobs. A statement by the company's managing director blamed the closure on increasing fuel prices and the effects of the Great Recession. The company's closure affected around 800 people who had booked holidays with the firm. Later in the same month it was announced that Silver Star was to be reformed and would resume operation under new ownership. Services resumed on 19 October 2011, with most of the company's former staff re-hired.

In August 2014 Alpine Travel purchased Silver Star Holidays in Caernarfon. The operation was later moved to Alpine Travel's Llandudno depot, with the Silver Star travel shop in Caernarfon closing in 2016.

== Promotion and sponsorship ==
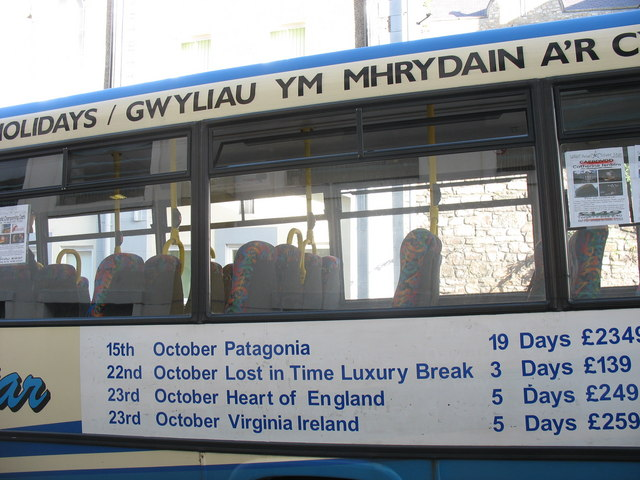
Advertising on a Silver Star minibus for the firm's 2006 coach tour programme

In September 2008 Silver Star announced a plan to plant 12,500 trees, one for each passenger carried by its coach holiday business during the summer of 2008, in schools and public land to reduce its carbon footprint.

Silver Star sponsor the Gwynedd Football League. The league was for part of 2007 styled as the Silver Star Holidays Gwynedd League.

== Fleet ==
Silver Star's coach fleet consists largely of coaches of various designs. The heritage operation used two vehicles new in the 1950s: an AEC Regal coach with 33 seats and 31-seat Leyland PS1 initially built for local bus service.

The bus fleet was more varied. Throughout the 1980s and 1990s Bristol vehicles were used, including RE and LH class single-deckers and a small number of Bristol VR double-deck buses. The award of a Bws Gwynedd contract in 1990 saw the purchase a new Dennis Dart by the company. Two AEC Reliances were also operated.

More recently, Mercedes-Benz minibuses were used on local routes.
