= Paul Davis =

Paul Davis may refer to:

== Arts ==
- Paul Marc Davis (born 1974), British actor
- Paul Brooks Davis (born 1938), American painter, illustrator, and graphic designer
- Paul Davis, British musician, keyboardist, co-founder of the band Happy Mondays
- Paul Davis (singer) (1948–2008), American singer-songwriter
- Paul Vincent Davis (puppeteer) (1935–2025), American puppeteer
- Paul Davis (potter) (born 1951), Australian ceramic artist
- Paul Davis, a character in the TV series Stargate SG-1

== Politics ==
- Paul Davis (Canadian politician) (born 1961), premier of Newfoundland and Labrador (2014–2015)
- Paul Davis (Kansas politician) (born 1972), American Democratic politician
- Paul Davis (Maine politician) (born 1947), American politician from Maine

== Science ==
- Paul Davis (programmer) (fl. 1990s), British programmer
- Paul K. Davis (historian) (born 1952), English historian
- Paul K. Davis (policy analyst), policy analyst at the Rand Corporation in Santa Monica, California

== Sports ==
- Paul Davis (cricketer) (born 1981), Australian cricketer
- Paul Davis (footballer, born 1961), English midfielder
- Paul Davis (footballer, born 1962), Jamaican forward
- Paul Davis (footballer, born 1968), English defender
- Paul Davis (basketball) (born 1984), American basketball player
- Paul Davis (fullback) (1925–1989), American football player
- Paul Davis (linebacker) (born 1958), American football player
- Paul E. Davis (1921–2009), American football coach
- Paul J. Davis (1881–1947), American football, basketball, and baseball coach, college athletics administrator
- Paul Davis (rugby league) (born 1971), Australian rugby league player
- Paul Davis (sailor) (born 1958), Norwegian sailor and Olympic medalist
- Paul Davis (baseball), pitching coach for the Seattle Mariners

== See also ==
- Paul Davies (disambiguation)
- Paul Davys (c. 1600–1672), Irish politician and civil servant
- Pahl Davis (1903–1946), American football player
