= Dafydd Llyfni =

Dafydd Llyfni was a 17th-century poet from Caernarfonshire in Wales.

Llyfni is known to have written a number of Cywydd style poems (including one written in petition to the men of Anglesey, and one in petition to the men of Llanllyfni). He also composed a 'carol of confession'.
