= Betws Garmon =

Hamlet in Gwynedd, Wales

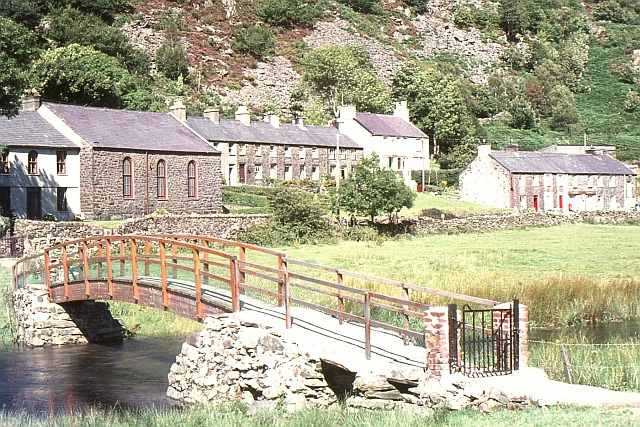
- Footbridge at Betws Garmon

- Location within Gwynedd
- Population: 249 (2011)
- OS grid reference: SH535575
- Community: Betws Garmon
- Principal area: Gwynedd
- Preserved county: Gwynedd
- Country: Wales
- Sovereign state: United Kingdom
- Post town: CAERNARFON
- Postcode district: LL54
- Dialling code: 01286
- Police: North Wales
- Fire: North Wales
- Ambulance: Welsh
- UK Parliament: Dwyfor Meirionnydd
- Senedd Cymru – Welsh Parliament: Gwynedd Maldwyn
- List of places UK Wales Gwynedd 53.095°N 4.188°W Map of the community

Betws Garmon is a community and small hamlet outside Waunfawr and near Beddgelert in Gwynedd, Wales. It has a population of 249.

The summit of Snowdon lies within the community boundaries. Bryn Gloch has the newly reopened narrow gauge Welsh Highland Railway passing alongside it. The hamlet of Rhyd-Ddu is in the community.

Over the road from Bryn Gloch there is a parish church. Along the mountain extensive slate workings can be seen.

Betws Garmon also has a park near it. Near the station there is a road which leads to Rhosgadfan. Up that road there is a footpath that leads to Y Fron. A river that flows through the hamlet is called Afon Gwyrfai.

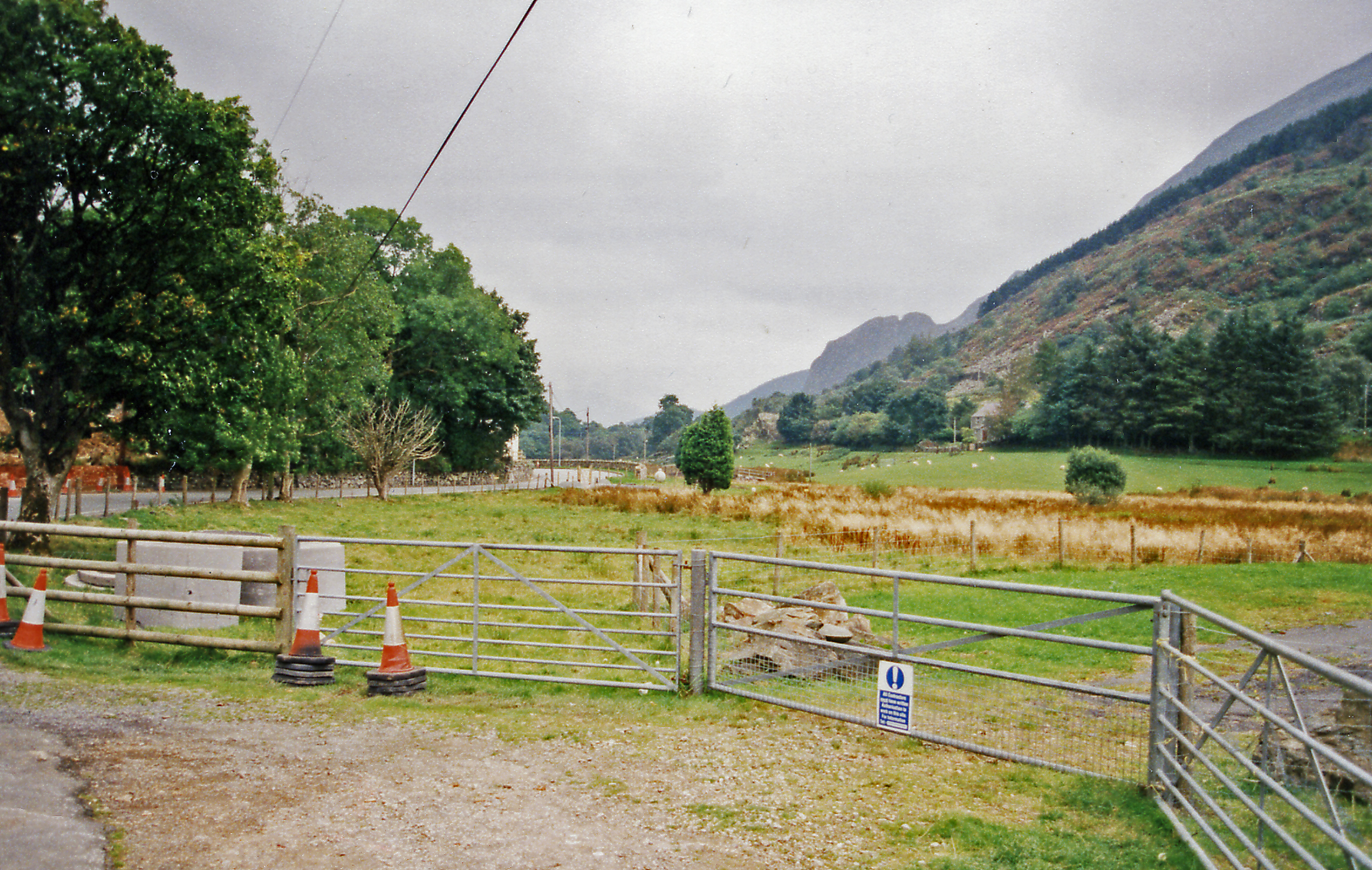
Site of Welsh Highland Railway station to be built at Betws Garmon, 1999

There was a folk tale concerning the family of Pellings, who lived at Betws Garmon until the 19th century. It was said that they were descended from a man and a fairy named Penelope. Penelope lived happily with her human husband until she was accidentally touched with a piece of iron, whereupon she disappeared forever.

== Etymology ==
The first part of the name of the village comes from the Middle English word bedhus, meaning "prayer house", which became betws in Welsh.

== Demographics ==
Betws Garmon's population was 249, according to the 2011 census; a 15.28% increase since the 216 people noted in 2001.

The 2011 census showed 54.8% of the population could speak Welsh, a rise from 45.0% in 2001.

Nearly half of the population was born in England.
