= Thomas Richards (historian) =

Welsh author and librarian (1878–1962)

Thomas Richards F.R.Hist.S (15 March 1878 – 24 June 1962) was a Welsh historian, author and librarian.

== Life and writings ==
Richards was born at Tal-y-bont, Cardiganshire, and was nicknamed "Doctor Tom". He studied history at the University College of North Wales (now Bangor University), before working as a history teacher at Tywyn, Bootle and, from 1912, Maesteg Secondary School, later returning to his old College as Librarian from 1926 to 1946.

Kate Roberts wrote Traed mewn cyffion (Feet in Chains), which reflected the hard life of a slate-quarrying family. The book was awarded a prize at the National Eisteddford in Neath in 1934 where Richards was the judge. Roberts won the prize jointly with Grace Wynne Griffith and her novel Creigiau Milgwyn. However it was alleged that Creigiau Milgwyn was unworthy of the prize according to the academic T. J. Morgan.

As well as his prize-winning studies of the history of nonconformity in Wales, he published two autobiographical works in Welsh, edited journals for the Welsh Baptist Historical Society and the Welsh Bibliographical Society, gave lectures and radio talks, and was a member of the Board of Celtic Studies.

== Works ==
- A History of the Puritan Movement in Wales (1639–1653), 1920
- Religious Developments in Wales (1654–1662), 1923
- Wales under the Penal Code 1662–1687, 1925
- Wales under The Indulgence (1672–1675), 1928

== Sources ==
- Owen, Gwilym Beynon (2001). "RICHARDS, THOMAS (1878–1962), librarian and historian". Dictionary of Welsh Biography. National Library of Wales.
- "Dr Thomas Richards papers". Archives Hub.
- Rees, D. Ben, ed. (2002). Vehicles of grace and hope : Welsh missionaries in India, 1800-1970. Pasadena: William Carey Library. p. 187. ISBN 978-0878085057.
