= Paul Davies (disambiguation) =

Paul Davies (born 1946) is a British physicist.

Paul Davies may also refer to:

== Art ==
- Paul Davies (art historian) (born 1955), British art historian
- Paul Davies (artist) (born 1979), Australian artist

== Law ==
- Paul L. Davies (born 1944), British legal scholar
- Paul S. Davies, British legal scholar

== Politics ==
- Paul Davies (Conservative politician) (born 1969), Welsh politician, Leader of the Opposition in the Senedd and former Leader of the Welsh Conservatives
- Paul Davies (Labour politician), British Labour MP for Colne Valley

== Sports ==
- Paul Davies (footballer, born 1952), Welsh footballer
- Paul Davies (footballer, born 1960), English footballer
- Paul Davies (wheelchair rugby), British wheelchair rugby player and manager
- Paul Davies (table tennis) (born 1966), Welsh table tennis player
- Paul Davies (snooker player) (born 1970), Welsh snooker player

== Other ==
- Paul Davies (Australian writer) (born 1949), Australian television script writer, novelist and playwright
- Paul B. Davies, British actor and writer
- Paul J. Davies, (born 1954), Canadian writer and designer
- Paul Davies (bishop) (born 1973), British Anglican priest, Bishop of Dorking
- Paul Stuart Davies (born 1982), British singer and songwriter

== See also ==
- Paul Davis (disambiguation)
