= Lloyds Coaches =

Welsh bus company

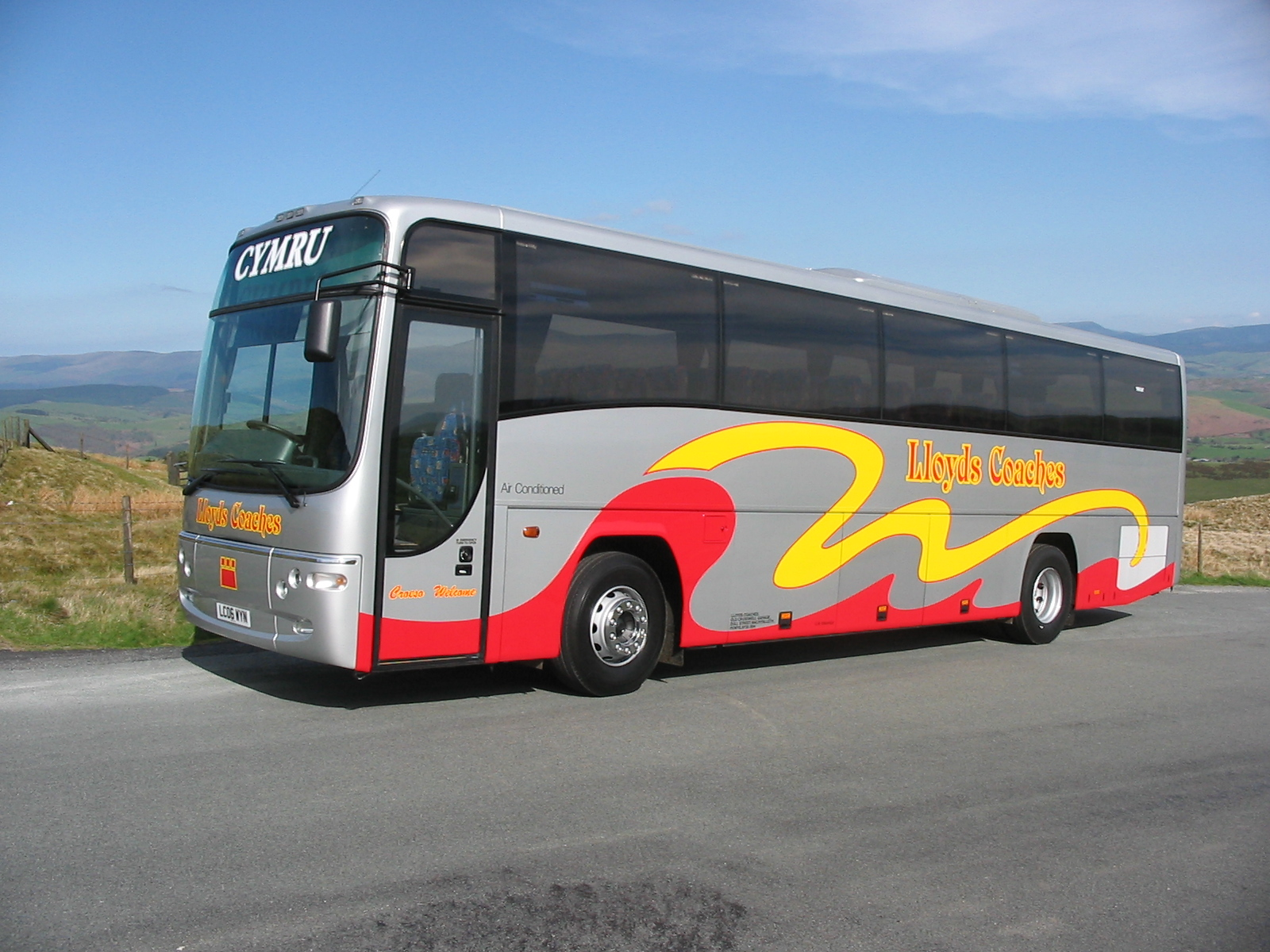
- Plaxton Paragon bodied Volvo B12B in May 2006
- Parent: Wyn Lloyd
- Founded: 2001
- Headquarters: Machynlleth
- Service area: Mid Wales
- Website: www.lloydscoaches.com

Lloyds Coaches operates bus and coach services in mid Wales. It is a small family-run independent firm. The company is based at the old Crosville bus depot opposite Machynlleth railway station. It was established in 2001.

== History ==
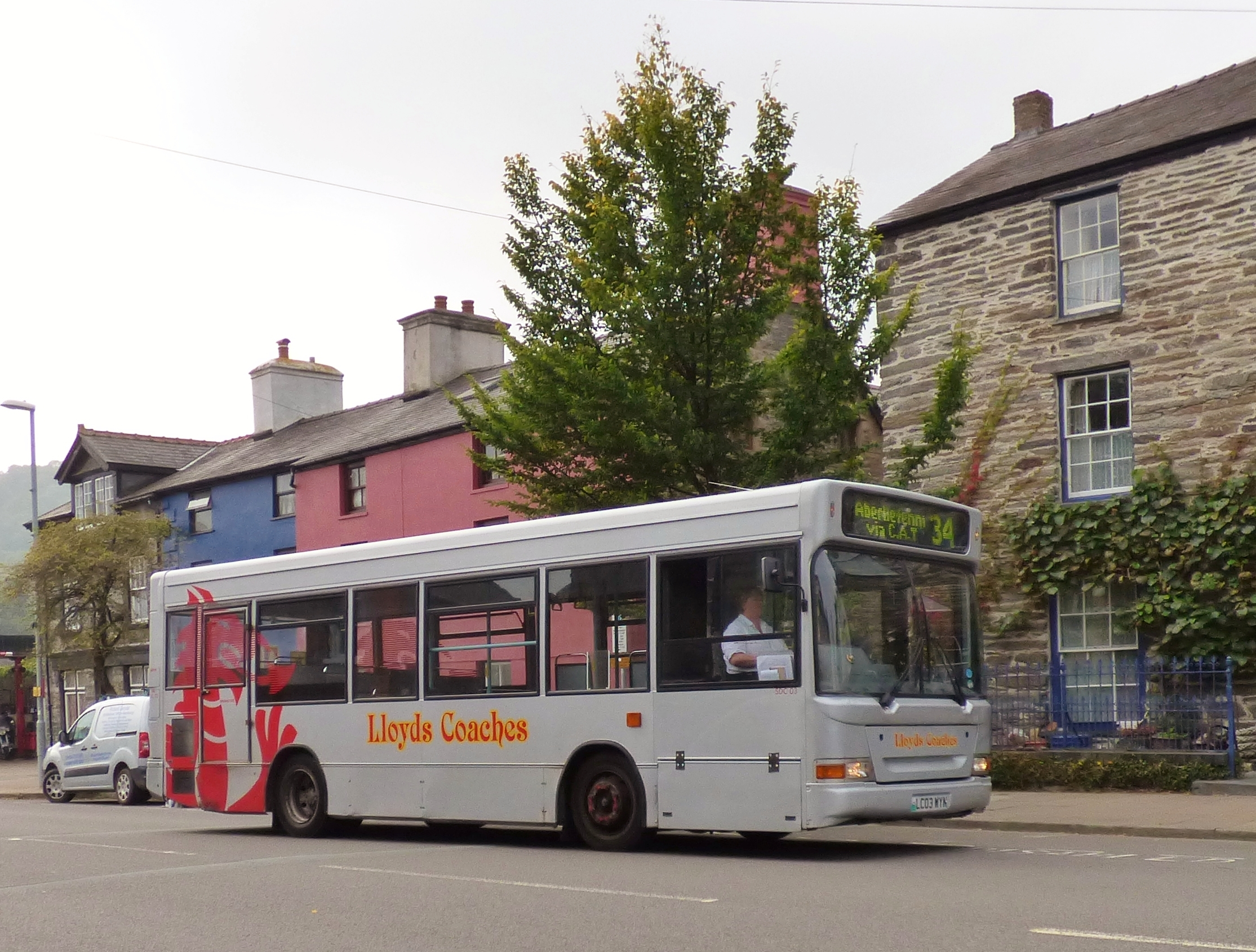
Plaxton Pointer 2 bodied Dennis Dart SLF in Machynlleth in September 2014

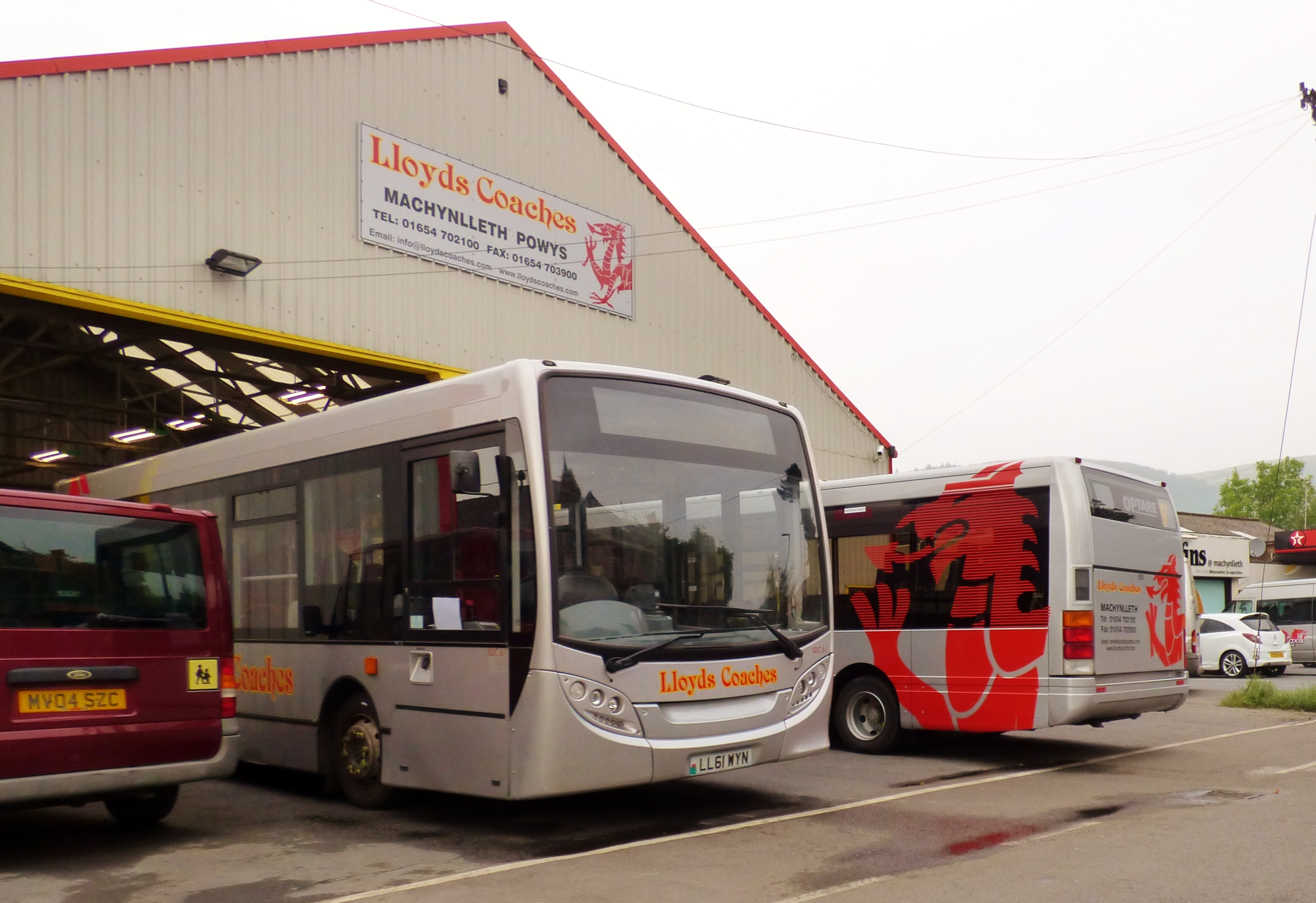
Enviro200 Dart and Optare Solo at the company's depot in September 2014

Lloyds Coaches was formed in 2001 by former Crosville Motor Services and Arriva Buses Wales employee Wyn Lloyd. The company began operations from a site in Machynlleth, and acquired the former Crosville Motor Services garage in 2002. The garage was briefly shared with Arriva Buses Wales before the larger company moved away from the site. A Powys County Council contracted route between Machynlleth and Dinas Mawddwy was awarded to the company, and private hire work was also operated. Six further routes were acquired in May 2004.

The company expanded gradually over the following few years. Coaching operations were increased with the purchase of new vehicles and the introduction of rail replacement work, first for Central Trains and later Arriva Trains Wales. Route 34, one of the six routes won in 2004, was improved with the introduction of a clockface timetable between Machynlleth and Aberllefenni, and is now run on a largely commercial basis.

In 2009 the company employed and introduced its first general manager, Richard Jones who had previously been Gwynedd Council's Senior Public Transport Officer. In turn he devised and implemented a strategic development plan.

In June 2010 an hourly route X28 between Machynlleth and Aberystwyth was launched with the intention of competing against Arriva Buses Wales, however the latter company withdrew its similar but shorter route 28 days before the commencement of the X28 service. In December 2010 the company's strategic plan gained pace with the introduction of a new two-hourly service numbered X29, linking Tywyn to Machynlleth and beyond to Aberystwyh through advertised bus connections with bus route X28.

The company gained further pace with their expansion process and soon acquired the majority of services in the Dolgellau area as well as the 28 service previously operated by Arriva Buses Wales along the coast between Dolgellau and Tywyn.

On 5 September 2011 the X28 and the X29 services were rebranded as the Coastliner services operating under the brand name of the Cambrian Coastliner Coast to Coast network which would market the travel opportunities now in place.

From April 2012 a new strategic bus network was unveiled by the company as a part of its continued strategic expansion in the area through the introduction of a new X27 service between Dolgellau and Machynlleth which would operate every two hours linking into the X28 Coastliner service and other services at Machynlleth. Service 522 was also renumbered X26 with services 34 and 34A re-timed for better connections at Machynlleth with other strategic services. Overall the new network introduced provided new travel opportunities across all services supported by a new commercial network day ticket introduced by the company including other ticketing incentives such as weekly tickets, and workers weekly tickets.

In an opportunity at developing multi modal transport opportunities for the area the company approached Arriva Trains Wales which operated the Cambrian Railway service. Through a collaborative approach both companies would jointly market the bus and rail services offered between Machynlleth and Aberystwyth as well as an agreement to fully accept each other's day return travel tickets on both bus and rail services. Operating on-demand services as well as the acquisition of the local taxi company allowed the company to offer multi modal travel opportunities to the area. The provision of affordable fares, the introduction of the company's Lloyds Day network ticket; workers weekly tickets on the Cambrian Coast to Coast services and a weekly ticket between Machynlleth and Aberystwyth further stimulated and incentivised public transport in the area the company operated.

On 24 September 2012 the company began operating on the T2 TrawsCymru service in conjunction with the Welsh Government as a replacement to the X32 service previously operated by Arriva Buses Wales. Their partner operator in this was Express Motors of Pen-y-groes and Blaenau Ffestiniog.

Richard Jones, the company's general manager left the company in 2014 to pursue other career opportunities.

In 2016, after the closure of GHA Coaches, Lloyds Coaches also began operating the T3 TrawsCymru service to Wrexham.

When Express Motors failed, at the beginning of 2018, Lloyds continued to run T2 between Bangor and Aberystwyth, and diverted the route slightly to take in previous parts of a route served by the Express Service 1 which had been discontinued (notably through Garndolbenmaen and Dolydd. Lloyds also increased the frequency to strengthen the Porthmadog–Caernarfon service on which they had become the only operator (apart from a few night-time contract services by Arriva).

== See also ==
- List of bus operators of the United Kingdom
