= Griffith W. Griffith =

Presbyterian minister

Griffith Wynne Griffith (4 February 1883 – 2 February 1967) was a Welsh Presbyterian minister, who became one of the leaders of the denomination. He was also editor of two journals, a member of the committee for a new translation of the Bible into Welsh and a member of the Council and Court of Governors of University College, Bangor. He also wrote and translated many hymns.

== Life ==
Griffith was born on 4 February 1883 in Brynteci, Llandyfrydog, Anglesey, the son of John Griffith (a farmer) and his wife Judith. He worked on the family farm until the age of 18, when he attended a school in Menai Bridge run by Cynffig Davies to prepare candidates for ordination. He was accepted for ordination by the Anglesey Presbytery in 1903. His education continued at University College, Bangor, where he graduated with a degree in philosophy) and then at the Theological College in Bala, for training in theology. He also spent some time at Jesus College, Oxford, from 1909. Griffith was ordained in 1911, and served in various locations thereafter: Bryn-du, Anglesey (1910–1913), Liverpool (1913–1923), Porthmadog (1923–1929) and Bangor (1929–1946). He was regarded as an "elegant and powerful preacher."

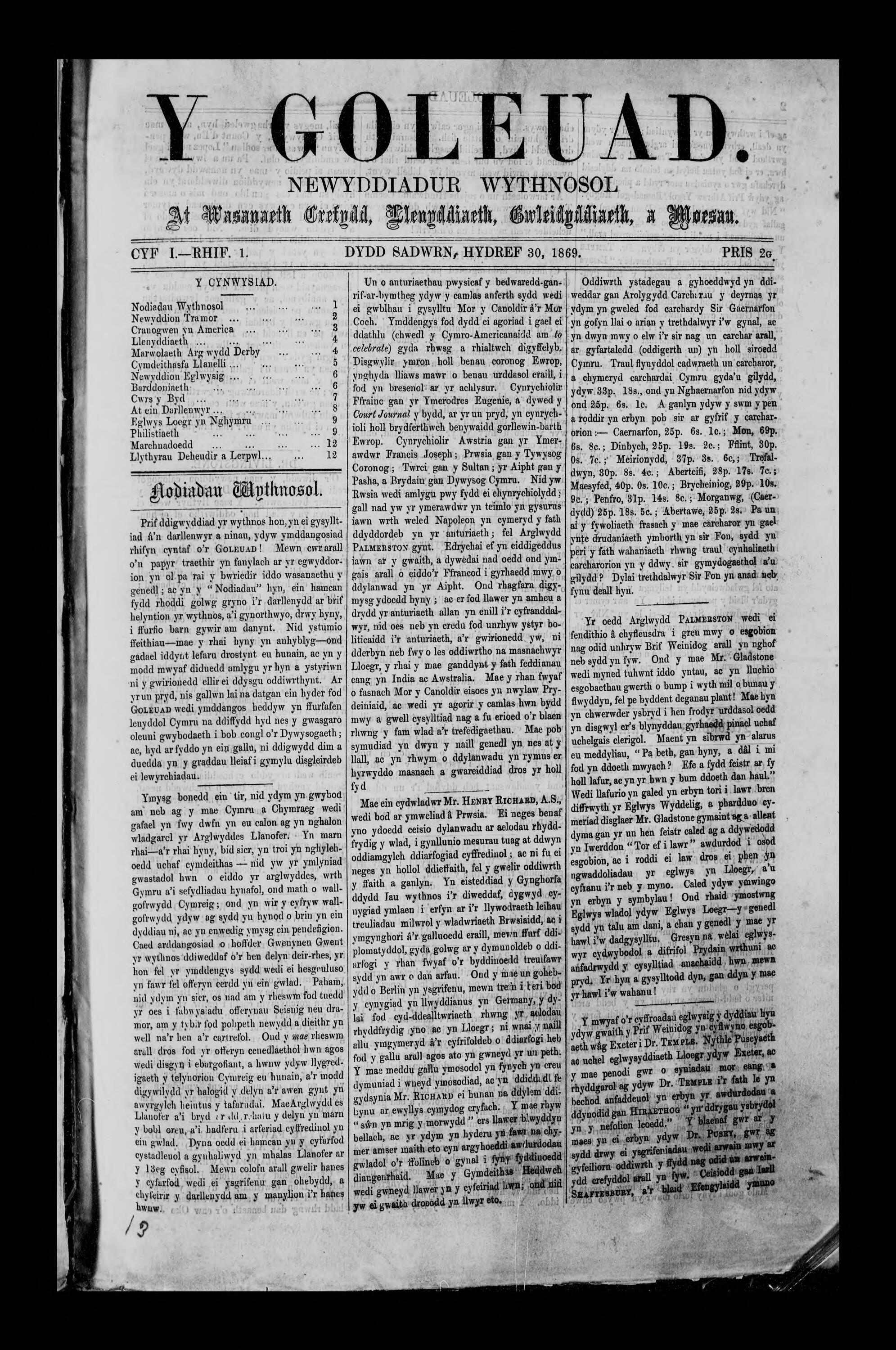
Front page of the earliest surviving copy of the Welsh newspaper Y Goleuad; 30 October 1869.

As well as his local ministry, Griffith was involved in the work of his denomination at a national level. In 1952, he was Moderator of the Association in the North, and was Moderator of the General Assembly in 1959. He was involved in the preparation of a Welsh-language "short confession of faith" and book of services, serving as secretary of the committee responsible. Griffith was also part of the committee that worked on a new Welsh translation of the Bible, and was a member of the Council and Court of Governors of University College, Bangor. His writings included Datblygiad a Datguddiad (1946, a version of his Davies Lecture of 1942), two novels (Helynt Coed y Gell (1928) and Helynt Ynys Gain (1939)), and a biography of the Welsh teacher and missionary Helen Rowlands (1961). He also wrote various theological books: Paul y cenhadwr (1925), Rhai o gymeriadau'r Hen Destament (1927), Y Groes (1943), The Wonderful Life (1941), and Ffynnon Bethlehem (1948). He also contributed to Y Geiriadur Beiblaidd (1926), and the Dictionary of Welsh Biography. He edited Y Cyfarwyddwr from 1929 to 1930, serving as assistant editor from 1931 to 1944. He was the editor of Y Goleuad from 1949 to 1957. Chapters from his autobiography appeared in this journal, and they were collected together as Cofio'r blynyddoedd in 1967.

After his retirement, he lived in Llanfair Pwllgwyngyll with his wife, Grace (née Roberts) whom he had married in 1914. They had two sons and a daughter, one of his sons (Huw Wynne Griffith) becoming a Presbyterian minister in Aberystwyth. During his retirement, Griffith wrote and translated a number of hymns, some being collected for publication under the title Odlau'r Efengyl in 1959. Griffith died in his son's home in Aberystwyth on 2 February 1967 and was buried in the chapel graveyard in Dwyran, Anglesey.
