= Grace Wynne Griffith =

Welsh novelist

- Born: Grace Roberts; February 1888; Newborough, Wales
- Died: 1 May 1963 (aged 75)
- Occupation(s): Nurse and novelist
- Known for: National Eisteddford Joint Winner in 1934
- Children: Three

Grace Wynne Griffith born Grace Roberts (February 1888 – 1 May 1963) was a Welsh novelist writing in Welsh. She won a joint prize at the National Eisteddford in 1934.

== Life ==
Griffith was born in Newborough in February 1888 and educated at Ysgol Syr Hugh Owen. She was a nurse in Liverpool. She wrote her novel Creigiau Milgwyn. The book was awarded a prize at the National Eisteddford in Neath in 1934. She won the prize jointly with Kate Roberts who had written Traed mewn cyffion (Feet in Chains), which reflected the hard life of a slate-quarrying family. However it was alleged that Griffith's novel Creigiau Milgwyn (Greyhound Rocks) was unworthy of the prize according to the academic T.J. Morgan. Morgan blamed the historian Thomas Richards who had been the judge.

The books for the 1934 Eisteddfod were required to establish a story over three generations, Griffith's novel was her first and possibly only novel and it involved a romance. The language has been considered anglicised by Kate Roberts biographer and it was three times longer that Roberts' work. I has been presumed that she shared the prize because the judge, Thomas Richards, wanted to encourage her.

However her "Creigiau Milgwyn" was to become a favourite of the leading Welsh novelist Manon Steffan Ros who said that it made “warm and safe every time” she read it. She read the book while in labour.

== Private life ==
She met the Rev. Griffith W. Griffith and they married in 1914. He was a noted biographer and they had three children including the biographer the Rev. Huw Wynne Griffith.
