= T. J. Morgan =

Welsh scholar

Thomas John Morgan (22 April 1907 – 9 December 1986), better known as T. J. Morgan, was a Welsh academic. He was Professor of Welsh at Swansea University from 1961 to 1975.

== Life ==
Morgan was born at "Ynys-y-mwn", in the village of Glais, near Swansea, and he studied Welsh at Swansea University. In 1926, he met his future wife, Huana Rees, at the National Eisteddfod of Wales. The couple wed in 1935. They had two sons: the politician Rhodri Morgan (1939–2017) and historian Prys Morgan (b. 1937).

Kate Roberts wrote Traed mewn cyffion (Feet in Chains) which was awarded a prize at the National Eisteddford in Neath in 1934. Roberts won the prize jointly with Grace Wynne Griffith and her novel Creigiau Milgwyn. However it was alleged that Creigiau Milgwyn was unworthy of the prize according to Morgan.

A Welsh speaker, he was not a nationalist and opposed Saunders Lewis. Y Treigladau a'u Cystrawen, published in 1952, is generally considered his most important academic work.

Morgan was Professor of Welsh at Swansea University from 1961 to 1975. He died suddenly at home in Bishopston, Gower, and was buried at Coed Gwilym cemetery in Swansea.

== Works ==
- Dal Llygoden Ac Ysgrifau Eraill (1937)
- Y Treigladau a’u Cystrawen ("The Mutations and their Syntax") (1952)
- Peasant Culture (1962)
- Amryw Flawd (1966)
- Dydd y Farn Ac Ysgrifau Eraill (1969)
- W.J. Gruffydd (1970)
- Hirfelyn Tesog (1971)
