= Llandyfrydog =

Village in Anglesey, Wales

Coordinates: 53.341642°N 4.338938°W

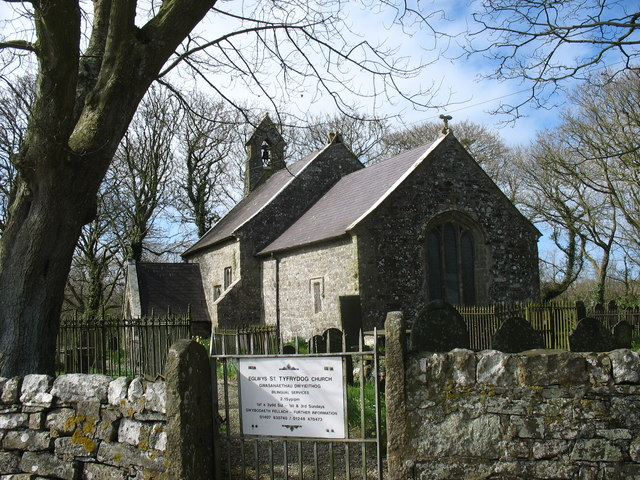

- Location within Anglesey
- Principal area: Anglesey
- Preserved county: Gwynedd
- Country: Wales
- Sovereign state: United Kingdom
- Police: North Wales
- Fire: North Wales
- Ambulance: Welsh
- UK Parliament: Ynys Môn
- Senedd Cymru – Welsh Parliament: Bangor Conwy Môn

Llandyfrydog is a village in Anglesey, in north-west Wales, in the community of Rhosybol. Until 1984 it was its own community.

== Landmarks ==
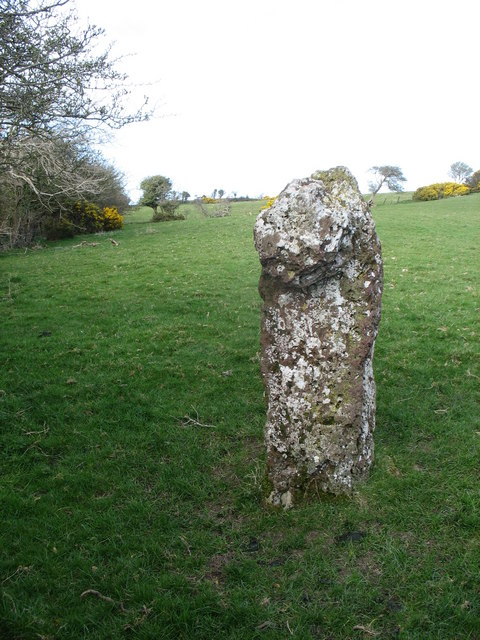
The stone in the field next to Lon Leidr

A standing stone exists in a nearby field, known as “Careg Lleidr.” According to legend, a thief stole a bible from a nearby church. As he ran away, unknown forces petrified him into stone as punishment. The stone itself looks like a human holding a sack over their back.

== Notable people ==
- Hugh Davies (1739–1821) a Welsh botanist and Anglican clergyman; his father was the rector of St Tyfrydog's Church, Llandyfrydog.
- Nicholas Owen (1752–1811) a Welsh Anglican priest and antiquarian.
- Griffith W. Griffith (1883–1967) a Welsh Presbyterian minister
