= Nebo, Gwynedd =

Coordinates: 53.030°N 4.269°W

Nebo
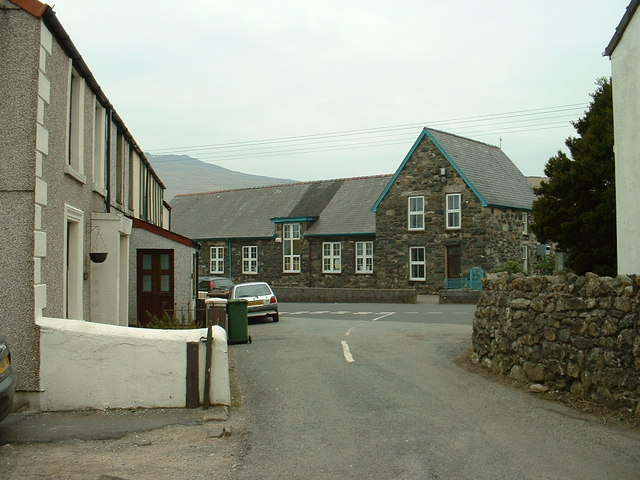
- The centre of the village, looking towards the primary school

- Location within Gwynedd
- OS grid reference: SH479505
- Community: Llanllyfni
- Principal area: Gwynedd
- Country: Wales
- Sovereign state: United Kingdom
- Post town: CAERNARFON
- Postcode district: LL54
- Dialling code: 01286
- Police: North Wales
- Fire: North Wales
- Ambulance: Welsh
- UK Parliament: Dwyfor Meirionnydd
- Senedd Cymru – Welsh Parliament: Arfon

Nebo is a small village in Gwynedd, Wales. It is adjacent to the small village of Nasareth and near the larger villages of Llanllyfni and Penygroes.

== Amenities ==
Nebo has a Welsh-medium primary school, Ysgol Gynradd Nebo. As of 2022, there were 15 children enrolled at the school, making it the fourth smallest school in Wales. In 2017, approximately 58% of pupils come from Welsh-speaking homes.

Nebo is now mainly a small residential area, as the chapel and post office have been sold in the last couple of decades. There is a play-area and a football pitch where school and community events are held.

== Broadcasting mast ==
The Arfon television broadcasting mast is on a nearby mountain and supplies most of the valley below, as well as a large part of Gwynedd. Erected in 1962, it is currently the highest structure in Wales since the addition of a new antenna in 2008 slightly extended it to 317 metres.

== In popular culture ==
The village is the primary setting of, and lends its name to, the Welsh-language post-apocalyptic fiction book Llyfr Glas Nebo, by Manon Steffan Ros.
