= Ysgol Bronyfoel =

Former school in Gwynedd, Wales

Coordinates: 53.069652°N 4.228277°W

Location
- Y Fron, Gwynedd, North Wales

Information
- Website: web.archive.org/web/20060211160144/http://www.bronyfoel.gwynedd.sch.uk:80/

Ysgol Bronyfoel was a Welsh daily co-educational primary school. The school was situated in the centre of the village Y Fron, Gwynedd, North Wales. It opened in 1844 and was greatly enlarged at the end of the 19th century. It was a vibrant and successful school for 171 years. The school suffered from declining numbers of pupils from 1990 onwards and was permanently closed in July 2015. Primary pupils now attend Ysgol Bro Llifon in the village of Groeslon 3 miles away.

The school building has been turned over to a village community group Canolfan Y Fron and it will open in May 2018 as a community centre, with a shop, cafe, community rooms and an 18-bed tourism accommodation unit. http://www.dailypost.co.uk/news/north-wales-news/ysgol-bronyfoel-fron-gwynedd-flats--12274729
