= Express Motors =

Welsh bus company

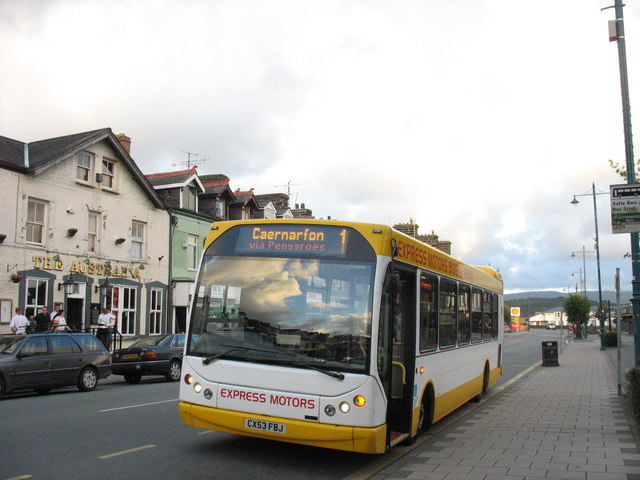
- East Lancs Myllennium bodied MAN 14.220 in Porthmadog in July 2007
- Parent: Eric Jones
- Founded: 1908
- Defunct: December 2017
- Headquarters: Penygroes
- Service area: Gwynedd
- Service type: Bus services
- Fleet: 40 (September 2012)
- Website: www.expressmotors.co.uk

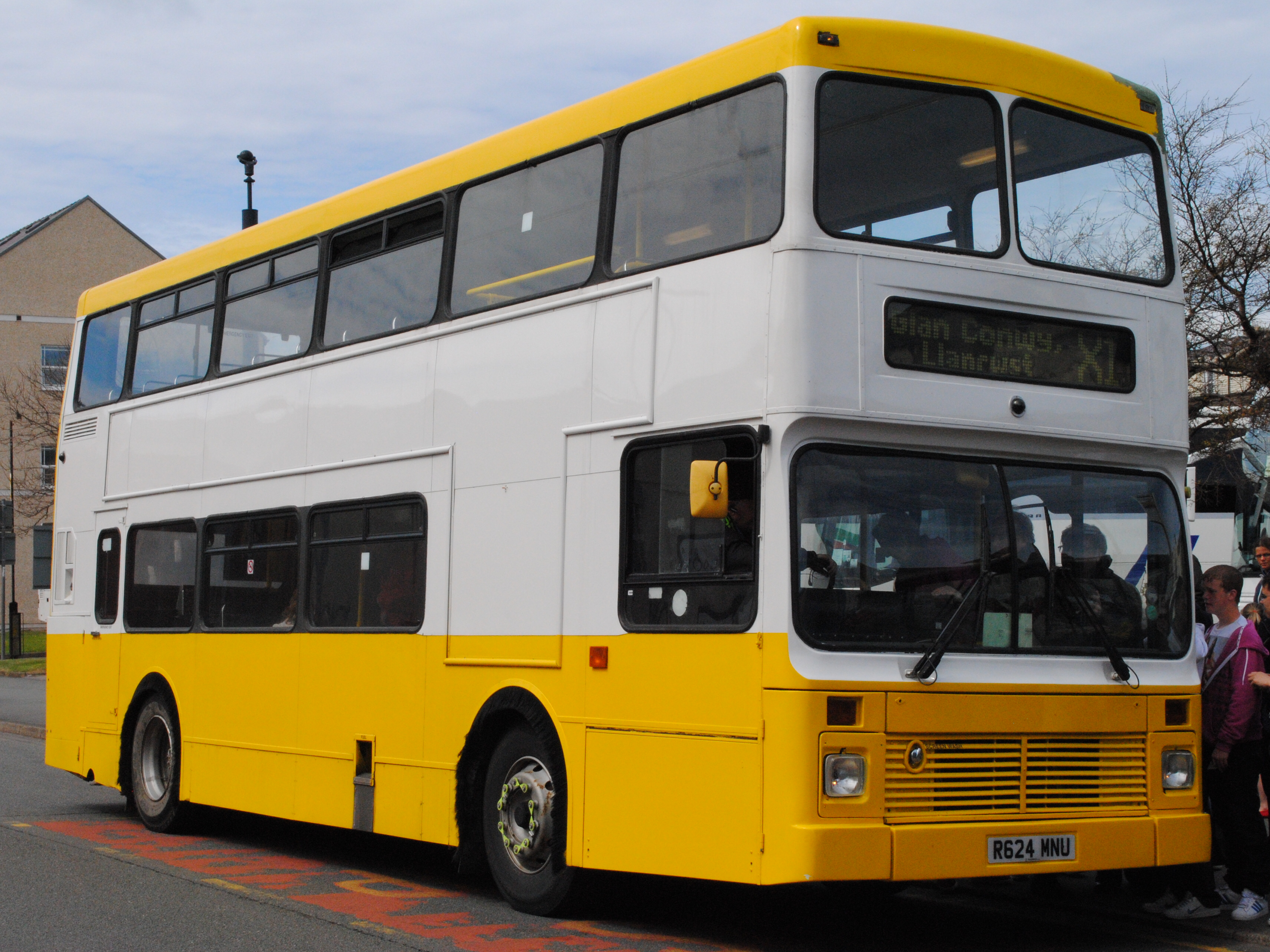
Northern Counties Palatine bodied Volvo Olympian in Llandudno in May 2013

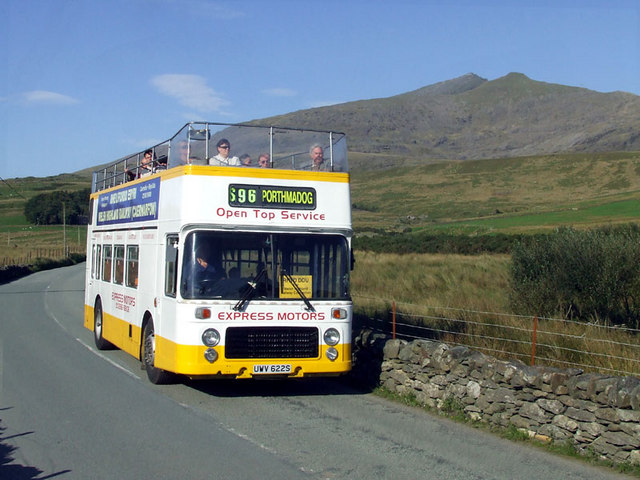
Open top ECW bodied Bristol VR at Rhyd Ddu in September 2006

Express Motors was a bus and coach hire company based in Penygroes, Gwynedd. The company operated public bus services in the Caernarfon, Porthmadog, Blaenau Ffestiniog, Bangor and Llandudno areas, as well as long-distance TrawsCambria service T2 between Bangor and Aberystwyth.

== History ==
Express Motors was established in 1908. It remained a family-owned business and was owned by Eric Jones. It operated a small number of local bus services alongside its main coach hire work until 1970, when the bus routes were sold to Silver Star.

With bus deregulation in October 1986, Express Motors re-entered the local service market. A local route in Caernarfon was introduced in competition with National Bus Company subsidiary Crosville Cymru May. Contracted work on route 1 (Caernarfon-Blaenau Ffestiniog) was won at the same time as part of the Bws Gwynedd network. The operations of Maldwyn Jones were acquired in 1989. A competing route between Caernarfon and Bangor was introduced in 1991 but withdrawn after four years.

In 2005 the company began a new route linking Llandudno and Blaenau Ffestiniog. Two years later the Welsh Assembly Government granted free rail travel to pensioners on the parallel Conwy Valley Line, causing passenger numbers on the route to be lower than expected.

The four bus services operated by Silver Star were taken over by Express Motors along with four buses in November 2010 in a move which reversed the events of 1970.

As at September 2012 Express Motors operated 25 buses and 15 coaches.

=== 2016 crash and licence revocation ===
In July 2016, an Express Motors coach carrying 42 children and 6 teachers from a Cheltenham School left the motorway after the driver fell asleep. The coach left the A39 Motorway in France near Lons-le-Saunier and the Swiss border. The bus overturned and came to a stop in a ditch, resulting in fifteen injuries, including one student who was airlifted to hospital with life-threatening injuries.

In August 2017, an investigation found that maintenance records had been falsified. The company's licence was revoked with effect from 31 December. Former Caernarfon, Bangor and Blaenau Ffestiniog routes were re-tendered and awarded to Arriva Buses Wales and South Gwynedd routes were awarded to Lloyds Coaches.

After the end of Express Motors operations, a submission for a new licence under the name Express Motors (Caernarfon) was submitted by former directors of the original company. It emerged during the enquiry that the original company had continued some of its operations into January 2018 without a licence. The submission was rejected in February 2018.

In October 2018 the owner, Eric Wyn Jones and his 3 sons also involved with the business, were jailed for fraudulently claiming over £500,000 for 88,000 journeys never taken. The sentences ranged from 6-7.5 years. The men had previously been arrested on suspicion of fraud.
