= Nantlle =

Coordinates: 53.056°N 4.225°W

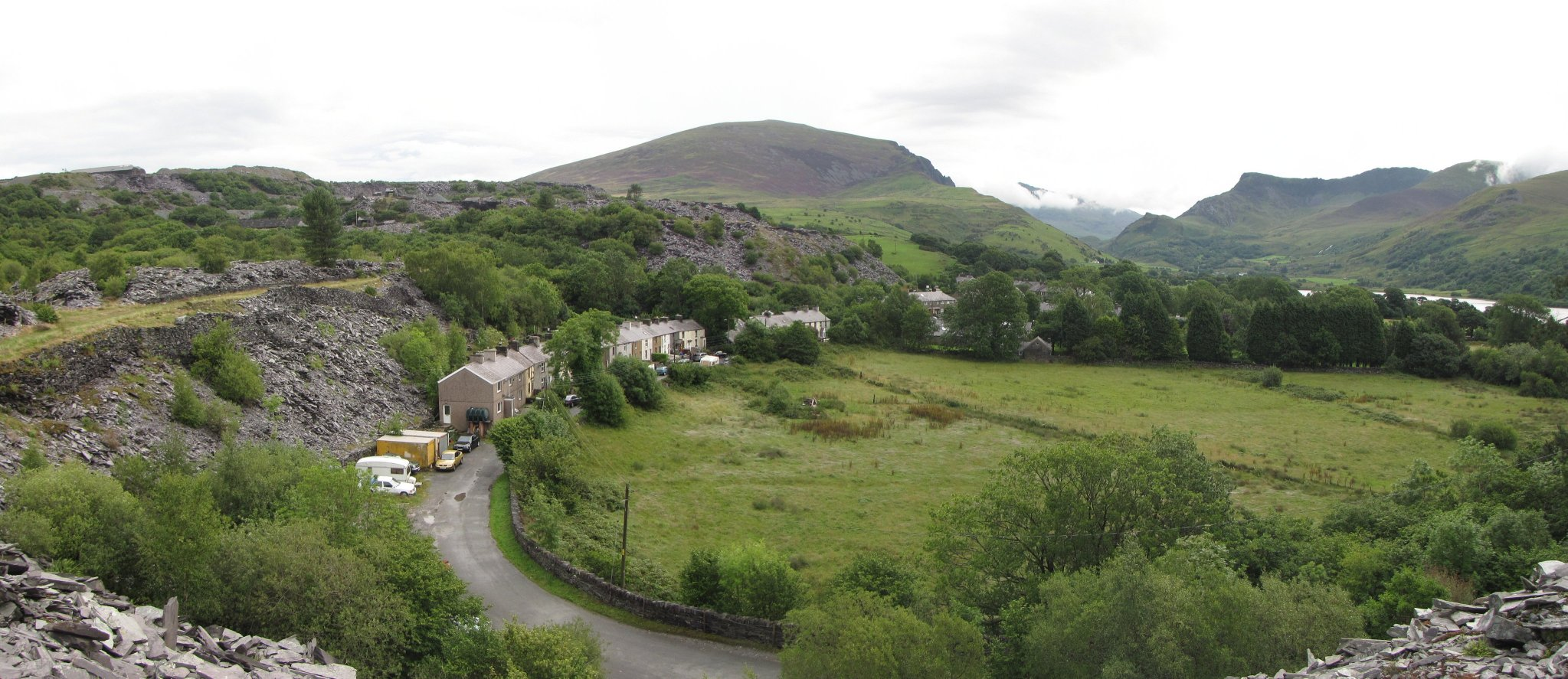
- Nantlle

- Location within Gwynedd
- Population: 228
- OS grid reference: SH509534
- Community: Llanllyfni
- Principal area: Gwynedd
- Country: Wales
- Sovereign state: United Kingdom
- Post town: CAERNARFON
- Postcode district: LL54
- Dialling code: 01286
- Police: North Wales
- Fire: North Wales
- Ambulance: Welsh
- UK Parliament: Dwyfor Meirionnydd
- Senedd Cymru – Welsh Parliament: Arfon

Nantlle (Welsh pronunciation) is a small village in the slate quarrying Nantlle Valley in Gwynedd, Wales. It lies on the north shore of Llyn Nantlle Uchaf and is part of the community of Llanllyfni. The population was 228 in 2011 with 42% born in England.

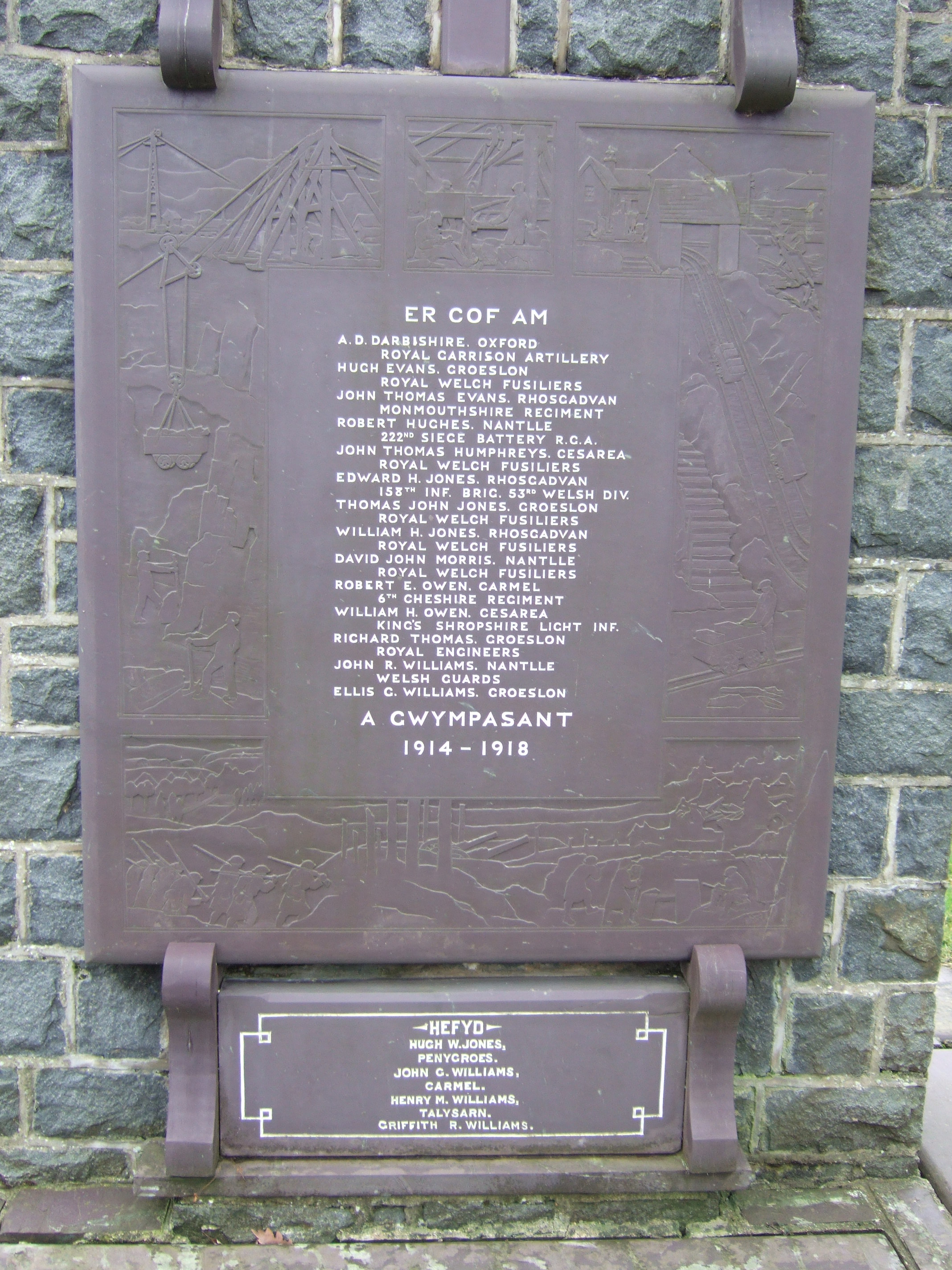
war memorial in village
