= Paul Davis (footballer, born 1968) =

English footballer

Personal information
- Full name: Paul Edward Davis
- Date of birth: 31 January 1968 (age 58)
- Place of birth: Newham, England
- Position: Defender

Senior career*
Years	Team	Apps	(Gls)
1985–1987	Queens Park Rangers	1	(0)
1987–1988	Aldershot	2	(0)
1987–1988	Wealdstone	12	(0)
- * Club domestic league appearances and goals

Paul Edward Davis (born 31 January 1968 in London Borough of Newham) is an English former professional footballer who played in the Football League, as a defender.
