= Paul Davis (potter) =

Australian ceramic artist

Paul Davis (born 3 June 1951) is an Australian ceramic artist and an Elected Member of the International Academy of Ceramics.

He creates large scale sculptural work as well as vessels associated with the Japanese tea ceremony, reflecting time he spent in Japan. His clay body Kagero marked the start of larger scale and more sculptural emphasis.

== Early life ==
He completed a Diploma of Art at RMIT Melbourne

== Career ==
Davis started teaching at the Caulfield Institute of Technology (now a campus of Monash University) in 1975 in 1973. He opened Arthurs Seat Pottery' at Red Hill, Victoria in 1978. He was associated with Monash University until 1996, achieving the position of head of ceramics there and completing a Master of Arts in 1995 with a thesis, "Glazes related to the Japanese Tea Ceremony". Davis received an M.A. from Monash in 1995 for his work on glazes associated with the tea ceremony.

In 1996, he was awarded the Japan Foundation Fellowship to study with 12th generation Hagi potter Saka Korazaemon, where he deepened his understanding of Japanese forming techniques, glazes and approaches to firing. He stayed six years, returning to Australia for three months each year to teach and work at his Sekizan Pottery School. Davis was brought into the Saka Koraizaemon pottery family dynasty in Hagi – the first foreigner invited to do so. He was accepted into the 12th generation studio established in 1402 and in 1997 awarded the professional name Yuho. From 2001 to 2009 he was head of Sturt Pottery at Mittagong, bringing new international influences to Sturt, synthesising his Australian and Japanese experiences.

In early 2009, Davis moved his studio practice to Islington, Newcastle, New South Wales. Since 2023 he has been working in Rutherglen, Victoria.

== Exhibitions ==
- May to June 2003: The Second Wave, Australian Contemporary Ceramics inspired by the Orient, Fo Guang Yuan Gallery, Melbourne, Victoria, Australia
- September 2010: Guest Presenter, First European Woodfire Conference, Brollin, Germany
- April to May 2022: Under the Influence, Sturt Gallery, NSW, Australia
- April to June 2024: Collaboration with Ito En and Minako Asai of MinnieSweets in "Tabled" presented by the Australian Ceramics Association at the Manly Art Gallery & Museum, Sydney, NSW, Australia.
- July to December 2025: 2025 Korea-Australia Invitational Ceramic Exhibition
- June to July 2026: [Un]Common Ground (Joint Exhibition with Jacqueline Clayton, Canberra Potters Society with opening remarks by Minister Yamaguchi of the Embassy of Japan, Canberra, ACT, Australia

== Artist in Residence ==
- El Camino College, Los Angeles
- University Southern Florida
- UCLA & UNLV
- 2002: Australian representative at World International Ceramics Conference, Foshan, China
- February 2005: British Columbia, Canada.
- May–July 2026: Canberra Potters, Australia.

== Collections ==
- Bendigo Art Gallery
- Major Public Collections in National and State Regional Galleries
- Corporate and private collections

== Citations ==
- Piepenberg, Robert, The Spirit of Ceramic Design, Pebble Press, 2008
- Cochrane, Grace, Smartworks, Powerhouse Museum, 2008;
- Messer, Barbara, Playing in their own backyard, Journal of Australian Ceramics, 2008.
