= Dinas Dinlle =

Hillfort in Gwynedd, Wales

- Location within Wales

General information
- Architectural style: Iron Age hillfort
- Location: Wales
- Coordinates: 53.086034°N 4.336252°W

Technical details
- Size: 150 m x 110m

Dinas Dinlle is a hillfort in Gwynedd, north-west Wales.

The cliff above the beach is known as Boncan Dinas and is occupied by an Iron Age hillfort, Dinas Dinlle itself. This fort has been eroded by the sea, such that only a double semi-circular rampart remains. Finds of Roman pottery suggest reoccupation in the 2nd or 3rd centuries CE. The fort is now (after centuries of erosion from the west) about 150 metres from north to south, 110 metres east to west, with an entrance on the south west.

Archaeological excavations at Dinas Dinlle in 2019 and 2022 found the remains of structures inside the hillfort. These included a stone-built roundhouse, 13 metres in diameter, with walls more than 2 metres thick, and threshold slabs of quarried slate. It is thought to be the largest roundhouse in Wales. The excavations also found Roman coins and pottery dating from around 200CE to 300CE. The survey with ground-penetrating radar found several round houses and yards connected to the entrance by cobbled roadways. The archaeological work was undertaken by the Gwynedd Archaeological Trust and the RCAHMW with funding from the EU 'CHERISH' project.

== The environs ==
Dinas Dinlle has a large sand and pebble beach with vast areas of sand from mid-tide level. The foreshore consists of natural pebble banks. The popular beach offers views towards the Llŷn Peninsula (Penrhyn Llŷn) and towards Ynys Llanddwyn (Llanddwyn Island) on Anglesey. The area is a designated Site of Special Scientific Interest (SSSI).

Erosion by the sea is a substantial problem. A groyne was built in 1994 to alleviate the problem; by 2013 it was thought to have made the situation worse. The height of the groyne was to be reduced and the large boulders removed. This was important to preserve the beach and the Wales Coast Path.

== Modern use ==
There is a small modern settlement immediately north of the hillfort, historically, part of Caernarfonshire. According to the 2011 Census, 77.9% of the population were Welsh speakers.

A small airport, Caernarfon Airport, is some 2 km to the north. During the Second World War this was an RAF base but now it is mainly used for flying lessons, pleasure flights, and the Air Ambulance. A caravan park is nearby.

== Gallery ==
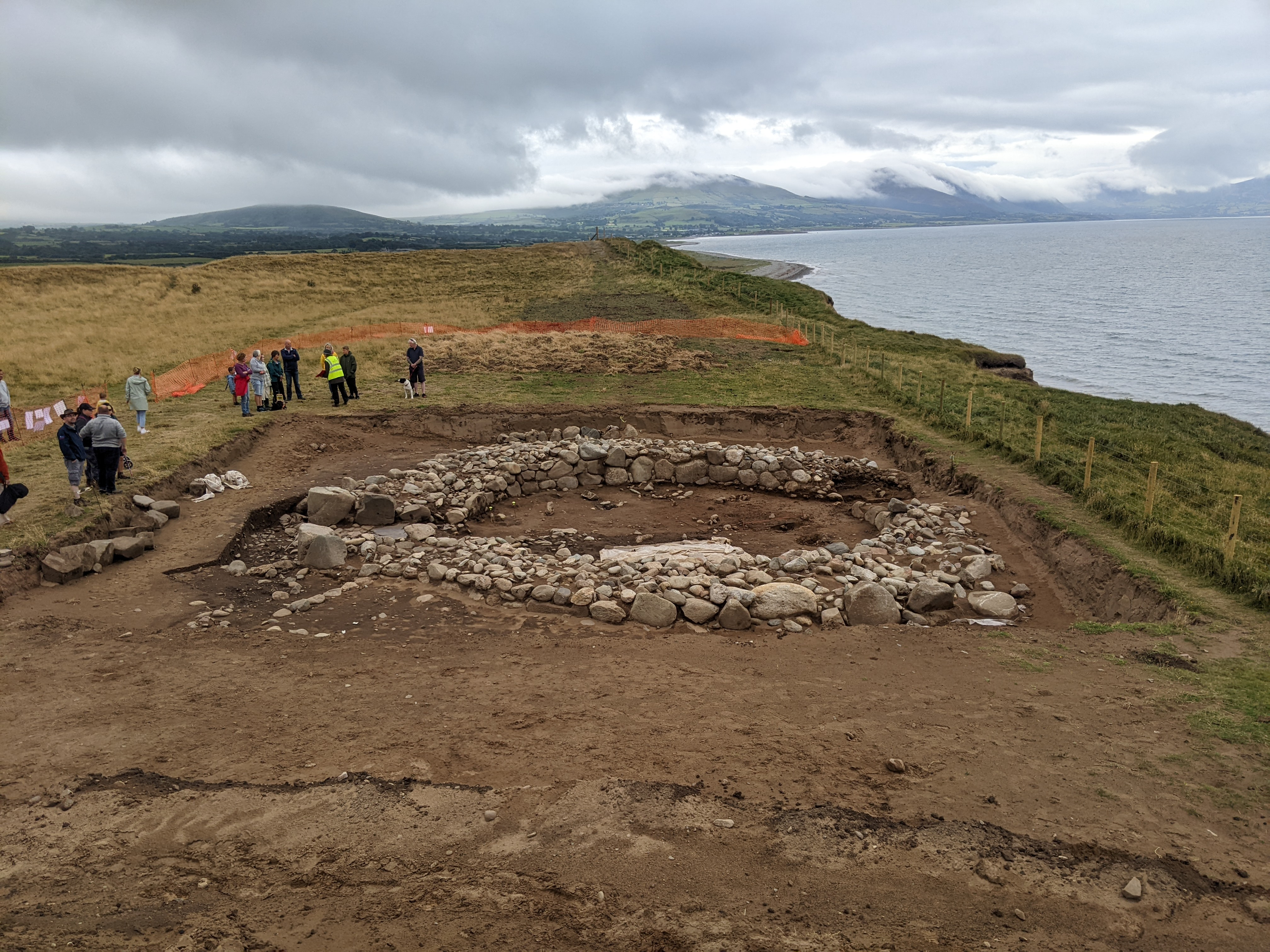
Dinas Dinlle, remains of a building excavated in 2022

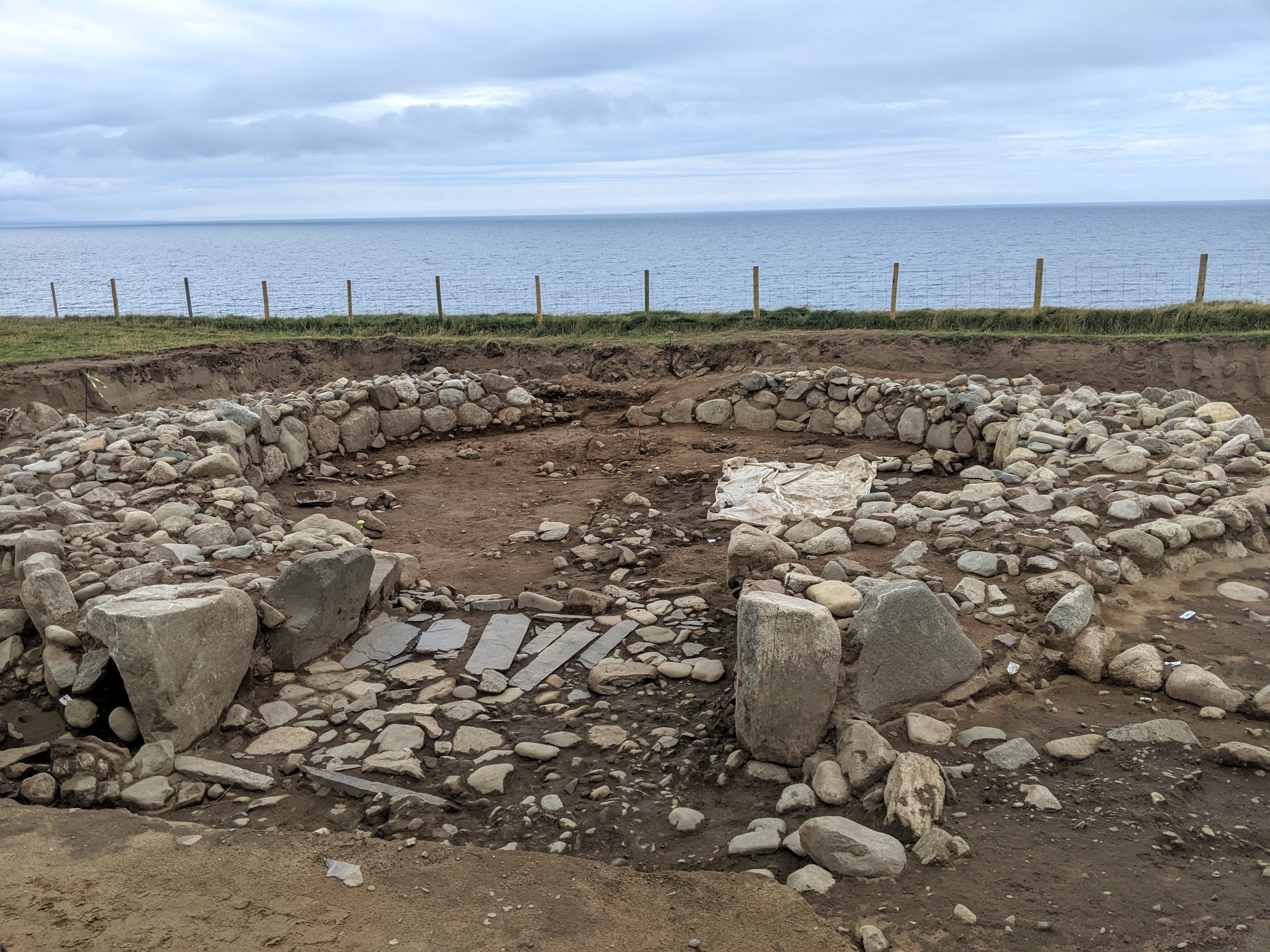
The excavated remains of the large roundhouse in Dinas Dinlle hillfort in 2022

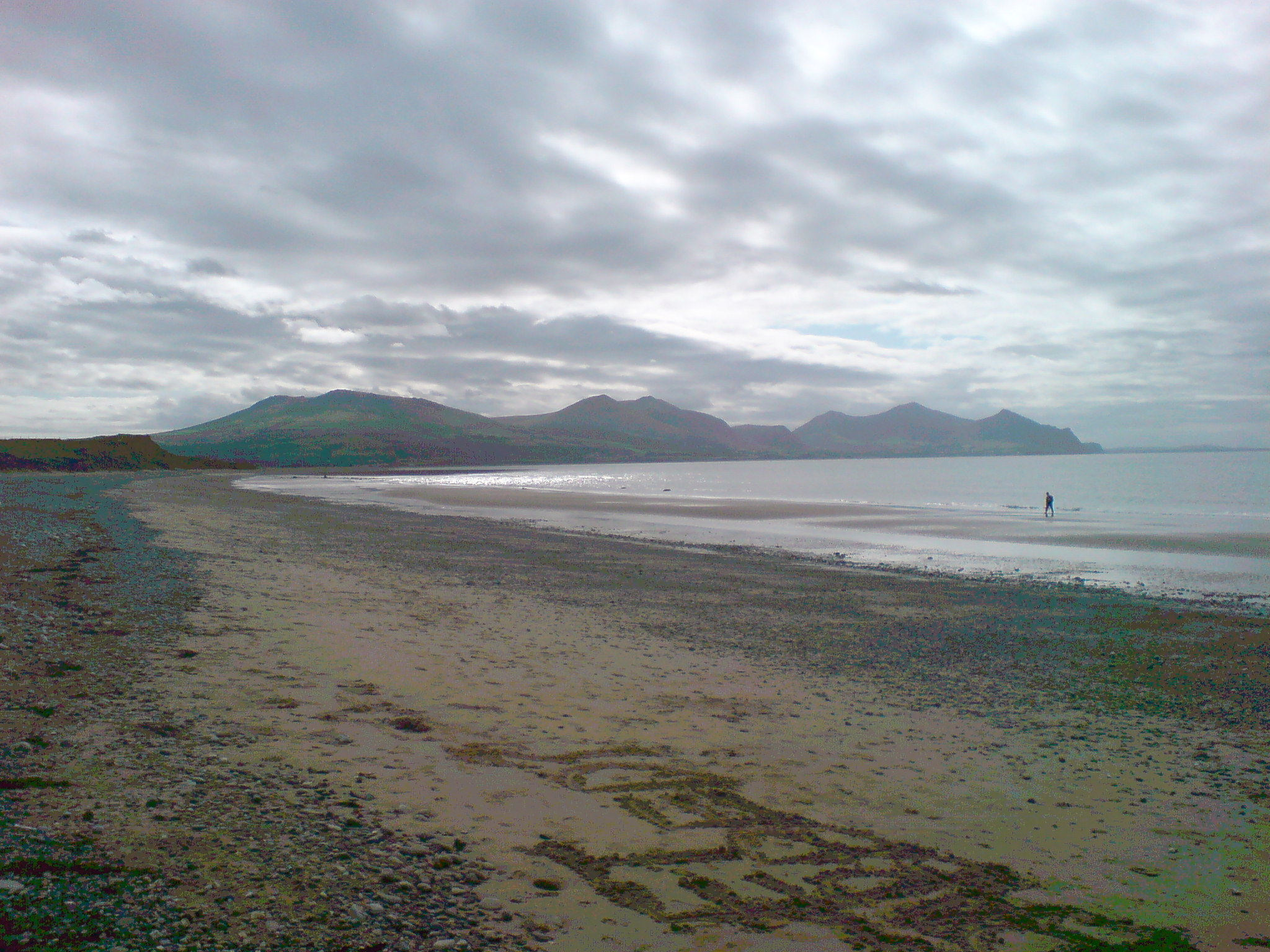

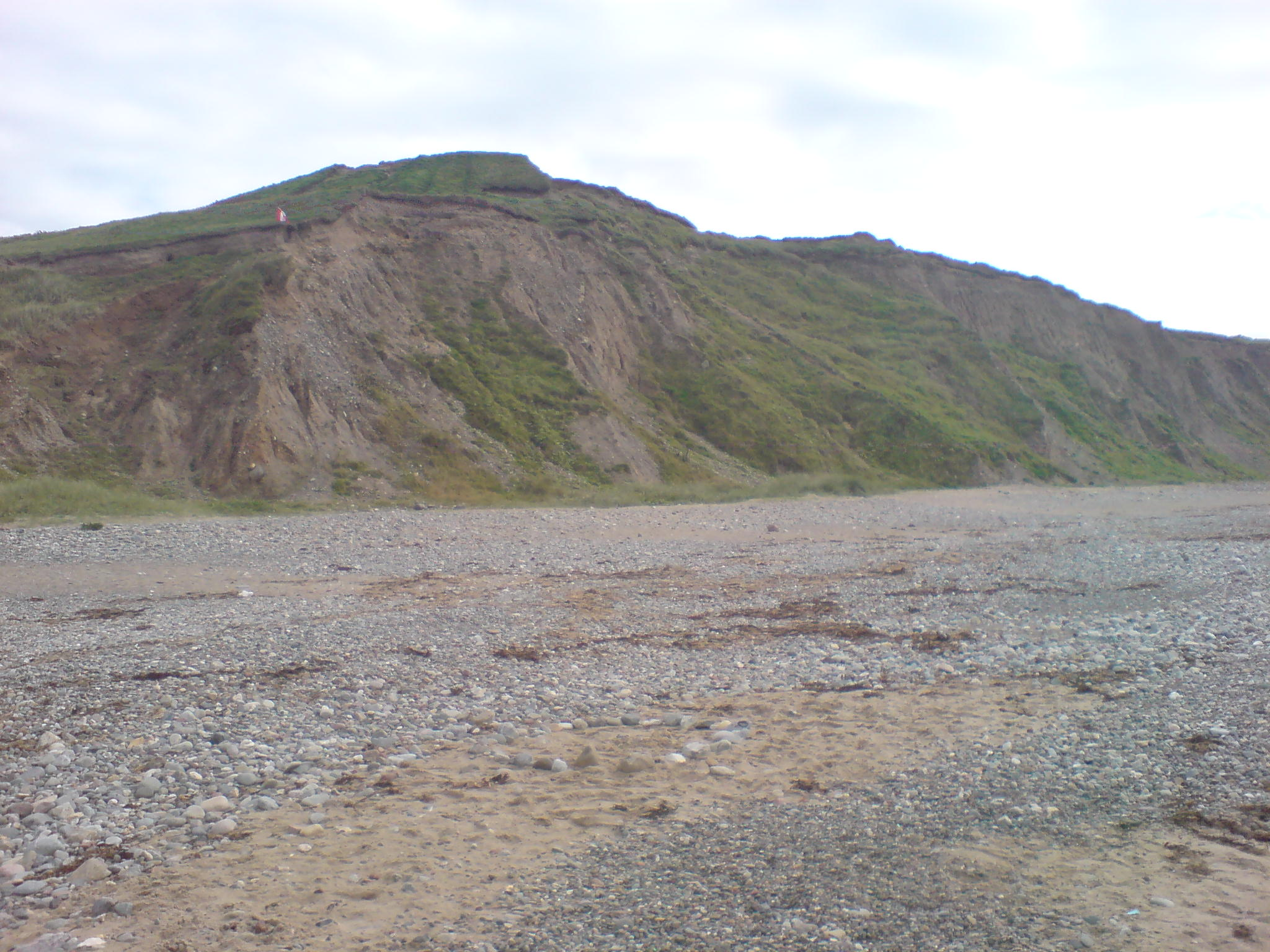

== See also ==
- List of hillforts in Wales
