= Rob McLennan =

Canadian writer, critic, and publisher (born 1970)

Rob McLennan (born 1970) is a Canadian writer, critic, and publisher. His name is specifically and purposefully stylized in lowercase letters.

== Career ==
mclennan is the author of two novels, and more than twenty books of poems, stories and essays published in Canada, the United States, England, Ireland, and Japan. He has been called "arguably his generation's finest practitioner" and his writing has garnered significant critical recognition, including the CAA / Air Canada Award as the "most-promising writer under 30 in Canada", the John Newlove Poetry Award, the Mid-Career Artist Award from the Ottawa Arts Council, and being twice long-listed for the CBC Poetry Prize, in 2012 and 2017. He is notable as an interviewer of other poets, with his "12-20 Questions" interviews appearing on his own blog, and in such publications as the Ploughshares journal.

mclennan's books have been published by Talonbooks, The Mercury Press, Black Moss Press, New Star Books, Insomniac Press, Broken Jaw Press, Stride, Salmon Publishing and others. His writing style is sometimes experimental and is noted for its use of humour and the element of surprise.

In his capacity as a publisher, mclennan operates above/ground press, a chapbook press that has operated since 1993 as an eclectic disseminator of new (and especially experimental) poetry within the North American poetry community.
