= Moel Tryfan =

Mountain in Snowdonia, Wales

- Location within Gwynedd

Highest point
- Elevation: 429 m (1,407 ft)
- Prominence: 103 m (338 ft)
- Parent peak: Mynydd Mawr
- Listing: HuMP
- Coordinates: 53°04′56″N 4°13′06″W

Geography
- Location: Gwynedd, Wales
- Parent range: Snowdonia
- OS grid: SH515562

Moel Tryfan (429 m / 1407 ft) is a small mountain near the villages of Rhosgadfan, Y Fron and Betws Garmon, in northern Gwynedd, Wales. The higher and more famous peak of Tryfan above Dyffryn Ogwen has also sometimes been referred to as "Moel Tryfan" in the past.

The mountain could be regarded as the westerly outlier of the larger Mynydd Mawr. The southern and eastern flanks of the mountain were heavily quarried in the past, particularly at Moel Tryfran quarry and Cilgwyn quarry.

Moel Tryfan is also the name of a hamlet below the western slopes.
