= Nasareth =

Coordinates: 53.026°N 4.279°W

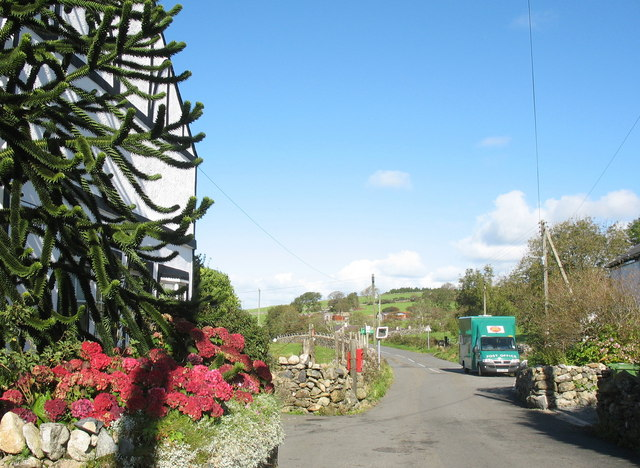
- Nasareth

- Location within Gwynedd
- OS grid reference: SH472501
- Community: Llanllyfni
- Principal area: Gwynedd
- Preserved county: Gwynedd
- Country: Wales
- Sovereign state: United Kingdom
- Post town: CAERNARFON
- Postcode district: LL54
- Dialling code: 01286
- Police: North Wales
- Fire: North Wales
- Ambulance: Welsh
- UK Parliament: Dwyfor Meirionnydd
- Senedd Cymru – Welsh Parliament: Arfon

Nasareth (named for the biblical Nazareth), is a hamlet in the Nantlle Valley in Gwynedd, Wales.

The Councillor for Nasareth is Owen Pennant Huws, which covers Llanllyfni and surrounding villages.

== See also ==
- Nazareth
- Bethlehem, Carmarthenshire
