= Paul J. Davies =

Canadian writer, book designer, publisher, and systems designer

Paul J. Davies (born 7 June, 1954, Vancouver B.C.) was employed in writing, commercial art, publishing, consulting, business management, and computer programming and application design in Canada for forty-eight years.

Since 1992, Davies published eleven creative fiction books with Canadian small presses and produced a library of Tibetan-language sadhana and prayer books with Riwoche Society.

== Career ==
=== Bookselling and craft publishing ===
Born in Vancouver, Davies came to Toronto in 1970 to study baroque music at The Royal Conservatory of Music. Taking an interest in typography, Davies studied book arts at night. In 1971 he founded Vathek Books, an antiquarian bookselling business; in 1973 the youngest person ever admitted to the International League of Antiquarian Booksellers.

Davies began a craft publishing enterprise, Basilike, in 1974 featuring the work of English authors active between the wars. A significant financial failure on account of youth and inexperience, Davies' publishing archive is now at the University of Alberta, and was the topic of a non-thesis Master of Library Science project in 1981. Davies was invited to write a memoir of this project which was published by Carleton University Press in 1987.

=== Technical writing for Frontier Hydrocarbon Exploration ===
After attending University of Toronto in mathematics 1979-81, Davies found employment in Calgary, Alberta, where for four years he was engaged as a research analyst and technical writer in frontier oil and gas. His major project was the data synthesis and writing of the Resource Management Plan for Lancaster Sound Region Hydrocarbon Development, a four-year, $1.2 million technical and environmental study under the direction of Dr. A.E. Pallister, O.C., in support of an application to drill an oil well offshore in the High Arctic. Davies spent several weeks in field work in North Baffin.

=== Type and art for trade book production ===
Returning to Toronto in 1985, Davies was retained for a joint government-industry undertaking to conceive and implement an automated system for typesetting for book publishers, successfully completed. Over the following twelve years Davies designed and/or produced more than 1,000 trade, scholarly, legal, and reference books operating as ECW Type & Art, also implementing a production system for legal looseleaf. Davies was awarded six Alcuin Society national design awards. As well, Davies taught at Ryerson Polytechnical University (now Toronto Metropolitan University) from September 1995 to June 1997 in computing methods for book publishing.

The books Davies designed and produced between 1985 and 1999 included fiction, poetry, scholarly, history, biography, art, travel, bibliography, reference, legal and legal looseleaf, and periodicals — for ECW Press, Butterworths Canada, House of Anansi Press, General Publishing and Stoddart Publishing, Véhicule Press, Quarry Press, York University, Dryden (Harcourt (publisher)), Bibliographical Society of Canada, Copp Clark Pitman, Moonstone Press, Octopus, McClelland & Stewart, University of Toronto, Aya Press, The Porcupine's Quill, Camden House, AMS Press, and others.

=== Creative writing ===
Starting to write creative fiction on mythic themes in 1991, Davies published eleven books with ECW Press, Vehicule Press, and Insomniac Press, Ontario and Quebec small presses, lastly with two reissue collections in 2020. Davies attended University of Toronto 1998-99 in Latin and English Grammar; did not continue and changed careers from book design and production on account of eye damage.

On 23 May 2024 Davies reflected on his creative writing on Instagram: "This will sound like The Goon Show 'Four Yorkshiremen' sketch ('Ohhh ... You were lucky! ... We used to live in an old water tank on a rubbish tip ...'), but which careers ... [were] much driven by a disarming, known psychological complex from childhood, old memory of the remote past I sometimes couldn't separate from present events, and in adolescence a shadow often shifting into persona I did not govern. Which gave me books to write later, but was a long time to full recovery." Events related to these effects are told in Davies' 1999 autobiographical novel The Truth. Comments and observations from critics and reviewers about Davies' fiction follow in Critical Reception below.

=== Controlled goods export security system ===
In 2000, Davies became project manager at a global trade systems manufacturer, where he created and developed online applications — in particular Visual Compliance, a compliance system for controlled goods export, which helps prevent bad agents from unlawfully purchasing defense trade or other sensitive items items for their purposes, a contribution to public safety and widely subscribed around the world. In 2013, Davies and a co-developer were awarded a U.S. Patent for a component technology, then a second U.S. Patent in 2017 for a security technology. Davies retired from this occupation in late 2019.

=== Tibetan language book production ===
In 2005, Davies put together a quality Tibetan-language typesetter, and over the following twelve years produced thirty-eight Sadhana practice texts and prayer books in Tibetan, English transliteration, and English translation, published by Riwoche Society [see below], edited and produced six books of commentary in English, and also made some large Tibetan and Tibetan-Sanskrit prayer flags.

=== Other projects ===
Other projects included Canadian Speedway Racing Association/CMA motorcycle racing 1976–79, overland trek through south-central Tibet 1991, created and maintained the Cornish language internet lexicon 1998–2009, created an online gallery of painted book illustrations by Sybil Tawse 2021, completed Duolingo Welsh 2023, with continuing Welsh study.

== Books published by Paul James Davies under the imprint of Basilike ==
- John Lehmann, The Reader at Night 1974. Poetry. 250 copies hand-printed and hand-bound, signed by the author. ISBN 0-920414-01-9
- Jack Lindsay, Faces & Places 1974. Poetry. 350 copies, hand-set. 75 copies signed by the author. ISBN 0-920414-02-6
- Roger Marx, J.-K. Huysmans 1974. Essay. 215 copies hand-printed and hand-sewn. ISBN 0-920414-03-3
- Lascelles Abercrombie, A Personal Note 1975. Essay. 125 copies hand-sewn. ISBN 0-920414-04-0
- Jeff Nuttall The Anatomy of My Father's Corpse 1975. Eulogy. 675 copies. ISBN 0-920414-05-7
- Jeff Nuttall, The House Party 1975. Novel. 215 copies, hand-bound in folding wraps. ISBN 0-920414-06-4
- Lascelles Abercrombie, A Tower in Italy 1976. Play. 175 copies, hand-printed and hand-sewn. ISBN 0-920414-07-1

== Fiction titles by Paul Davies ==
- Oblique Litanies: Nine Conversations and an Afterthought. Short stories. ECW Press, 1992. ISBN 978-1-55022-157-2
- Exactly 12¢ and other convictions. Memoir. ECW Press, 1994. ISBN 978-1-55022-230-2
- The Wreck of the Apollo. Short story. ECW Press, 1994. ISBN 978-1-55022-228-9
- Dropping the Chase: The Thirteen Enigmas of the Goddess annotated with Thirteen Stories and a Complaint. Short story. ECW Press, 1995. ISBN 978-1-55022-257-9
- Grace: A Story. Novella. ECW Press, 1996. ISBN 978-1-55022-275-3
- Gelignite Jack. Story suite. Véhicule Press, 1996. ISBN 978-1-55065-080-8
- Joe Ironstone: A Drama for Radio. Play. ECW Press, 1997. ISBN 978-1-55022-335-4
- A Dialogue for Five Voices. Dramatic dialogue. ECW Press, 1997. ISBN 978-1-55022-352-1
- The Truth. Novel. Insomniac Press, 1999. ISBN 978-1-895837-66-7
- Some Sunny Day. Novella. Insomniac Press, 2005. ISBN 978-1-894663-95-3
- You Can't Be Gone. Novel (reissue of Pig Iron, Vehicule, 1997 ISBN 978-1-55065-093-8), Basilike, 2020. ISBN 0-920414-08-8
- Dialogues and Conversations. Collected short fiction. Basilike, 2020. ISBN 978-0-920414-09-5

== Critical reception ==
Davies' fiction was generally well reviewed, a sample following. Davies read in the Harbourfront Reading Series, Harbourfront Centre, Toronto, 5 March 1997.

His May 1989 biographical profile in Quill & Quire began, "The term Renaissance Man is often applied to those who dabble in just two or three different fields. But what else can you call someone who's formally studied music, higher mathematics, and graphic design and worked as a typesetter, technical writer, music marketeer, oil and gas industry consultant, antiquarian bookseller, cartoonist, and even computer programmer?" In June 1999, Publishers Weekly wrote, "a well-traveled, much-published (nine books) Canadian writer, who has tried his hand at a bewildering number of careers."

Oblique Litanies: Nine Conversations and an Afterthought, a book of short short stories, was Davies first published fiction. In November 1992, Geist wrote, "Books like [Oblique Litanies] are rare, and we should have more of them. Davies is a tangential conversationalist, and these pieces have many angles." Canadian Book Review Annual 1993 said, "I nominate [Davies] for late night radio guru, he always writes with a whimsical, indeed, lovable voice."

Three books were published in 1994 and 1995. Exactly 12¢ and other convictions is about folklore in the 1960s hero comics. Paragraph for Fall 1995 remarked the book "deftly evokes the monumental significance of small things to children and youths, and the heady feeling of building an inner world within a newly discovered shared culture of like-minded people."

"For a seven-week period in 1991, Paul Davies and a group of fellow travelers journeyed through south-central Tibet. That trek was the inspiration for [Dropping the Chase: The Thirteen Enigmas of the Goddess annotated with Thirteen Stories and a Complaint] ... this beautifully produced book abounds with dry amiable humour." (Canadian Book Review Annual 1995). In Ottawa X Press Rob McLennan said, "straightforward and subtle ... [a] strange and compelling short travelogue."

Grace: A Story, published in 1996, is a fantasy detailing the progress of Xenophon's army through Armenia to Trabzon in Anabasis (Xenophon). In May 1996, Books in Canada called the novella "an engaging, interesting, and implausible combination of historical fiction, science fiction, and fantasy," saying "a real and particular mind and talent are at work in this book." The book had a college course adoption by Philip W. Leon, Professor of American Literature at The Citadel, Charleston, South Carolina, 1997-98.

Canadian poet and critic George Elliott Clarke published strongly unfavourable reviews for both Dropping the Chase and Grace: A Story in the Halifax, Nova Scotia Chronicle Herald after their respective publication.

Gelignite Jack, a story suite, was reviewed in several newspapers and magazines later in 1996. Quill & Quire said about the author, "Davies possesses a probing intelligence ... with insights and ideas," although found the narrative lacking. In the October 1996 Books in Canada, Canadian poet Judith Fitzgerald wrote, "[An] existential who-done-it stories that, in sum, carry Gelignite Jack's dominant narrative and collectively constitute one of the most ingenious compact pieces of detective fiction." Canadian Book Review Annual said, "This ingeniously structured book comprises three thematically linked stories .... Taken as a whole, the book is both an expression and celebration of storytelling and the endurance of the oral tradition. Readers who embrace Gelignite Jack on its own terms will be amply rewarded." In a short review, Montreal Mirror wrote, ""A journey from youthful dreams to adulthood and old age which gains power as it goes along." Rob McLennan wrote in Missing Jacket, "Davies ... has spent his time fine-tuning philosophy and personal observation, the small moments that pass by, unnoticed ... Certain to be a 'sleeper' hit."

Joe Ironstone is a short radio play about a Canadian hockey player who had a mysteriously short career, evoking "a more innocent time in the history of Canada's favourite sport ... well articulated in this terse and effective drama" (Canadian Book Review Annual 1998).

The Truth is an autobiographical novel. The review in Publishers Weekly June 1999 concluded, "Davies gives an ironic yet affectionate account of a nomadic, self-searching life. Readers will be left wondering what this New Age Renaissance man will come up with next." Canadian novelist Bill Gaston reviewed the book for The Globe and Mail saying, "The casual simplicity of style is an apt vehicle for a keen postmodern intelligence. This clean style and simply-rendered urban spirituality brings to mind Banana Yoshimoto's Kitchen of a few years back ... Truth is, this is one engaging, unique, yet utterly readable book. I'll buy the next installment of Davies's life, fiction or not." The Toronto Star published a generally unfavourable review for The Truth, much on the question of the truth of detail in the novel.

Christine Hamm wrote about Some Sunny Day in Online Magazine. "The title of this novella comes from 'We'll Meet Again,' a melancholy WWII song that promises that two lovers will reunite, even when both of them know that death is more likely ... The real beauty of this book is that the author is able to pull off the voices of so many different women (and a few men) of many different ages and make them sound believable ... a diary of many lives, nearly all of them fascinating and well-worth at least one read, if not two."

About Some Sunny Day, Professor Emeritus R. Gordon Moyles wrote in Canadian Book Review Annual that "the stories (vignettes? contemplations?) are quite enigmatic ... But they are riveting in their unexpectedness. Davies’s range of knowledge, from classical mythology to Buddhism to etymology, is staggering; his insights into the human condition (especially the death experience) are thought-provoking; and he writes with wit, grace, and ingenuity."

== Tibetan language texts ==
This project was undertaken between 2005 and 2017 to restore fragmented and poor quality sadhana and prayer texts, for the use of Riwoche Tibetan Buddhist Temple and available to members of its sangha and interested public.

Many of the texts were transcribed by Davies from Umê script, all composed in modern Tibetan Uchen and transliterated to Library of Congress standard, with thirty-eight books completed. Translations from Tibetan into English were created by various Khenpos, a degree for higher Buddhist studies given in Tibetan Buddhism. The books include:

- A Concise Recitation of the Preliminary Practices of the New Treasures of Dudjom [Ngondro]
- A Short Practice of Tara
- Medicine Buddha Sadhana [Sangye Menla]
- The Sadhana of Tröma Nagmo: The Sun of Primordial Wisdom [Chöd]
- Aspiration Prayers: The King of Noble Prayers Aspiring to the Deeds of the Excellent, Aspiration Prayer of Maitreya, Aspiration Prayer from "Undertaking The Conduct", The Great Perfection Aspiration Prayer of Samantabhadra, The Aspiration of the Vajradhatu Mandala Chokchu Düshi
- Liturgies for the Dakini Tsok
- Pema Sangthig: The Sadhana of Immortal Life from The Secret Essence of the Lotus
- Shower of Blessings: A Guru Yoga based on the Seven Line Prayer
- Sangye Won Sadhana and Tsok
- Chenrezig Meditation: For the Benefit of All Beings as Vast as the Skies
- Vajrakilaya Sadhana
- A Liturgy of the Buddha: The Blessing Treasure of Mipham
- The Lineage Supplication for Thigle Gyachen: The Most Secret Way to Accomplish the Guru
- Bardo Prayers
- Offering Prayers
- The Heart Sutra
- Mountain Sang Offering: The Cycle of the Heart Sadhana of the Knowledge Holders
