= Llanllyfni =

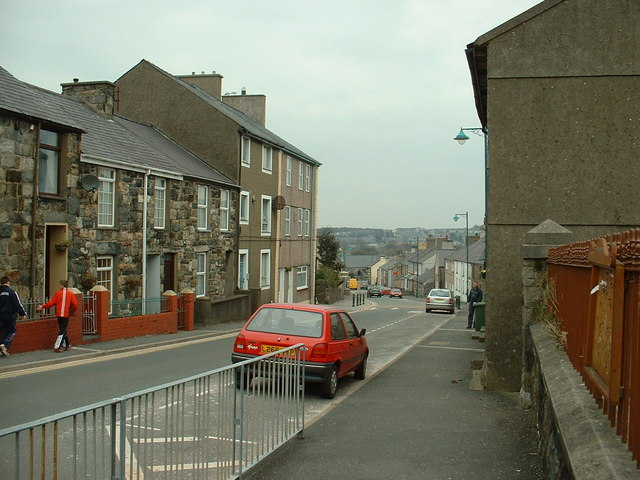
- Llanllyfni

- Location within Gwynedd
- Area: 42.76 km^{2} (16.51 sq mi)
- Population: 4,135 (2011)
  - Density: 97/km^{2} (250/sq mi)
- OS grid reference: SH475515
- Community: Llanllyfni
- Principal area: Gwynedd
- Preserved county: Gwynedd
- Country: Wales
- Sovereign state: United Kingdom
- Post town: CAERNARFON
- Postcode district: LL54
- Dialling code: 01286
- Police: North Wales
- Fire: North Wales
- Ambulance: Welsh
- UK Parliament: Dwyfor Meirionnydd
- Senedd Cymru – Welsh Parliament: Arfon
- List of places UK Wales Gwynedd 53.045°N 4.282°W Map of the community

Llanllyfni (Welsh pronunciation) is a village and a community in Gwynedd, Wales. It is in the historic county of Caernarfonshire. The community consists of the villages of Drws-y-coed, Nantlle, Nasareth, Nebo, Penygroes, Talysarn and the village of Llanllyfni itself. Penygroes, Llanllyfni and Talysarn are almost conjoined. As an electoral ward the 2011 census recorded a population of 1256. It is a largely Welsh-speaking village as 85% of the villagers speak Welsh as their first language. The community covers 43 square kilometres.

The river Llyfni (Afon Llyfnwy in Welsh) runs through the village. Llanllyfni existed before the slate quarries opened but grew bigger and bigger during the slate quarrying period. In the 2001 census, there were about 650 people living in the village of Llanllyfni.

Llanllyfni is seven miles away from Caernarfon. Nearby is the Nantlle Ridge range of mountains including Craig Cwm Silyn at 734 metres (2,408 feet).

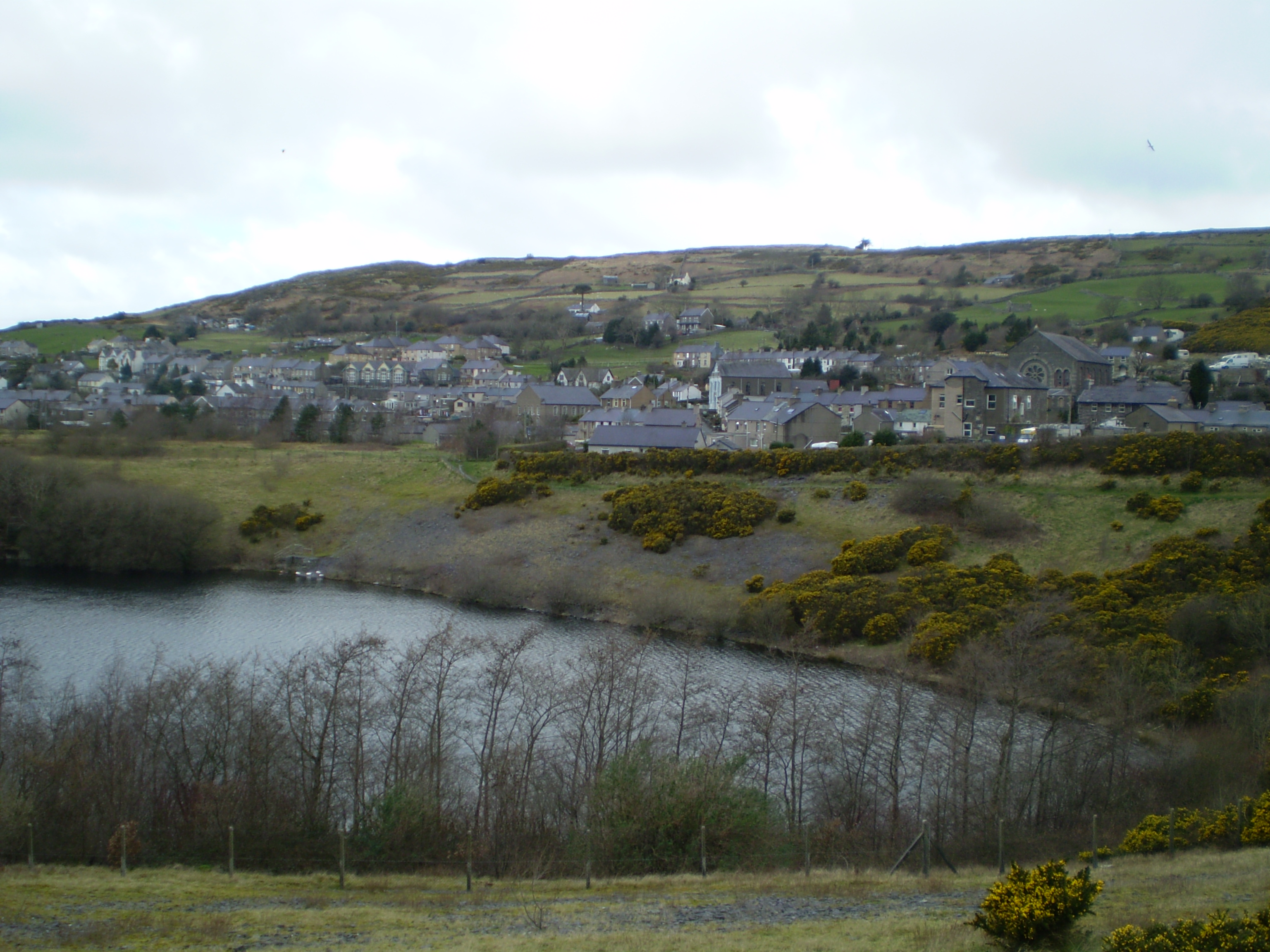
Talysarn village, part of the Community

== Amenities and buildings of note ==
Eglwys Sant Rhedyw (the parish church) has existed since as early as the 4th century. A traditional 'Plygain' (Welsh language service) is held every year on Christmas Day at 7 a.m. There are two other places of worship in the village: Capel Ebeneser, Felingerrig (Baptist) and Capel Moriah (formerly Salem) (Methodist). The original Capel Salem chapel was closed in the early 20th century, and replaced by the smaller Capel Moriah The larger Capel Salem was eventually demolished, except for the Sunday School building. To avoid confusion, the new Capel Moriah continued to be informally known as Capel Salem by the villagers. Only Capel Ebeneser and Eglwys Sant Rhedyw are still open; Capel Moriah/Salem has closed.

There are five cemeteries in Llanllyfni: Mynwent Eglwys Sant Rhedyw (the oldest), Mynwent Capel Ebeneser - Felingerrig, Mynwent Capel Salem, Mynwent Bara Caws (dating back to the early 18th century) and Mynwent Gorffwysfa (the newest).

Llanllyfni once had at least five public houses, two of which can be seen today though they have been turned into private dwellings. The King's Head was one of these. The last surviving pub, the Quarryman's Arms, closed after a fire and has since been demolished. It was immortalised in the popular song "Quarry (Man's Arms)" by singer Bryn Fôn.

There is one school in the village, Ysgol Gynradd Llanllyfni, a primary school. For secondary school, children have to travel less than a mile to Ysgol Dyffryn Nantlle in Penygroes. World-famous opera singer Bryn Terfel attended Ysgol Gynradd Llanllyfni.

A fair has been held in Llanllyfni on 6 July, St Rhedyw's Day, for at least 200 years and it is a tradition that still exists today.

The Neuadd Goffa (Memorial Hall) is the centre of village life with numerous events being held there throughout the year.

Llanllyfni is a proudly strong Welsh-speaking community. The Welsh language is central to village activities and events.

== Sport and leisure ==
As of 2005, a local football club was set up, C.P.D. Llanllyfni (Clwb Pel Droed Llanllyfni). The club, popular among many villagers, sprung their way up from the Caernarfon & District League to the Gwynedd League. It then went on to the very respectable Welsh Alliance League in no less than four seasons of playing football on the King George V playing field, situated in the middle of the village next door to the village's much used Memorial Hall.

== Notable residents ==
Many culturally important and well known figures within the Welsh society have sprung from Llanllyfni. Some of the well-known people that have emerged from Llanllyfni include 20th-century writer Mathonwy Hughes (20th-century writer), singer and actor Bryn Fôn, Ysgol Glanaethwy founder Cefin Roberts, and writer and actor Wynford Ellis Owen. In the 18th century Martha'r Mynydd convinced her neighbours in the village of the existence of invisible people.

== Governance ==
An electoral ward in the same name exists. This ward does not include some of the larger communities named above and the total population taken at the 2011 Census was 1,256 only.
