= Y Fron =

Coordinates: 53.069°N 4.229°W

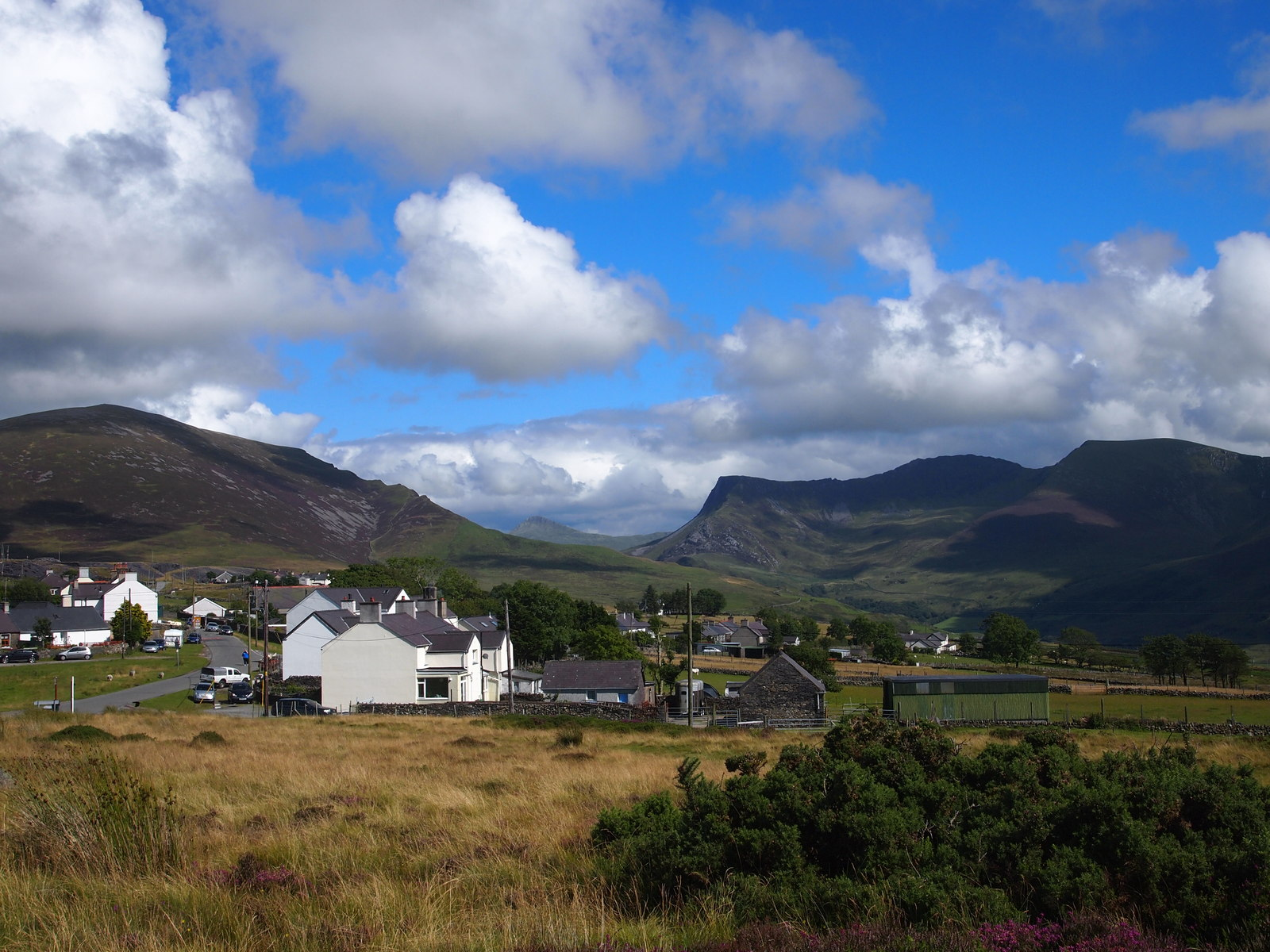
- Y Fron

- Location within Gwynedd
- OS grid reference: SH506547
- Community: Llandwrog
- Principal area: Gwynedd
- Country: Wales
- Sovereign state: United Kingdom
- Post town: CAERNARFON
- Postcode district: LL54
- Dialling code: 01286
- Police: North Wales
- Fire: North Wales
- Ambulance: Welsh
- UK Parliament: Dwyfor Meirionnydd
- Senedd Cymru – Welsh Parliament: Arfon

Y Fron, also known locally as Cesarea, after the chapel, is a country village on the south-west side of Moel Tryfan, overlooking the Nantlle Valley, in North Wales, near Rhosgadfan and Carmel, on the tail of Mynydd Mawr, with epic views of Trum Y Ddysgl and Craig Cwm Silyn. It is in the community of Llandwrog.

During the 19th century (1890s) the nearby Moel Tryfan slate quarry was a significant local employer along with a few other quarries in the local area. During this time, Y Fron was home to a bustling community and had several commercial outlets: Butcher/Abattoir, General store, Shoe shop, Post Office, Bakers, Barber, Chip shop and a furniture store. Although Moel Tryfan quarry is closer to Rhosgadfan, the railway track which carried slate to Slate Quay in the Royal town of Caernarfon passed through Y Fron and around to the area called "Drumhead" near Bryn (the road between Y Fron and Rhosgadfan). Some of the slate waste heaps or slag heaps that were left behind from hundreds of years of mining are now being put to use as materials for roads.

In 2002 the Moel Tryfan quarry was used to film Lara Croft Tomb Raider: The Cradle of Life.

The village school, Ysgol Bronyfoel, was established in 1844 as the first school in the Nantlle Valley. It has a sloping football pitch and a small play park attached. The school closed its doors for the last time in July 2015 after being open for 171 Years. Supported by money from the Big Lottery and the Welsh Government, the local community has converted the former school into a Community Centre called Canolfan Y Fron, complete with café, shop and bunk house. The historic 'Cesarea' Chapel was demolished in 2009 and Capel Bwlch-Llyn is now the only surviving religious building left standing in the village. (There may have been 3 or 4 chapels here in the past.)

The village attracts many walkers throughout the year, who begin their venture towards Mynydd Mawr and eventually around Snowdonia and onto Trum Y Ddysgl and Craig Cwm Silyn.

Annually, during the spring (April), Y Fron plays host to a small endurance race called Ras Mynydd Mawr ('Big Mountain Race'). The race begins with registration at the local school, Ysgol Bronyfoel, and continues to the peak of Mynydd Mawr, which is approximately 3.75 miles (6 km), rising 1,500 feet (460 m).
