= Rhosgadfan =

Coordinates: 53.091°N 4.230°W

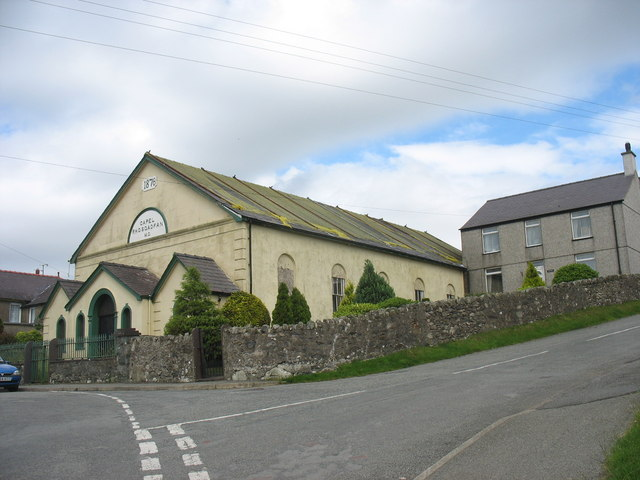
- Rhosgadfan Chapel

- Location within Gwynedd
- OS grid reference: SH506572
- Community: Llanwnda
- Principal area: Gwynedd
- Country: Wales
- Sovereign state: United Kingdom
- Post town: CAERNARFON
- Postcode district: LL54
- Dialling code: 01286
- Police: North Wales
- Fire: North Wales
- Ambulance: Welsh
- UK Parliament: Dwyfor Meirionnydd
- Senedd Cymru – Welsh Parliament: Arfon

Rhosgadfan is a Welsh village in the county of Gwynedd, formerly part of the historic county of Caernarfonshire, and within the community of Llanwnda. It is notable as the birthplace of Kate Roberts, one of the greatest Welsh-language writers of the 20th century; her childhood home is now a museum (see below).

== History and description ==
The view is of Anglesey, Yr Eifl and by walking around you can reach common land called Comin Uwch Gwyrfai and Y Lon Wen. Nearby villages include Y Fron and Rhostryfan. Rhosgadfan is on the border of Snowdonia National Park. The nearest town is Caernarfon and the nearest city is Bangor. There are no shops in Rhosgadfan even though it has a population of almost 2,000.

The closest mountain is Moel Tryfan and people from the school walk up often to collect money for educational things. Charles Darwin visited the mountain and recognised evidence of glaciation there .

Farming is the main economic activity in the village. However, the village once had a quarry behind it. The Dyffryn Nantlle (Nantlle Valley) area is well known for quarries. The one near Rhosgadfan was a film set for the Lara Croft Tomb Raider: The Cradle of Life. The farming mostly consists of sheep rearing but some other animals inhabit the area.

The football club, Mountain Rangers, is very well attended and is the focal point of the village.

The Welsh TV programme C'mon Midffild was filmed in the village hall, prior to its destruction. The hall was destroyed in a blaze believed to have been caused by arson. Nobody has been brought to justice. During March and April 2010 filming of SNOWDONIA 1890, a new television series to be shown on BBC1 Wales in the autumn of 2010, took place at various locations in the area.

== Education ==
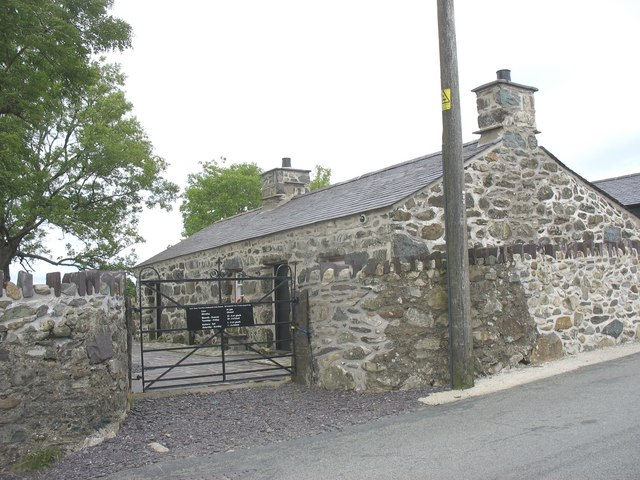
Cae'r Gors - the Kate Roberts Heritage Centre, Rhosgadfan. In 1965 Roberts bought Cae'r Gors and presented it to the nation, but at the time there was not enough money to restore it. It was not restored until 2005, after a long campaign to raise the money. It is now in the care of Cadw as a museum presentation of Roberts.

A Welsh medium primary school, Ysgol Gynradd Rhosgadfan, serves the village and the local rural community. There were 47 pupils on roll at the school in 2016, and approximately 68% of the children speak Welsh at home.
