= Alexandra quarry =

Disused slate quarry in Gwynedd, Wales

Alexandra Slate quarry
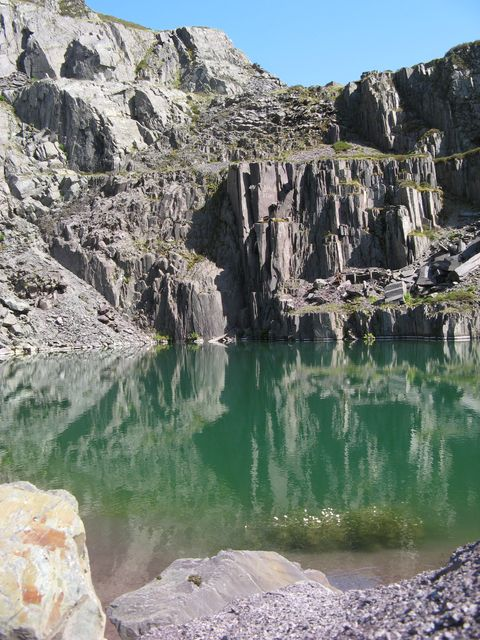
- The flooded workings of Alexandra quarry in 2018

- Location in Gwynedd

Location
- Location: near Nantlle Valley, Gwynedd, Wales; 53.0830°N 4.2117°W

Production
- Products: Slate
- Type: Quarry

Alexandra quarry was a slate quarry in North Wales, on the slopes of Moel Tryfan in north Gwynedd. It was part of one of the major slate quarrying regions of Wales, centred on the Nantlle Valley during the 19th and 20th centuries. Output increased when a connection to the North Wales Narrow Gauge Railways branch to Bryngwyn was created. It closed in the late 1930s, but was subsequently amalgamated with the Moel Tryfan quarry, and production continued until the 1960s.

== History ==
It was more difficult to access Moel Tryfan than many of the sites within the Nantlle Valley where slate was extracted, and consequently, the Alexandra quarry and the nearby Moel Tryfan quarry developed somewhat later. Moel Tryfan is a small mountain, around 1,100 feet (340 m) high, and the quarry was located on the boggy eastern slopes. The region was predominantly populated by people who speak Welsh as a first language, and it was known as Cors y Bryniau (the boggy hills in English), and more colloquially as Chwarel y Gors (swamp quarry). There is no recorded activity prior to 1824, when John Roberts and John Morgan applied for a lease to the Crown for a substantial tract of land on the eastern slopes. Morgan ran the Williams Bank in Caernarfon, while Roberts owned ships and was involved in lead mining. Both men were involved with slate quarrying separately, but there is no evidence that the lease was granted to them jointly.

According to John Griffiths, a historian and quarry manager writing in 1889, men from Brynyfferam quarry were sent to cut a trench near the site, where they found a slate vein, but work ceased when Robert Hughes, the manager of Brynyfferam quarry died in 1828. Around ten years later, John Collins from Moel Tryfan quarry sank a shaft near the earlier workings, but again work ceased. Next came William W Griffith, the works manager of Moelwyn quarry, who with Benjamin Lloyd of the Grapes Inn, Maentwrog, applied for a take note for 185 acres (75 ha) in 1861. The Crown agent only awarded them 92 acres (37 ha) while land lower down the mountain was awarded to Joseph Wellbourne of the Hafod y Wern quarry, who then tried to tempt Griffith to work with him on both sites. Griffith was not swayed, despite stating that they needed the lower land to provide tunnel access to the workings. Men were set to work constructing a tunnel at a higher level, and they hit slatey rock soon afterwards, at which point a lease replaced the take note.

After Griffith outwitted Lloyd's plans for a company to work the site without him, the two men attracted wealthy investors with the lease, including Sir Thomas Bateson and his brother Samuel Stephenson Bateson, who formed the Alexandra Slate Company Ltd in 1863. The company had an authorised capital of £40,000, and shareholders included four of Bateson's relatives, Lloyd and two of his brothers. They wanted more land, and negotiated a new lease for 133 acres (54 ha), at which point Griffith took a cut of £500 plus £9,500 in shares and bowed out. The company took its name from Princess Alexandra of Denmark, who had recently married the Prince of Wales (later King Edward VII).

Morris Jones, formerly of Braich-Rhydd quarry, was in charge of operations, and most of the early work involved removing overburden, but he thought the rock beneath was of good quality. The Crown inspector, however, thought it was "unpromising". The company leased another 92 acres (37 ha) which became the Lefal Fawr site (big tunnel), but by 1866, the number of workers had dropped from 50 to 12. The inspector discussed the site with the engineer and agent, and agreed that a tunnel from Welbourne's land was required. As Welbourne was not working his land, he consented to a change of lease, but the Alexandra company could not find enough ground to tip the spoil, or the cost of constructing the tunnel, and nothing was done.

Having invested £11,000 in the project, with no real benefit, Charles Easton Spooner was asked to advise on what should be done. As consulting engineer, he suggested a deep adit, driven from the north of the site, which would intercept two slate veins which were clearly visible in the adjacent Moel Tryfan quarry. Construction started in 1869, but the company became bankrupt, and Sir Thomas Bateson, acting as liquidator, sold the quarry to his brother Samuel for £990. Samuel Bateson continued working on the tunnel, but progress was slow as much of it was cut though hard greenstone. William Thomas of Rhosgadfan was killed in a firing accident on 15 May 1869 while working on the tunnel. One of the first uses of an air compressor and mechanical drilling in the slate quarrying industry helped to speed up progress, but the tunnel failed to find the first vein after it had been driven for 288 yards (263 m). A change in the dip of the rock below ground meant that it was not encountered until the tunnel reached 410 yards (370 m), by which time £33,000 had been spent, with £19,000 of that being Bateson's own money. However, the rock found was of good quality.

=== Development ===
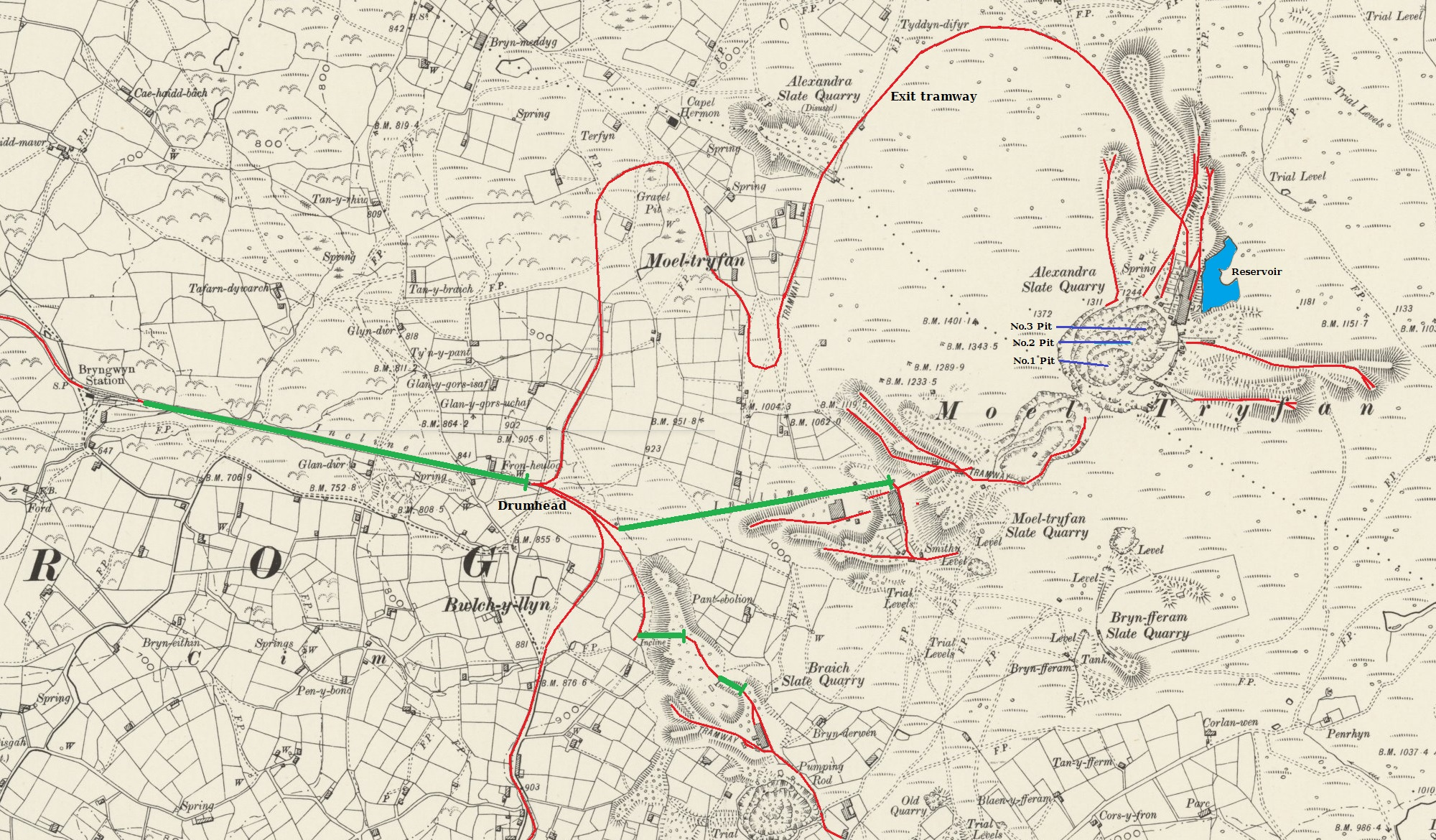
Map of Alexandra quarry around 1913, including the exit tramway and Bryngwyn incline

In order to develop the quarry, a second Alexandra Slate Company Ltd was formed in 1874, with Samual Bateson as its managing director and Sir Thomas Bateson and two of his brothers being major shareholders. The quarry produced 891 tons of product in 1875. Samuel Bateson seems to have spent another £15,000 of his own money on development, and had also bailed out the North Wales Narrow Gauge Railways to stop them from becoming bankrupt. A 2-mile (3.2 km) sinuous railway from the quarry to the railway's Bryngwyn Drumhead, from where an incline descended to Bryngwyn station, would enable slates to be shipped out more conveniently. Three locomotives were bought to work in the quarries, and the fourth to operate the exit tramway, which was completed in 1877. With the tunnel acting as a drain and an access tramway, the quarry pit was enlarged significantly.

Samuel Bateson died in 1879, but the lease was reassigned to his widow, Florinda Bateson, jointly with Sir Thomas Bateson, Wentworth Fitzwilliam, and John Menzies, who had been managing the quarry for almost a decade, although he was also managing the Cambrian quarry at Llanberis. Although the slate industry suffered a slump in the 1880s, Menzies pushed ahead, and the number of workers increased from 180 to 230 as the decade progressed. New leases were negotiated, covering 226 acres (91 ha), and sales in 1886 reached £16,000. A steam-powered mill was erected in 1887–88, with De Winton's of Caernarfon initially supplying 20 saw tables, and probably also supplying the steam engine to drive the mill. Four steam winders, to raise trucks to the mill level, were installed nearby in 1888, and a water-balanced shaft was also being used to raise rock by 1893. A large fall of rock from the sides of the quarry occurred in 1888, which took about a year to clear, and the main purple-red vein was interrupted by a granite pillar at the north-east end of the workings. They cut through it and found good quality blue rock beyond it.

The safety record in the quarry was good, with only one fatality between 1883 and 1892, but between 1895 and 1913, eight men died, possibly because the quarry faces became less stable. In 1907 a passenger on the footplate of Kathleen, the locomotive that worked the exit tramway, was killed when a boiler tube blew. The driver was severely scalded, and the accident resulted in the agent and the company both being fined £50 for failing to adhere to boiler inspection regulations. Robert P Williams the quarry manager left to manage the nearby Moel Tryfan quarry in 1894, and was replaced by the equally capable Hugh Roberts from the New Braich quarry. Two years later, employment reached its peak, with 257 men working in the quarry. Finished product was carried on the North Wales Narrow Gauge Railways for a rate of 2/2d (11p) from Bryngwyn Drumhead to Dinas. The price included transhipment to the London and North Western Railway at Dinas, and use of the trucks on connecting lines not owned by the railway. The rate was the same for all customers presenting wagons at Drumhead, which prevented the bitter rivalry that plagued the Ffestiniog Railway at Blaenau Ffestiniog.

As the No.3 pit expanded, the mill was gradually moved further to the east over a period of five years. The new mill was powered by a suction producer gas engine, and other new technology included two steam-driven Blondin cableways installed in 1901. Output per man dropped in 1904, when the first of several serious collapses of the quarry faces occurred. The Crown inspector noted that the quality of rock being extracted was improving as galleries to the east got deeper, but that collapses were still a problem in the west of the quarry. The quality of rock found in the No.1 pit to the west deteriorated during 1905 and 1906, when there was a collapse in No.3 pit, and the moving of the mill was completed.

John Menzies died in 1907, and it was a great loss for the quarry, for he was replaced as managing director by his son Arthur W Kay Menzies, a man who lacked the wisdom and flair of his father. He appointed W M Jones from the Dorothea quarry as the manager. Another Blondin cableway was installed in 1909, but trouble loomed. Menzies balanced the books by making cuts to the wages unilaterally, which led to a series of wage disputes. A rock fall of 30,000 tons and another of 20,000 tons occurred in 1910 in the No.1 pit, while another fall of 100,000 tons in 1911 buried the workings. The steam engines were replaced by 500 volt 3-phase electric motors in 1913, with power coming from the Cwm Dyli hydro-electric station via an 11,000 volt transmission line to Pen-yr-Orsedd quarry.

Menzies again cut wages in 1913, and the dispute led to the North Wales Quarrymen's Union calling their second official strike in the 40 years since they had started representing the industry. Over 200 men went on strike and it dragged on from October 1913 to April 1914, when agreement was reached, favouring the workers. W M Jones was replaced by L Pritchard as manager, who restarted operations, employing 220 men. The new start was short lived, as the quarry closed on 15 August 1914, with the onset of World War I. Menzies was called up in 1915, and the secretary, Alfred H Richards, took over. Although a liquidator was appointed in 1916, the quarry was not stripped and dismantled, because a plan to amalgamate the best of the Crown quarries in the area once the war ended was hatched. The quarry was effectively sold to the Amalgamated Slate Association Ltd in 1918, merely by transferring the shares. An inventory of all of the assets was made, and these were valued at £10,788.

=== Amalgamation ===
In the aftermath of World War I, many of the smaller slate quarries had little chance of restarting after four years of shortages, both of men and materials. One possibility was to create larger units out of several smaller ones. This had been tried before in the 1890s or 1900s, when Mr O'Hagan of London had suggested it, but Moel Tryfan quarry had expressed doubts that it could be made to work, and Alexandra quarry had opposed the plan, resulting in nothing happening. Dinorwic quarry and Penrhyn quarry had already shown that they could wipe out smaller quarries by price cutting in the 1880s, and the only way to compete with them was amalgamation. The idea for such a venture had been hatched in 1916, when Alexandra quarry was facing liquidation, and was probably suggested by the Crown Commissioners or the Treasury. The idea became reality in 1918, when the Amalgamated Slate Association Ltd was set up, combining Alexandra quarry, Moel Tryfan quarry and Cilgwyn quarry, together with the defunct Braich quarry.

On paper, the new company had £41,500 of issued capital, but most of this was in ordinary shares, which were transferred to the shareholders of the constituent companies without any money changing hands. There were 6,657 preference shares, which had been paid for in cash, which gave the company just £6,657 in working capital. Alexandra quarry, where the pits were modelled on the gallery system used at Penrhyn, was valued at £17,400, while Moel Tryfan was valued at £9,000. Cilgwyn was bigger than either of them. Alfred Roberts became the agent and secretary, while Ellis Williams was the manager. Both were experience men, and they ensured that the amalgamation worked, becoming one of the top three concerns working the Caernarfonshire Cambrian slate beds. They employed 78 men initially, and operated at a loss for the first seven months, but made a small profit by the end of the first year, as a result of output from Cilgwyn.

Output and profits were variable, not helped by a 13-week coal strike in 1921, when only Alexandra could continue operating, due to its use of electricity. A fourth Blondin cableway was constructed at Alexandra in 1925, to make the removal of rock from pits 1 and 2 easier. A serious rock fall stopped production at Alexandra for two months in October 1926, and the 1926 coal strike again affected profits. Violent storms damaged two of the cableway towers, and there were major rock falls in Alexandra No.1 pit and the main working face at Moel Tryfan, resulting in the company reporting it first losses in 1928.

The quarries were closed from January to April 1930, due to heavy snow, there were large cracks above the faces at both Moel Tryfan and Alexandra. The company pleaded with the government for some assistance, by deferring payment of debenture interest, and suggested that the Crown Commissioners should hire two steam excavators to remove huge amounts of overburden. This course of action would be considerably cheaper that putting 500 men out of work and onto the dole, but no public money was forthcoming. The quarries closed later that year. The Labour government then asked Dorothea quarry if they would take over the operation, but they declined, stating that public money should be spent first. Unemployment in Rhosgadfan reached 99.9 per cent when the quarries were closed.

A rescue plan for the Alexandra and Moel Tryfan quarries was devised by the Liberal member of Parliament Major Owen, and the county alderman Owen W Owen. Owen and his business partners, who were working Rhos quarry at Capel Curig, formed the Caernarvonshire Crown Slate Quarries Company, with a working capital of just £5,000. The Labour government lost the 1931 general election and Major Owen persuaded the new Conservative government that investment of public money would be politically and economically expedient, and a grant of £15,000 was obtained to remove the overburden. This was later increased to £18,500. Small groups of men were employed to work the tips for rock which had been discarded, but could now be used, while the job of removing the overburden from Alexandra quarry began. After removing 23,000 tons of rock without reaching the underlying slate, attention turned to Moel Tryfan quarry. The company announced they would be exporting the slates by lorry, rather than using the Welsh Highland Railway, but Owen faced criticism from the council and others, and the railway was used when proper production began in late 1932.

Former workers from the Amalgamated Slate Association were employed by the government scheme to remove the overburden at Alexandra quarry, and a job-sharing rota was used to ensure that all of the unemployed were able to gain some income. In 1934, around 2,000 tons of slate were produced by 70 workers, which had risen to 3,000 tons in 1935, with 140 men employed, although this total included 40 who were working on rubbish removal. Owen W Owen died in 1934, and was replaced by John James Riley. By 1935, the company had three locomotives in working order. Slates from Moel Tryfan were sent down the exit incline, and moved by horse along the short tramway to Bryngwyn Drumhead. Cligwyn quarry was also producing slates by this time, but these were taken away by lorry. Electric power was installed in the Moel Tryfan quarry during 1935, and any usable plant from Alexandra quarry was moved there. The quarry had ceased to use the Welsh Highland Railway in 1935, which closed in 1936. By the outbreak of the Second World War, the quarry was working on a smaller scale, although additional slates were still being produced by reworking the old tips, and granite was extracted for the County Council.

=== Social history ===
Quarries were dangerous places, and by the 1840s, most quarries had established sick clubs. Workers would pay a small subscription each month and could draw benefits if they suffered from sickness or accidents. Some quarry owners also contributed to health care, and Dr Evan Roberts of Penygroes received one shilling (5p) per month from the Alexandra quarry and eight others in the Nantlle Valley, to act as a quarry doctor.

There was also unrest in the quarries from the 1870s, and following two strikes in 1874, membership of the North Wales Quarrymen's Union increased significantly, with around two-thirds of all workers joining. The returns for 1877-78 show that 110 quarrymen from Alexandra were members of the union.

The quarry featured in the writings of the author Kate Roberts, who was born in Rhosgadfan on the slopes of Moel Tryfan. William Gruffydd, one of the characters in her 1936 novel Traed Mewn Cyffion ('Feet in Chains') describes how his grandfather had died in an accident in the quarry, which looked 'like an old witch making fun of him' because the waste tips stood out on both sides of the hill, making it look like a witch's hat. The narrator is William's mother Jane, who says:

...the quarry and its tip crawling down the mountain like an adder. From a distance, the slate waste looked good, shining in the sunlight. This was the quarry where Ifan's father had been killed. Who emptied the first rubble wagon over that tip-end there? He was in his grave by now, that was sure. And who would be the last to tip a load of rubble over the top? And what was the use of dreaming like this? ... There was something sad in the whole prospect, the quarry, the village and the mountain all mixed up together.

== Bibliography ==
- Boyd, J I C (1972). Narrow Gauge Railways in South Caernarvonshire. Oakwood Press. ISBN 978-0-85361-115-8. OCLC 636874685.
- Gwyn, David (2015). Welsh Slate - Archaeology and History of an Industry. Royal Commission on the Ancient and Historical Monuments of Wales. ISBN 978-1-871184-51-8.
- Jones, Gwynfor Pierce; Richards, Alun John (2004). Cwm Gwyrfai - The quarries of the North Wales Narrow Gauge and the Welsh Highland Railway. Carreg Gwalch. ISBN 978-0-86381-897-4.
- Lindsay, Jean (1974). A History of the North Wales Slate Industry. David and Charles. ISBN 978-0-7153-6265-5.
- Richards, Alun John (1999). The Slate Regions of North and Mid Wales. Gwasg Carreg Gwalch. ISBN 978-0-86381-552-2.
