= Slate industry in the Nantlle Valley =

Slate quarries in Wales

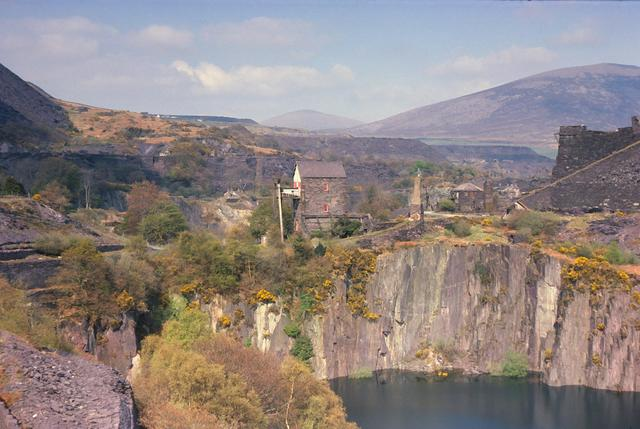
The pumping house at Dorothea

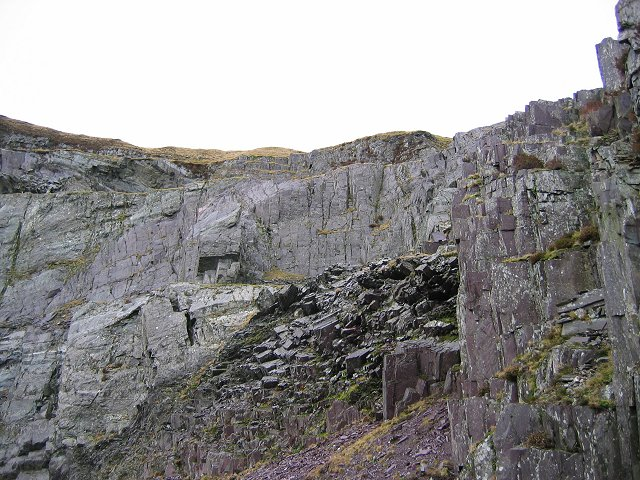
Moel Tryfan and Alexandra quarries

The Slate Industry in the Nantlle Valley was the major industry of the area. The Nantlle Valley is the site of oldest slate quarry in Wales at Cilgwyn, and during the nineteenth and twentieth centuries it was a major centre of the Slate industry in Wales. The quarries of the area are a World Heritage Site.

== Geology ==
The slate veins that cross the Nantlle Valley are nearly vertical. The Faengoch ("Red Vein") runs through the Cilgwyn and Braich quarries and produced red and purple coloured slates. The Pen-y-Bryn quarry produced purple and blue slates with a thin vein of green slate between them.

== History ==
The Nantlle Valley was one of the major slate quarrying regions of Wales during the nineteenth and twentieth centuries, having at least 37 operating slate quarries at one given time. It was an innovative region in the development of the slate industry. The Cilgwyn quarry on the north side of the valley is the oldest in Wales and one of the oldest in Europe, dating from the 12th century. By the start of the 19th century, slate was still being extracted in a primitive manner:

"The stones were smashed up with a hammer without any rule; any piece of rock which happened to be of anything like a slate was made use of, but at least half of the good rock was destroyed. The men at that time took contracts from the landowners, paying two guineas per annum for the privilege of quarrying slates. Each man dug a hole where he thought proper, and many of the quarries to this day are suffering from the heedless way in which the holes were excavated and the rubble disposed of usually thrown out close to the hole on the good vein."

The first steam engine to be used in the slate industry was a pump installed at the Hafodlas quarry in the valley in 1807. Slate roofing tiles have been excavated at Segontium Roman camp in Caernarfon and are thought to have originated in the Nantlle Valley.

Unlike most of the other slate producing regions in Wales the Nantlle Valley developed a large number of small, independent quarries because most of the land in the valley was owned by a number of small landowners rather than a single large landowner. At the height of the industry there were over 50 quarries being worked in the valley.

Due to this the quarries were never managed as a large single concern as they were in the Penrhyn, Dinorwic and the Festiniog area quarries and this led to the industry in the area being much more vulnerable to any downturns in the economy. This also led to the development of an industrial landscape that is quite different from the other slate quarrying regions in that there are a large number of small waste slate heaps around the valley.

A dispute between local crofter-quarrymen and the local large landowner, Lord Newborough of the Wynn family from Glynllifon became an important legal landmark in the early 19th century. In 1823, Lord Newborough tried to have a law passed to give him control of all the Moel Tryfan Commons, including recent encroachments, and to extinguish the rights of common use. This move was met with fearsome opposition, not least from one John Evans who was concerned that enclosure around the Cilgwyn quarries would affect his own interests, particularly over a dam and watercourse that he had constructed on Crown land in 1816. Evans organised a commoners’ petition against the Bill, with seven hundred signatures. The petitioners claimed that their cottages had been built over forty years earlier, that originally the land had been too wild for cultivation, and that they had improved it by hard work. This led to a change in the land enclosure law in the United Kingdom.

Another dispute much celebrated in the area took place a generation later centred on the largest quarry in the valley. Dorothea Quarry was bought in 1835 by an Englishman called Muskett. He spent heavily on new equipment to raise the wagons from the quarry bottom. But he overspent, and was declared bankrupt a few years later. The quarry was closed with three months wages owing to most of the workers. They consequently revolted and demolished the new house Muskett had built for himself - Plas y Cilgwyn.

== Technology ==
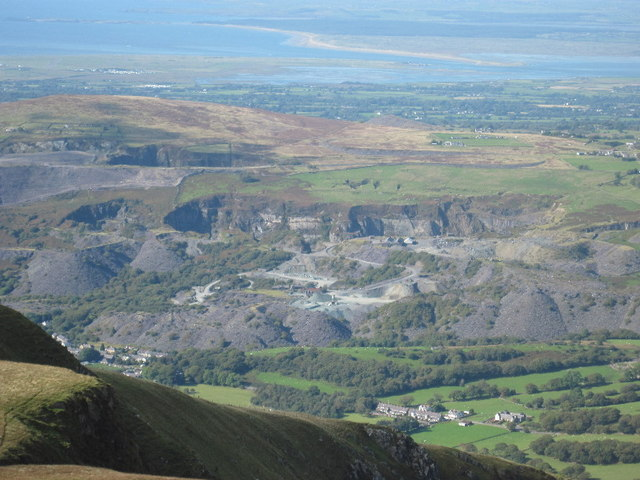
Pen-yr-Orsedd quarry seen from Mynydd Tal-y-Mignedd

There were considerable difficulties involved in raising slate from the pits and in keeping them free from water, and the ingenious ways which were found to solve these problems, including blondins, chain inclines, powered rail inclines and vast revetments, are some of the principal reasons why the slate quarrying remains in this area, many of which are unique, are so important. Some of the principal features include the 1906 Cornish beam-engine at Dorothea, a unique survival in Wales, the mill and a number of pyramids, also unique, and the blondins at Pen-yr-Orsedd quarry.

Cilgwyn quarry installed a water-powered rail incline in 1825, to help remove fallen rock from a pit - one of the first recorded uses of this technology. In 1899, the first two blondins in the slate industry were installed at Pen-yr-orsedd; they were each powered by a 2-cylinder stationary steam engine. The next blondin at the quarry in 1906 was powered by an electrical motor, supplied by the newly installed power line from the North Wales Power and Traction Company.

== Transportation ==
Slate from the quarries was transported to the major local shipping point at Caernarfon by pack horse. In 1813, a railway was proposed to allow the Nantlle quarries to compete with the nearby Dinorwic and Penrhyn quarries - in 1822, it cost Cilgwyn quarry 20 shillings to ship 1,000 slates from the quarry to Caernarfon - equivalent to £89 in 2016. An Act of Parliament was passed on 20 May 1825 and the Nantlle Railway Company was incorporated in June 1825. The chief engineer was George Stephenson and construction was overseen by his son Robert, assisted by John Gillespie. The 3 ft 6 in (1,067 mm) gauge railway was opened in 1828.

In 1867, the Nantlle Railway was acquired by the Carnarvonshire Railway and the northern part of the line was converted to standard gauge. In 1870 it was acquired by the London and North Western Railway and became part of the London Midland and Scottish Railway in 1923, and then British Railways in 1948. The 3 ft 6 in (1,067 mm) gauge section continued to be operated using horses until it closed in 1963.

The majority of the slate quarries in the Nantlle Valley were connected to the Nantlle Railway. However, the Alexandra, Moel Tryfan, Fron, Braich and Cilgwyn quarries, near the summit of Moel Tryfan, were connected by an incline to the Bryngwyn branch of the North Wales Narrow Gauge Railways. Cilgwyn quarry was the only one that shipped slate out via both the Nantlle and North Wales Narrow Gauge Railways.

== Quarries ==
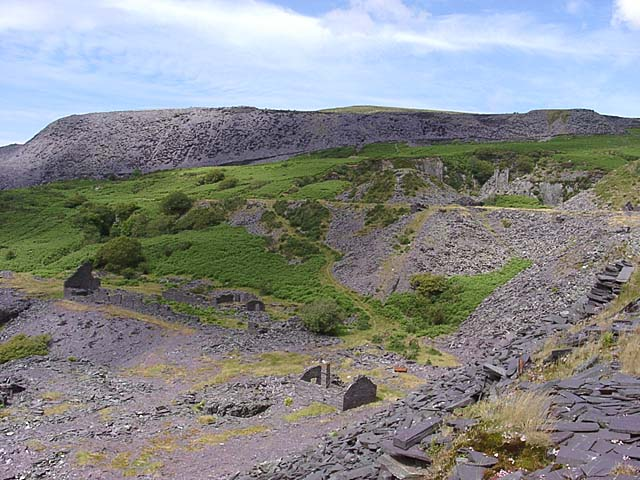
Pen-y-bryn quarry in 2002

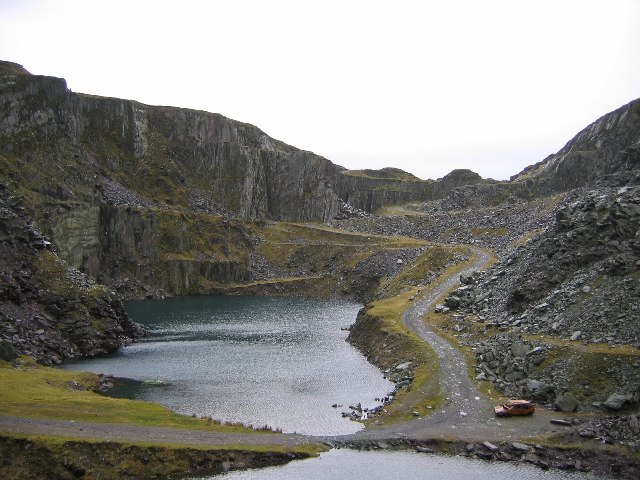
Moel Tryfan quarry in 2004

The major slate quarries in the Nantlle Valley were:

- Cilgwyn quarry
- Pen-yr-Orsedd quarry
- Dorothea quarry
- Alexandra quarry
- Moel Tryfan quarry
- Pen-y-bryn quarry (also known as Cloddfa'r Lon)
- Tal-y-sarn quarry
- Braich-y-Rhydd quarry
- Vron quarry
- Coedmadoc quarry
- Cloddfacoed quarry
- Gwernor Graig quarry
- Tymawr East quarry
- Tymawr West quarry
- Plassddu quarry
- Llwydgoed quarry
