= Blondin (crane) =

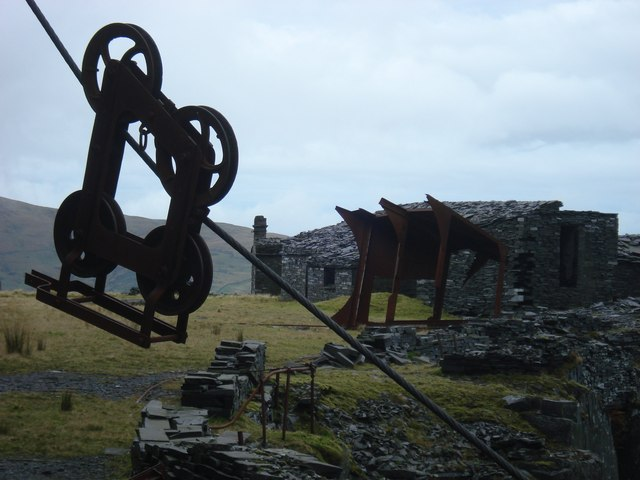
A Blondin ropeway at Dinorwic quarry, Gwynedd

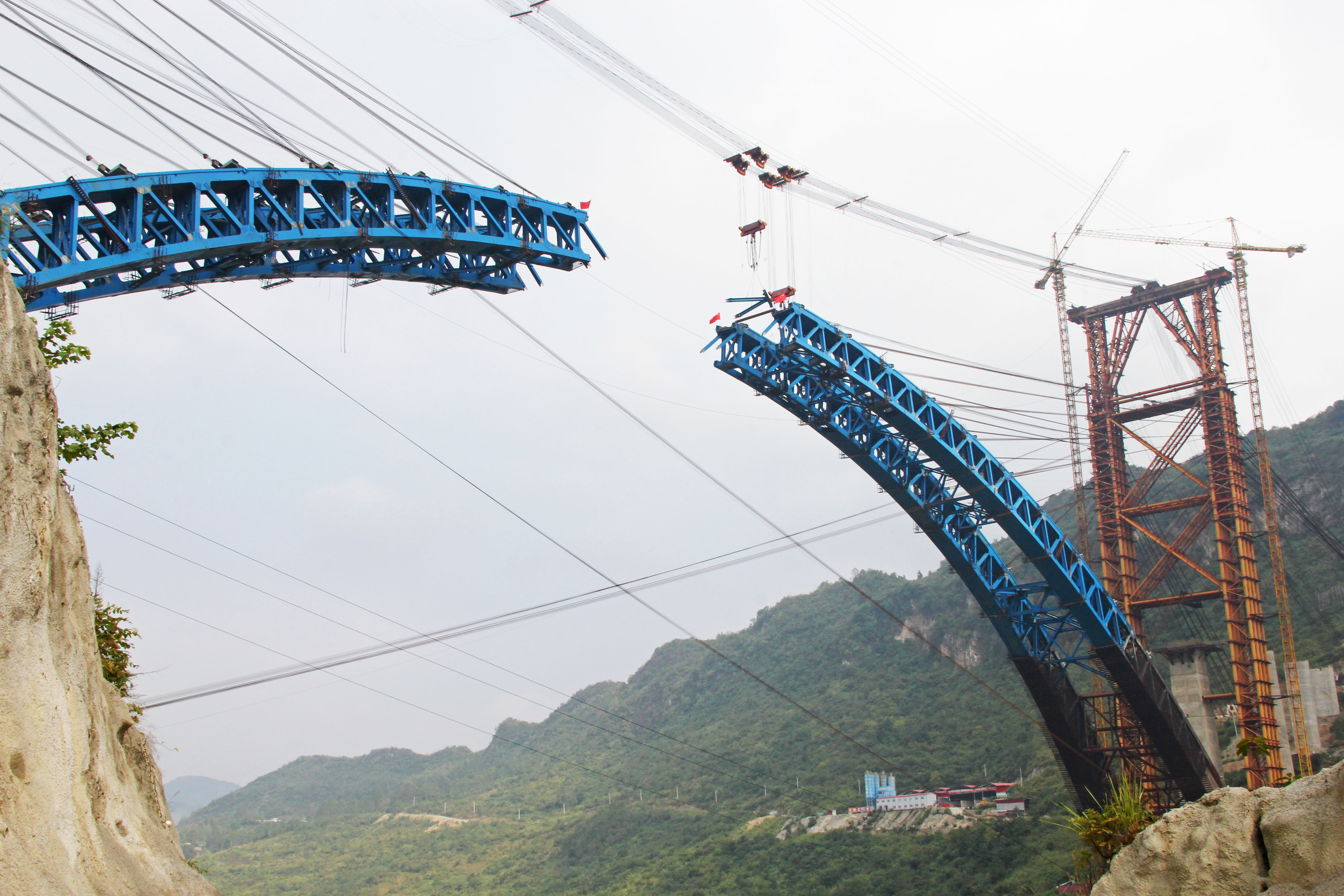
Cable crane (top cables) used for bridge construction

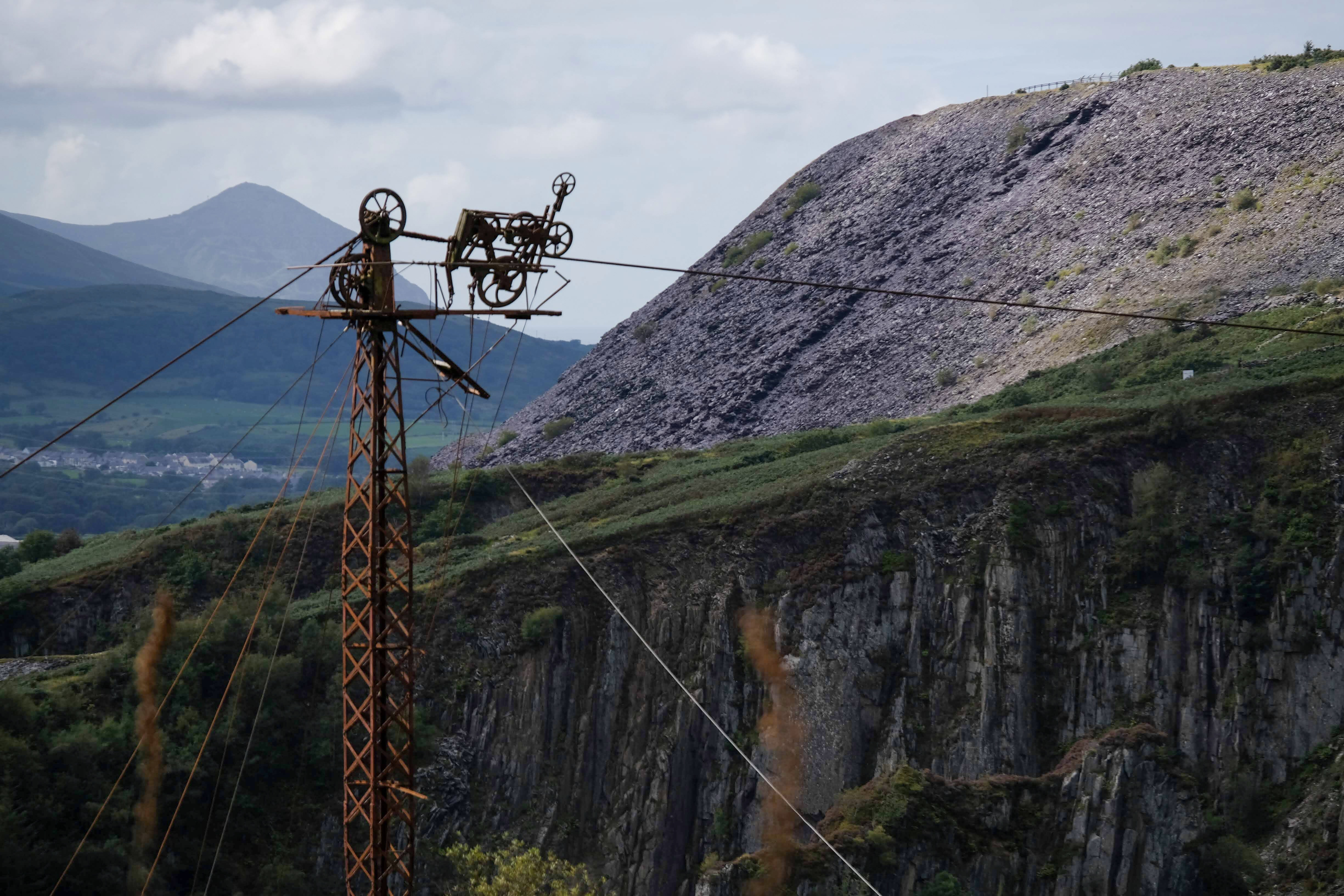
A photograph of a Blondin at Pen yr Orsedd quarry.

Blondins (also known as cable crane, funicular crane, cableway) are a type of material ropeway; they were named after the famous tightrope walker Charles Blondin.

== Description ==
Blondins are a specialized type of material ropeway that incorporates a mechanism to raise and lower loads vertically from the suspended ropeway. This allowed them to cross wide, deep spaces such as quarries and move material from the floor up to the level of the ropeway and across to the edge of the quarry. They are powered either by a steam or electrical hoist.

== History ==
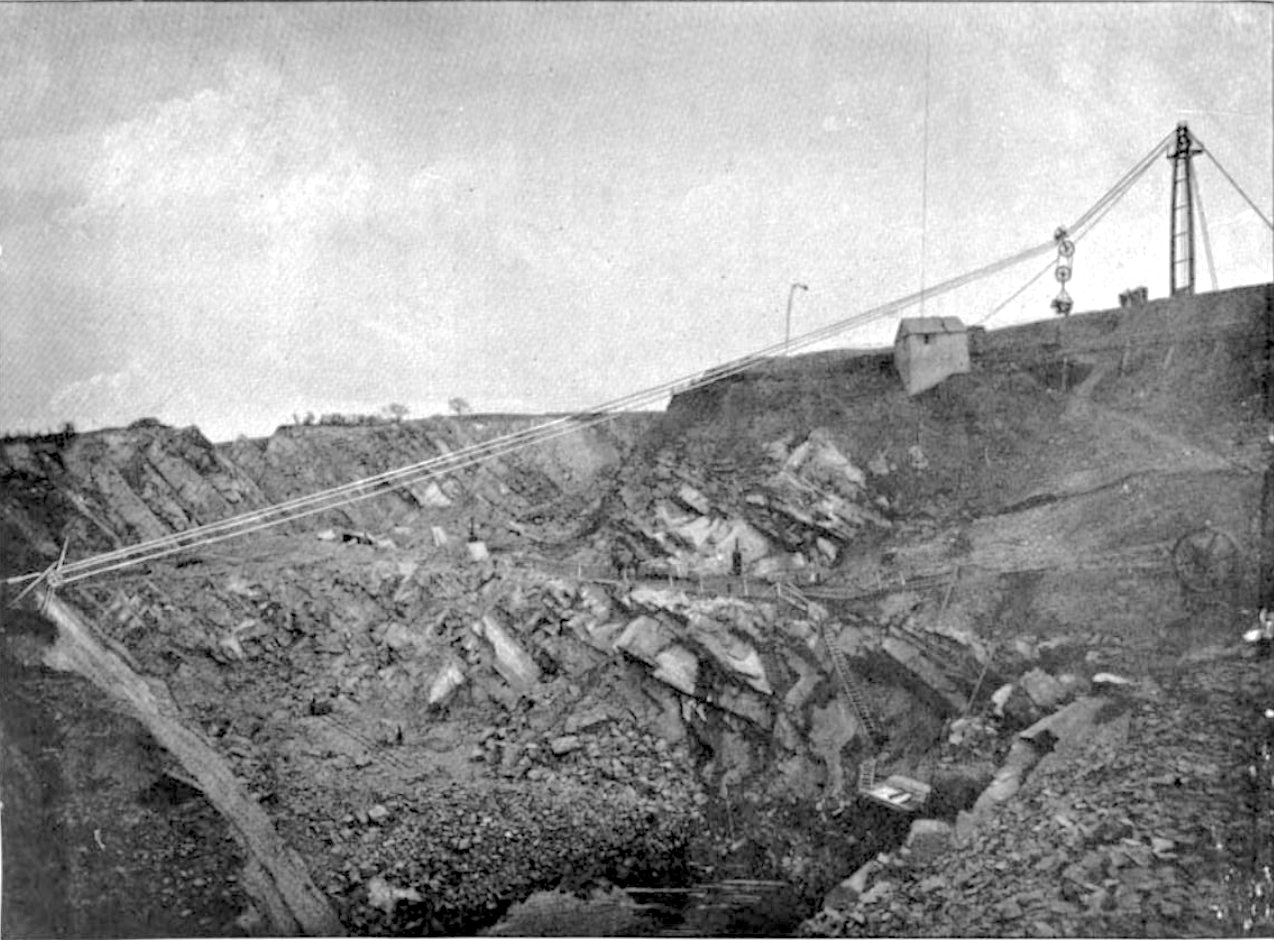
A blondin at Stoney Stanton quarry, showing the cableway crossing a deep pit. At the top right a wagon is suspended from the cradle, ready to be lowered to the quarry floor

Blondins were developed by John Fyfe, a Scottish quarry engineer. He installed the first example in 1872 at Kemnay granite quarry at Garioch. In 1896, John M. Henderson and Co. introduced the first commercially available Blondin system, which used steel ropes instead of the earlier iron ropes. The first installation at a Welsh slate quarry was a pair of blondins at Pen-yr-Orsedd quarry in 1899. These were powered by stationary steam engines.

Penrhyn quarry in Bethesda was based around a single large pit over 400 feet deep, worked as a series of terraces. It adopted blondins in 1913. A variety of means were used to transport slate from the terraces to the mills where the rock was processed. The quarry already had an extensive internal narrow gauge railway system in place, and many terraces were connected via inclines. Blondins were used to connect more remote terraces directly to the mills – they were distinguished by the fact that rock was transported on the ropeways in railway wagons slung from cradles. The ropeways ran horizontally or nearly horizontally until the cradle hit a stop, at which point the wagons were automatically lowered to ground level, where they were moved by rail to the point of loading or unloading.

== Uses ==
Blondins were used in many countries, notably the United Kingdom and the United States. Though most well known in the Welsh slate industry, they were used in quarries of many sorts, and on bridge construction and other engineering projects.

== Bibliography ==
- Bignami, M. (1 July 2004). Elsevier's Dictionary of Engineering: English/American, German, French, Italian, Spanish and Portuguese/Brazilian. Elsevier Science. ISBN 978-0-444-51467-7.
- Stuart Baker. "5: Blondins". In Gordon & Ann Hatherill (ed.). Slate Quarry Album (Second ed.). RCL Publications. pp. 38–43. ISBN 978-0-9538763-8-9.
