= Cilgwyn quarry =

Former slate quarry in Gwynedd, Wales

Cilgwyn
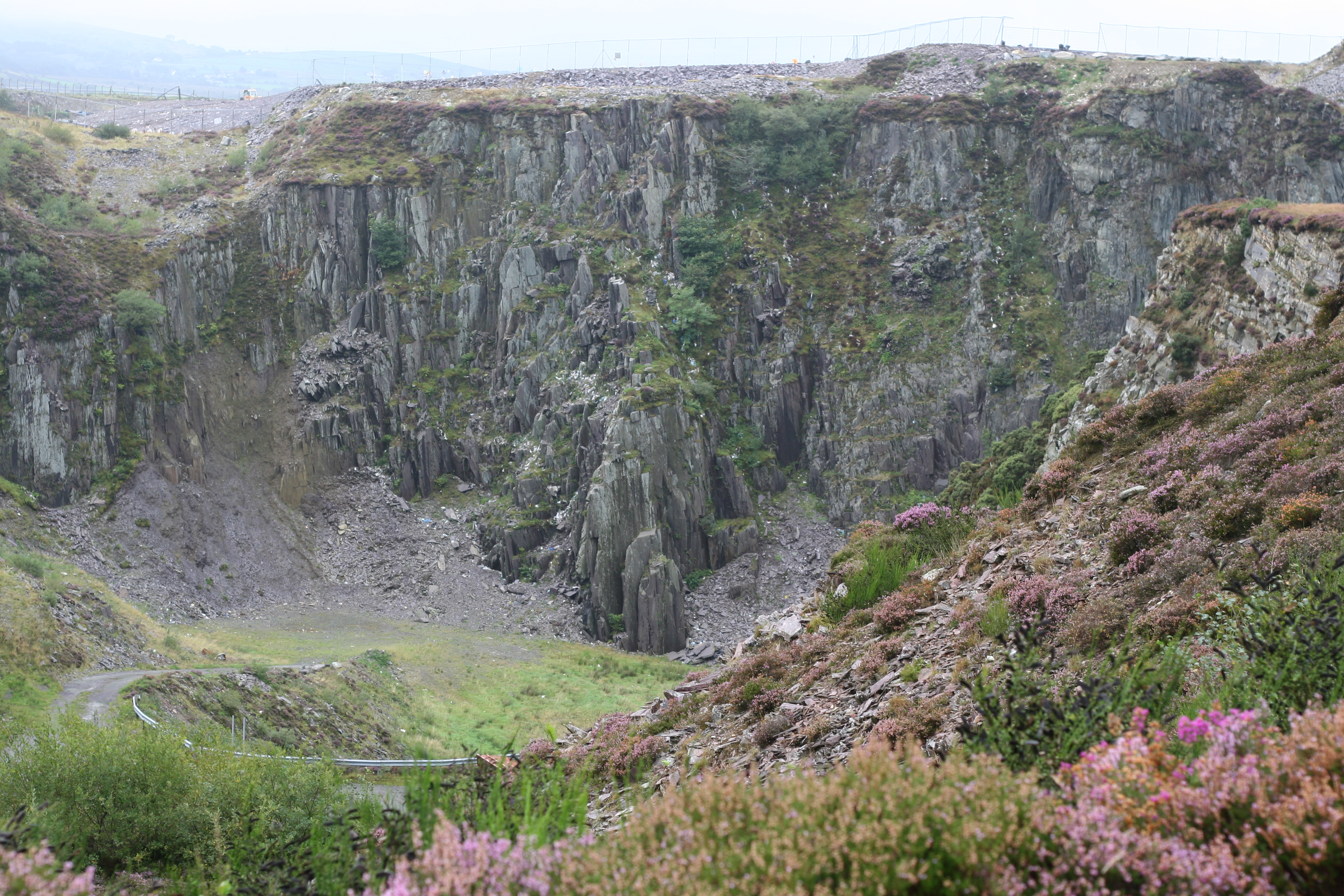
- The main pit at Cilgwyn in 2006

- Location in Gwynedd
- Location: Near Nantlle, Carnarvonshire (now Gwynedd), Wales; 53°3′41″N 4°14′19″W SH 500 539
- Products: Slate
- Type: Quarry
- Opened: 12th century
- Closed: 1956

Cilgwyn quarry is a slate quarry located on the north edge of the Nantlle Valley, in North Wales. It is one of the earliest slate quarries in Great Britain, having been worked as early as the 12th century. King Edward I of England was reputed to have stayed in a house roofed by Cilgwyn slates during his conquest of Wales. It is one of the major slate quarries in the Nantlle Valley area.

== History ==
Quarrying at Cilgwyn dates back to the 12th century. By the end of the 18th century a large number of small pits had grown into a substantial working.

The Cilgwyn Quarry Company was formed in 1800 by the Caernarfon solicitor John Evans. By the 1820s it had been taken over by the Cilgwyn and Cefn Du Slate Company, though this company collapsed in 1831. It was then taken over by George Alfred Muskett, a banker from St Albans who served as MP for that city from 1837 to 1841. Muskett's tenure was not successful, and by 1840 the quarry was failing. Many of the quarrymen went unpaid and they resorted to selling slates directly instead of through the company. Muskett fled the country in 1842, leaving behind debts of £10,000 (equivalent to £1,065,000 in 2016); he died in exile a year later.

Quarrying later resumed at Cilgwyn but it failed again between 1843 and 1844, closing with debts of around £20,000. Cilgwyn was operating again by the 1850s and developed four main pits. In 1882, 7,430 tons of finished slate were produced. Between 1864 and 1895 between 200 and 304 workers were employed at Cilgwyn; this had dropped to 51 to 102 between 1918 and 1937. Quarrying continued at Cilgwyn until 1956.

In the early 2000s, the quarry was used as a waste dump by the local council, but landfill activity ceased in January 2009.

== Description ==
Cilgwyn was an opencast quarry comprising three main pits: Gloddfa Glitiau to the north-east, Old Cilgwyn to the west and Veingoch to the south-east. Earlier in its history there were a larger number of smaller pits. The mills stood on top of significant waste tips to the south and east of the pits. A tramway north ran from the mills to another waste-tipping site to the north of the quarry at Bryn Hyfryd Terrace.

== Transportation ==
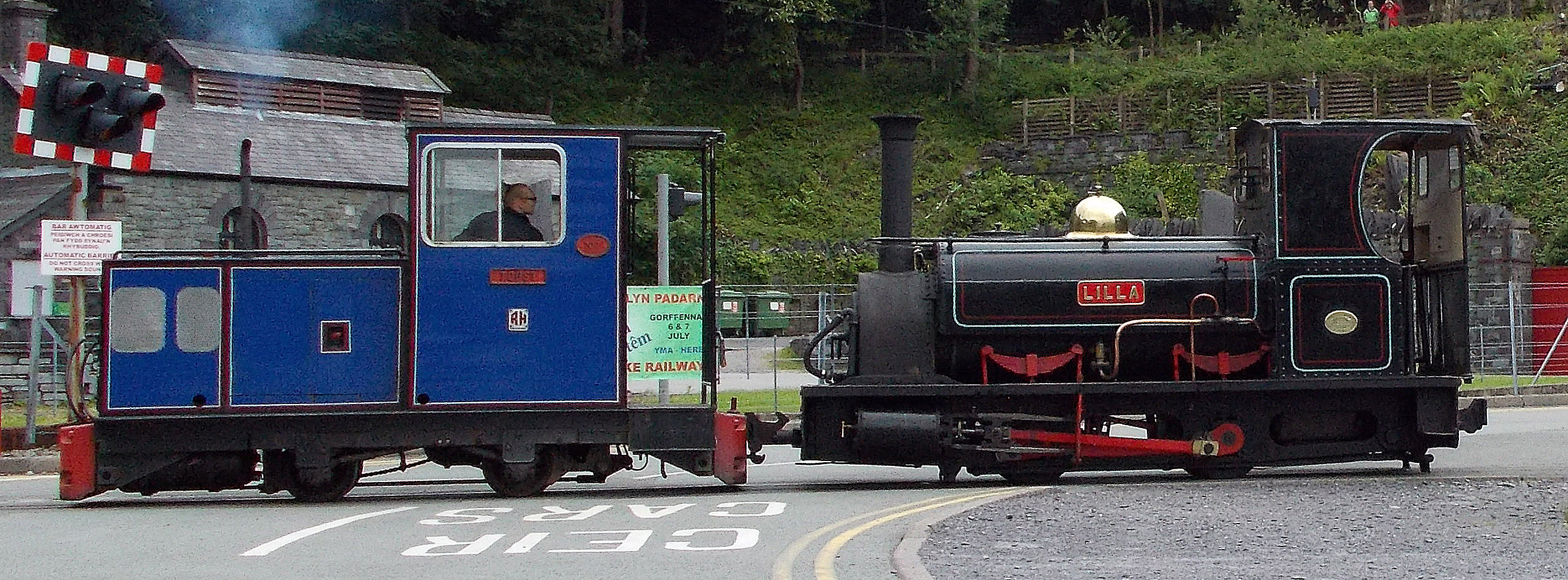
The ex-Cilgwyn steam locomotive "Lilla" shown visiting the Llanberis Lake Railway

Cilgwyn quarry was connected to the 3 ft 6 in (1,067 mm) gauge Nantlle Railway by a pair of inclines that dropped from the Cilgwyn mill level through Gallt-y-fedw quarry to a junction at Talysarn Uchaf. Internally the quarry had an extensive network of 2 ft (610 mm) gauge tramways. These served the three main pits and the waste tips. A mile-long tramway ran from the mills round a horseshoe curve to a waste tip on the north side of Mynydd y Cilgwyn. In 1923 a connection was made from this tramway to the line connecting Fron quarry to Bryngwyn. This allowed slates to be dispatched from Cilgwyn onto the Welsh Highland Railway, avoiding the need to transship slates from the internal quarry wagons into the Nantlle Railway's wagons.

The quarry used at least three steam locomotives internally from 1876: Queenie, a Bagnall; Lilla, a large quarry Hunslet and Jubilee 1897, built by Manning Wardle. Lilia and Jubilee 1897 were sold in 1928 for use on the Penrhyn Quarry Railway and both survived into preservation – Lilla on the Ffestiniog Railway and Jubilee 1897 at the Narrow Gauge Railway Museum. The steam locomotives were replaced with a number of diesels. One of these – Ruston & Hornsby works number 175414 of 1936 – survives in preservation at the National Slate Museum in Llanberis where it carries the name Cilgwyn; it worked at Cilgwyn quarry between 1936 and 1940.

The quarry ceased to send slate via the Welsh Highland Railway in 1935 when a new road was constructed down to Talysarn. From that point all slate left the quarry by road.
