= Penrhyn quarry =

Slate quarry in north Wales

Penrhyn
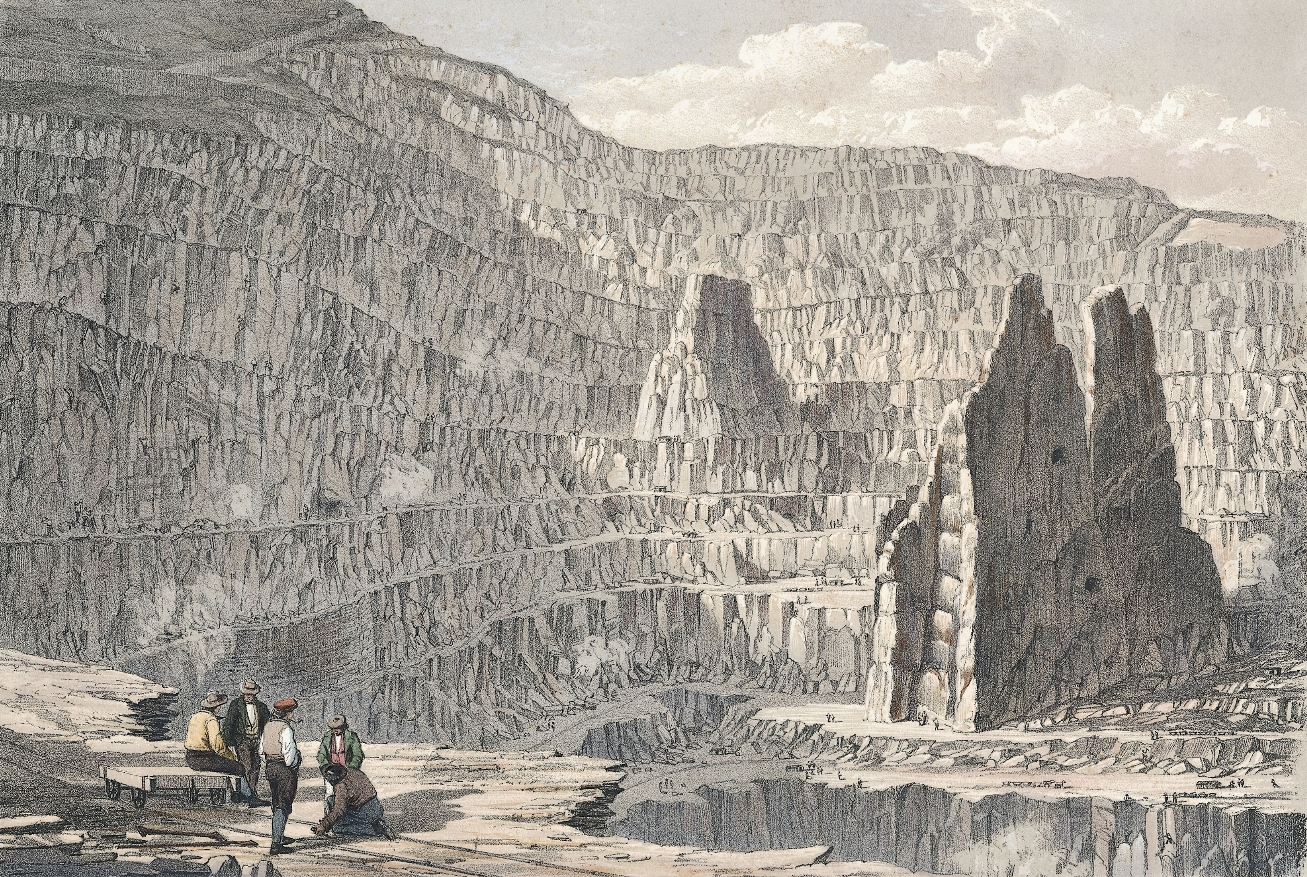
- Penrhyn Slate Quarry, in 1852

- Location in Gwynedd
- Location: near Bethesda, Gwynedd (formerly Caernarfonshire), Wales; 53.167°N 4.067°W SH 61840 65347
- Products: Slate
- Type: Quarry
- Greatest depth: 1,200 feet (370 metres)
- Opened: pre-1570
- Company: Welsh Slate Ltd.
- Website: www.welshslate.com
- Acquired: 2007

UNESCO World Heritage Site
- Part of: The Slate Landscape of Northwest Wales
- Criteria: Cultural: ii, iv
- Reference: 1633-001
- Inscription: 2021 (44th Session)
- Railways

History
- Opened: 25 June 1801
- Closed: 24 July 1962

Technical
- Track gauge: 1 ft 10 3/4 in (578 mm)

The Penrhyn quarry is a slate quarry located near Bethesda, North Wales. At the end of the nineteenth century it was the world's largest slate quarry; the main pit is nearly 1 mile (1.6 km) long and 1,200 feet (370 metres) deep, and it was worked by nearly 3,000 quarrymen. It has since been superseded in size by slate quarries in China, Spain and the USA. Penrhyn is still Britain's largest slate quarry but its workforce is now nearer 200.

== History ==
The first reference to slate extraction at Penrhyn is from 1570, when the quarry is mentioned in a Welsh poem. The quarry was developed in the 1770s by Richard Pennant, later Baron Penrhyn. Much of his early working was for local use only as no large scale transport infrastructure was developed until Pennant's involvement. From then on, slates from the quarry were transported to the sea at Port Penrhyn on the narrow gauge Penrhyn Quarry Railway built in 1798, one of the earliest railway lines. In the 19th century the Penrhyn Quarry, along with the Dinorwic quarry, dominated the Welsh slate industry.

In 1868 eighty workers were sacked for failing to vote for George Douglas-Pennant, the son of the owner, in the general election.

== The "Great Strike" ==
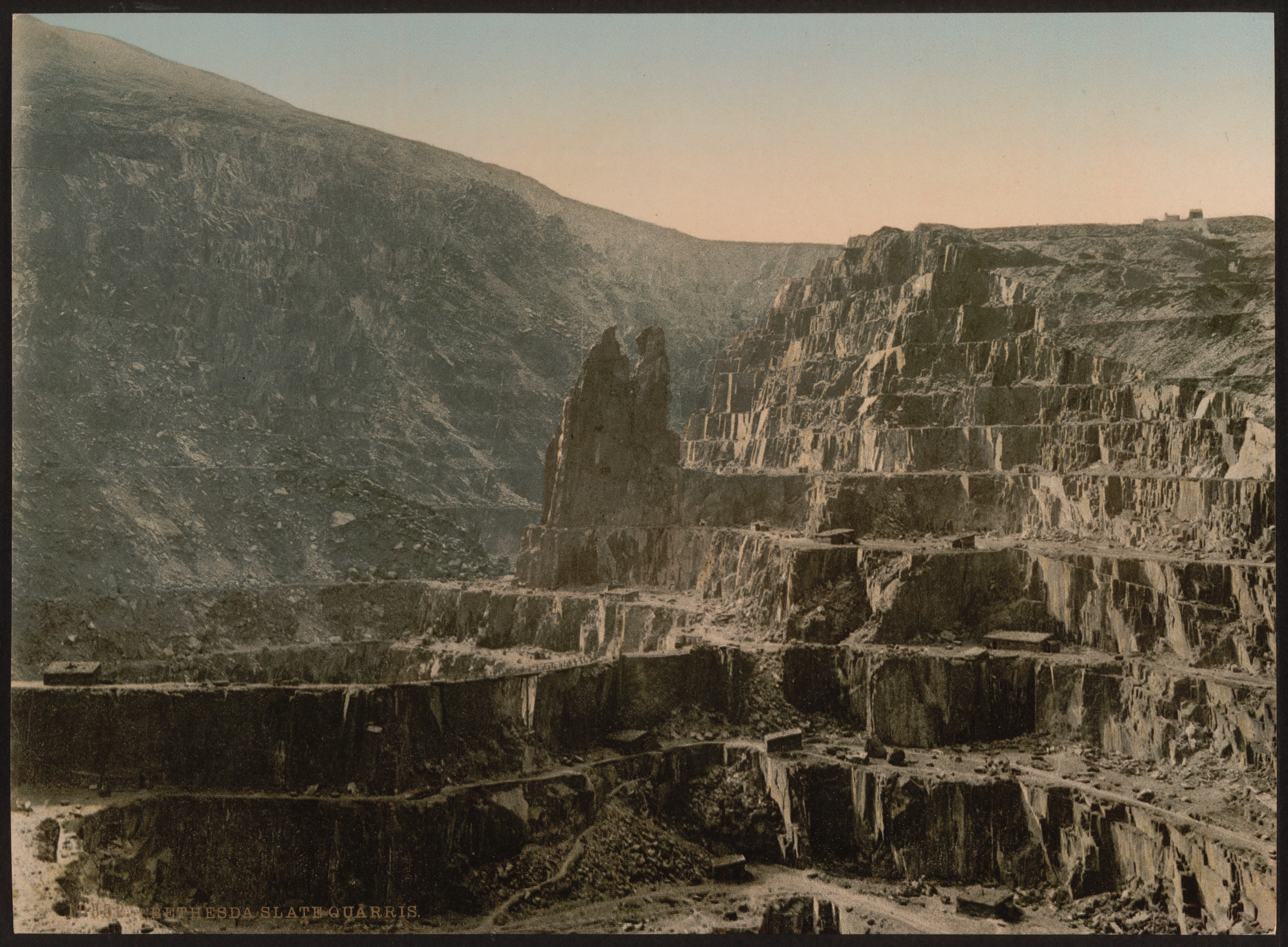
Penrhyn slate quarry, ca. 1900

The quarry is significant in the history of the British Labour Movement as the site of two prolonged strikes by workers demanding better pay and safer conditions. The first strike lasted eleven months in 1896. The second began on 22 November 1900 and lasted for three years. Known as "The Great Strike of Penrhyn", this was the longest dispute in British industrial history. During the strike, the community was divided between those who laid down their tools and those who crossed the picket line. Many locals wrote "Nid oes bradwr yn y tŷ hwn" or "There is no traitor in this house" in their front windows.

William John Parry, one of the founders of the North Wales Quarrymen's Union, and an alderman in Bethesda, organised a co-operative to take over several other local quarries and employ locked-out Penrhyn quarrymen. He eventually included Pantdreiniog, Moel Faban and Tanybwlch quarries in his operation, all on the north side of the town.

Historically, most accounts of the strike have mainly looked at its effects on male workers, owners, management, economy, and trade unions. However, modern historians are working to broaden this focus. They aim to shed light on the wider community's experiences during the strike, paying special attention to the often ignored roles and perspectives of women.

In the longer term the strike lessened confidence in the Welsh slate industry, leading to declining orders and greater unemployment.

In 2003, on the centenary of the strike, the Transport and General Workers' Union unveiled a plaque in memory of those who participated.

== Recent history ==
From 1963 until 2007 the quarry was owned and operated by Alfred McAlpine.

In 2007 it was purchased by Kevin Lagan (an Irish businessman who is the owner and chairman of the Lagan Group) and renamed Welsh Slate Ltd. Kevin Lagan and his son Peter (MD of Lagan Building Solutions Ltd) are now directors of Welsh Slate Ltd which also includes Oakeley quarry and Cwt y Bugail quarry in Blaenau Ffestiniog, and Pen-yr-Orsedd quarry in the Nantlle Valley. The Lagan Group was itself acquired by the Leicestershire-based Breedon Group in 2018.

A part of the site no longer in use for slate extraction is the site of a new adventure tourism facility operated by Zip World. The zip line Velocity 2 flies over an abandoned and partially flooded part of the quarry.

Welsh slate such as that quarried at Penrhyn was designated by the International Union of Geological Sciences as a 'Global Heritage Stone Resource' early in 2019 in recognition of its significant contribution to world architectural heritage.

In July 2021 the slate landscape of Northwest Wales, including Penrhyn quarry, was inscribed as a World Heritage Site by UNESCO.

== See also ==
- Blondin (quarry equipment) – used at Penrhyn
