= Pen-yr-Orsedd quarry =

Former slate quarry near Nantlle, in Carnarvonshire, Wales

Pen-yr-Orsedd
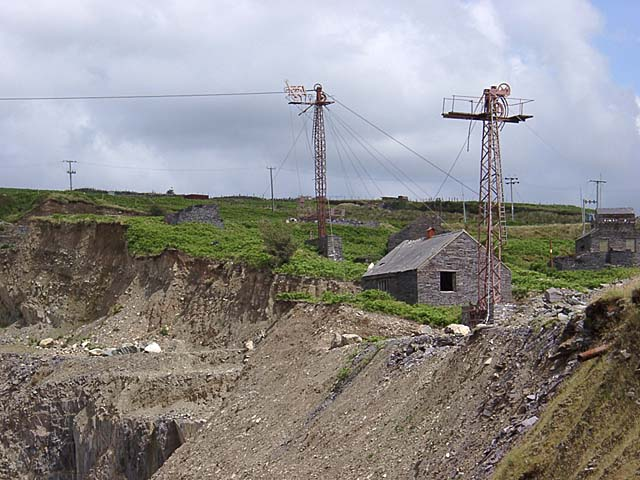
- "Blondin" aerial cableways at Pen-yr-Orsedd in 2002

- Location in Gwynedd
- Location: near Nantlle, Carnarvonshire (now Gwynedd), Wales, UK; 53°3′38″N 4°13′37″W SH 508 538
- Products: Slate
- Type: Quarry
- Closed: 1979
- Tramways

History
- Opened: 1862
- Closed: 1979

Technical
- Track gauge: 2 ft (610 mm); 3 ft 6 in (1,067 mm)

Pen-yr-Orsedd quarry was a slate quarry in the Nantlle Valley in North Wales. It was one of the last slate quarries operating in North Wales and the last operating in the Nantlle Valley area, finally closing in 1979.

== History ==
Pen-yr-Orsedd opened in 1816, owned by William Turner who was also the owner of the nearby Dorothea quarry and the Diphwys Casson quarry in Blaenau Ffestiniog. It was acquired on 1854 by John Lloyd Jones who sold it on to the Darbishire Company, owners of the Penmaenmawr granite quarries, in 1862. The new owners invested £20,000 (equivalent to £1,893,333 in 2016) to expand the quarry, though with limited results; by 1871 the quarry was producing just 500 tons per year. William Darbishire took over direct management of the quarry that year and by 1882 had raised production to almost 8,000 tons.

Pen-yr-Orsedd was one of the major slate producers of the Nantlle Valley. It was the last of the Nantlle quarries to commercially produce slate, closing in 1979.

=== Narrow-gauge railway museum ===
Railway enthusiast Rich Morris began collecting narrow gauge rolling stock in 1963, storing many at his home in Longfield in Kent. As the collection grew he sought a more permanent arrangement and in 1976, he came to an agreement with the Festiniog Slate Group to move many of his locomotives to Pen-yr-Orsedd, where he planned to set up a museum to exhibit his collection and tell the story of narrow gauge industrial railways.

With the closure of Pen-yr-Orsedd, The Festiniog Group offered Morris space for his collection at their largest quarry, Oakeley. Morris' collection was moved there in May 1978. Further collections were brought to Oakeley and the Narrow Gauge Railway Centre was opened in the Gloddfa Ganol tourist attraction.

== Tramways ==
In 1862 the quarry was connected to the Nantlle Railway, with 3 ft 6 in (1,067 mm) narrow gauge lines extended to all but the highest levels of the quarry. Most levels of the quarry had both 3 ft 6 in (1,067 mm) gauge and 2 ft (610 mm) gauge trackwork, many with mixed gauge tracks. The Nantlle Railway connection was used up until 1963, while the internal 2 ft (610 mm) gauge lines continued in limited use until the end of quarrying.

=== Locomotives ===
Name	Builder	Type	Works number	Date	Notes
Baladeulyn	De Winton	0-4-0VB			Sold to Glynrhonwy Slate Quarry in 1895
Starstone	De Winton	0-4-0VB			Thought to be sold to Glynrhonwy Slate Quarry in 1894 where it was renamed Padarn.
Inverlochy	De Winton	0-4-0VB		1877	Possible ex-Pen-y-Bryn Quarry. Scrapped 1937.
Glynllifon	De Winton	0-4-0VB		1880	Scrapped 1937
Rhymney	De Winton	0-4-0VB		1875	Scrapped before 1932
Chaloner	De Winton	0-4-0VB		1877	Sold to a private collector 1960; now preserved at the Leighton Buzzard Light Railway.
Gelli	De Winton	0-4-0VB		1893	Withdrawn 1945, still intact at quarry 1952; believed scrapped
Pendyffryn	De Winton	0-4-0VB		1894	Sold 1965, now restored to working order at the Brecon Mountain Railway
Arthur	De Winton	0-4-0VB		1895	Scrapped 1956
Victoria	De Winton	0-4-0VB		1898	Scrapped 1956
Kelso	Vulcan Foundry	0-4-0T		1893	Withdrawn 1945, still intact at quarry 1952; believed scrapped
Britomart	Hunslet	0-4-0ST	707	1899	Sold in 1965, now privately owned and running on the Ffestiniog Railway
Sybil	Hunslet	0-4-0ST	827	1903	Sold in 1965, now privately owned, and restored to working order at the Brecon Mountain Railway alongside Pendyffryn
Una	Hunslet	0-4-0ST	873	1905	Sold in 1963. Now in working order at the Welsh Slate Museum, Llanberis
Diana	Kerr Stuart	0-4-0T	1158	1909	ex-Oakeley Slate Quarry, Blaenau Ffestiniog. Privately owned, and based in 2018 on the Amerton Railway
No. 1	Ruston & Hornsby	4wDM	235712	1945	20DL. Out of use in 1972.
No. 1	Ruston & Hornsby	4wDM	226298	1945	20DL. Out of use in 1972.
No. 2	Ruston & Hornsby	4wDM	235711	1945	
No. 3	Ruston & Hornsby	4wDM	226298	1943	
No. 4	Ruston & Hornsby	4wDM	226264	1943	20DL. Out-of-use in the top level of the quarry in 1972.
		4wPM			Sold or scrapped

== See also ==
- British narrow gauge slate railways
