= Dorothea quarry =

Former slate quarry near Nantlle, in Carnarvonshire, Wales

Dorothea
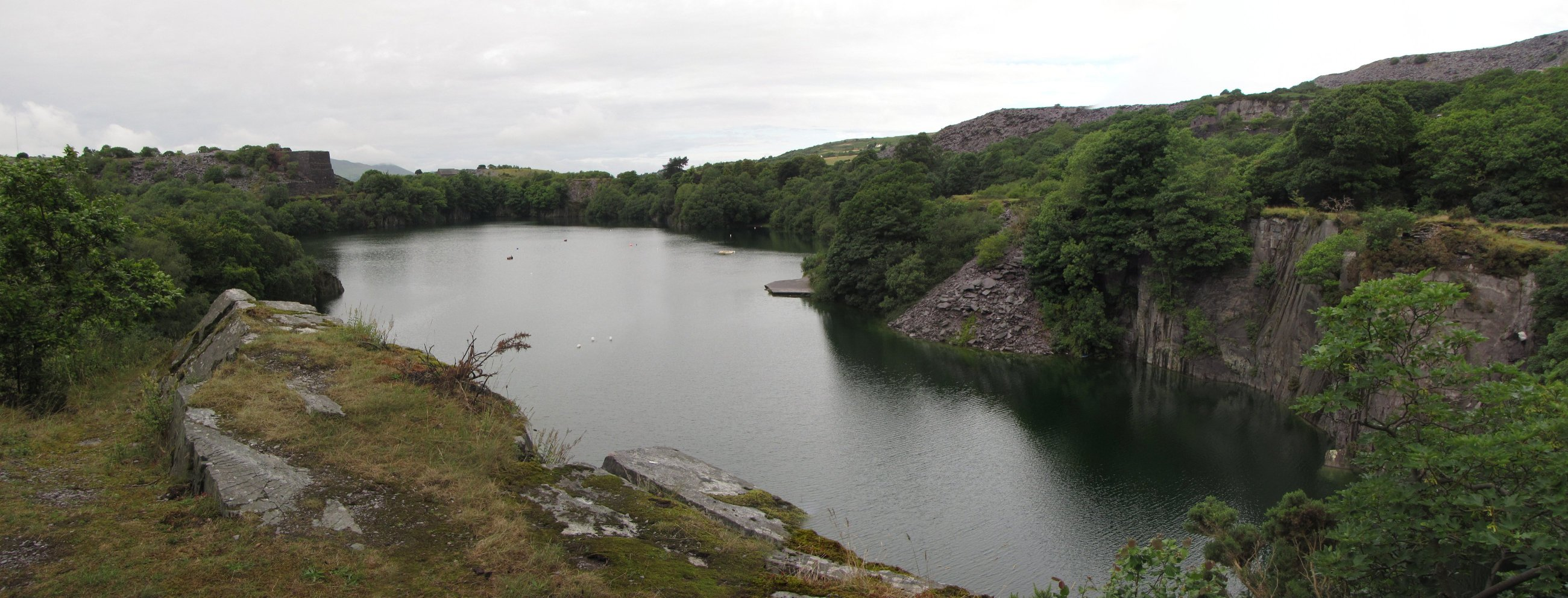
- A flooded pit in the quarry in July 2010

- Location in Gwynedd
- Location: near Talysarn, Carnarvonshire (now Gwynedd), Wales; 53°1′30″N 4°17′0″W SH 518 503
- Products: Slate
- Type: Quarry
- Opened: 1820s
- Closed: 1970

Dorothea quarry is a disused slate quarry in the Nantlle Valley area in North Wales. It covers a large area near the village of Talysarn and contains three flooded deep lakes.

== History ==
=== Turner family ===
The quarry commenced working in the early 1820s, though there were a number of smaller workings on or near the site before this. About 1829 it was leased by William Turner who named the workings Cloddfa Turner. In the 1830s the quarry was generating £2000 profits per year (£199,239.26 in 2025). Turner's son took over as manager and renamed the quarry Dorothea, apparently after the wife of the landowner Richard Garnons. Profits began to fall in the 1840s, and in April 1848 the quarry was put up for sale, with 22 years remaining on the lease.

=== Local ownership ===
It was the largest quarry in the area, employing 200 men and producing 5,000-6,000 tons of finished slate a year. A group of quarrymen led by John Robinson, William Owen and John Jones purchased Dorothea from Turner for £3,000 (£311,442.43 in Aug 25). They renewed the lease of the quarry in June 1851. The quarry was put up for sale again in 1864, at which time production was given at 1,000 tons per month. No buyer was found, instead John Williams of Denbighshire gradually bought out many of the existing shareholders, and by 1879 he had amassed more than 70% of the shares.

Production peaked in 1872 at 17,442 tons, though 1875 was the most profitable year, generating £14,738 (£1,483,175.72 in 2025). In the 1930s over 350 men were employed at Dorothea. Production dropped significantly after the start of World War II and the quarry closed in 1970.

=== After closure ===
Since quarrying ended in 1970, the Dorothea quarry was flooded and become a popular site for scuba diving, even though there were no facilities provided and the landowner did not officially approve the activity. The unregulated nature and depth of the site encouraged some divers to overestimate their capabilities, and in the decade 1994–2004, 21 divers lost their lives in the quarry. The British Sub Aqua Club advised members not to dive there for many years.

Diving was eventually resumed in 2021, under license from the landowner, through the North Wales Technical Divers club. The quarry is extremely deep (over 100m) and requires a high standard of diver training. As such access is strictly limited to those with appropriate qualifications.

== Description ==
The quarry sits at the bottom of the wide Nantlle valley and consists of six pits, the deepest dropping 106m from the surface. The slate veins here run vertically, allowing unusually deep vertical pits to be dug. Because the pits fall below the water table they needed to be constantly pumped to stay dry. A Cornish beam engine was installed in 1904 to pump the pits; it stayed in use until 1951 when it was replaced with electric pumps. This was the last new Cornish engine to be built. (Note: Another engine was installed later at Hodbarrow Mine, Cumberland, but this was an older engine, re-located.) It remains in situ in its Grade I listed engine house.

== Transport ==
The quarry was one of the first users of the 3 ft 6 in (1,067 mm) Nantlle Railway in 1828. It later developed an extensive internal tramway system of 2 ft (610 mm) gauge. Dorothea was one of the first users of De Winton locomotives in 1869.

=== Locomotives ===
2 ft (610 mm) gauge locomotives known to have worked at Dorothea.

Name	Builder	Works No.	Date built	Type	Notes
	De Winton		c1869	0-4-0VB	Scrapped by 1914
Glyn	De Winton		1874	0-4-0VB	Scrapped by 1914
Dorothea	Hunslet	763	1901	0-4-0ST	Worked until 1942. Now preserved on the Launceston Steam Railway
Wendy	W.G. Bagnall	2091	1919	0-4-0ST	Purchased from the Votty & Bowydd Quarry in Blaenau Ffestiniog in 1930. Preserved by the Hampshire Narrow Gauge Railway Trust and donated by them to the Statfold Barn Railway
	Deutz		1926	4wPM	Purchased from the Votty & Bowydd quarry in March 1930. Believed scrapped.
	Lister	33527		4wPM	Out of use in October 1960. Scrapped in 1964.
	Lister	3916		4wPM	ex-Tarmac Limited contract in Wolverhampton. Out of use by 1964.
	Lister	3950		4wPM	ex-Tarmac Limited contract in Wolverhampton. Out of use by October 1960. Scrapped in 1964.
