= Bryngwyn railway station =

Disused railway station in Wales

Bryngwyn

General information
- Location: Bryngwyn Station, Gwynedd; Wales
- Coordinates: 53.07966°N 4.23319°W
- Platforms: 1

Other information
- Status: Disused

Key dates
- 1877: Opened
- 1 Jan 1914: Closed for passenger trains
- 26 Sept 1936: Closed completely
Location

Bryngwyn railway station is a former station which was the terminus for passengers on the Bryngwyn Branch of the North Wales Narrow Gauge Railways, and later the Welsh Highland Railway. Beyond the station, an incline climbed the slope of Moel Tryfan to serve a series of slate quarries. Those connected by tramways to the incline head included the Alexandra quarry, Moel Tryfan quarry, Fron quarry, Braich quarry and Cilgwyn quarry.

== History ==
At Bryngwyn a 1 in 10 balanced incline owned by the Welsh Highland Railway led to an upper plateau from where quarry owned lines radiated to several slate quarries in the Moel Tryfan and Nantlle area. Although slate traffic continued as required until final closure in 1936, passenger trains ceased to operate on the branch in 1914.

There is very little left of the original Bryngwyn station today, which would have stood in the middle of fields near a farm where the station takes its name. The station consisted of a typical North Wales Narrow Gauge Railway station building, signal box, and a siding connecting to a goods shed. Beyond the station the line was connected to the Slate Quarries of Moel Tryfan.

== Status ==
The trackbed of line from Tryfan Junction to Bryngwyn has been purchased by the Ffestiniog Railway Co., but there are no immediate plans to re-open it. In 2011 the trackbed became a public footpath, although with conditions that this will not impede reopening of the branch line in the future.

The Station name board is preserved in the Talyllyn Narrow Gauge Railway Museum in Tywyn.

| Preceding station | Historical railways | Following station |
|---|---|---|
| Terminus | Welsh Highland Railway | Rhostryfan |
