= Groeslon railway station =

Former railway station in Gwynedd, Wales

Groeslon
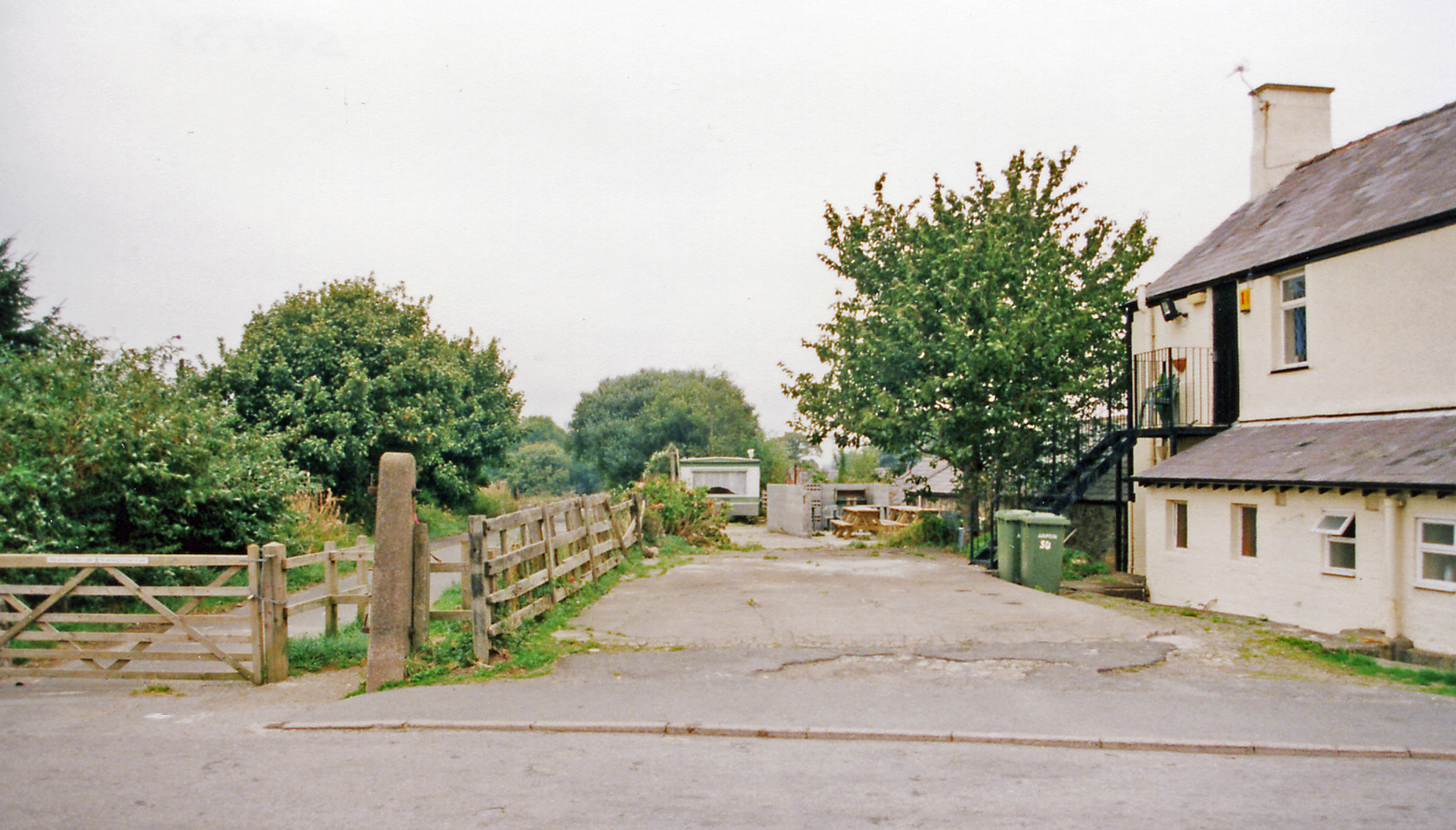
- Remains of the station in 1999

General information
- Location: Gwynedd; Wales
- Coordinates: 53.0787°N 4.2811°W
- Grid reference: SH 473 559
- Platforms: 2

Other information
- Status: Disused

History
- Original company: Nantlle Railway; Caernarvonshire Railway
- Pre-grouping: London and North Western Railway
- Post-grouping: London, Midland and Scottish Railway

Key dates
- 1856: Opened
- 12 June 1865: Closed
- 2 September 1867: Reopened by the Carnarvonshire Railway
- 7 December 1964: Closed
Location

Groeslon railway station served the village of Groeslon, Gwynedd, Wales. It operated first as part of the Nantlle Tramway and afterwards as a railway under the auspices of several different companies. The station and line closed on 7 December 1964 as recommended in the Beeching Report.

== History ==
A halt was located at the same site for the horse drawn Nantlle Tramway, which was originally used purely for transportation of goods from the quarries in the Nantlle Valley to the harbour at Caernarfon. Passenger services were introduced on 11 August 1856, which ran until 12 June 1865.From the outset timetables appeared regularly in the "Carnarvon & Denbigh Herald" and in Bradshaw from October 1856. The Carnarvonshire Railway took over services from the Nantlle Tramway a month later, but in most cases relocated the track. One of the exceptions was at Groeslon where the existing layout was maintained.

The services under the new railway opened on 2 September 1867, and the local village gradually built up around the station. Initially the station was served by trains running between Afon Wen and Caernarvon railway stations; as there was no passing loop, all trains had to go through the station although not all stopped there. The London and North Western Railway took over all services of the Caernarfon Railway in 1870, including those passing through Groeslon. Services were expanded in 1871 with the start of passenger services on the Caernarvon Town line, and by 1895 some 12 trains were arriving at Groeslon per day.

A passing loop and additional platform were added in 1911. On 1 January 1923, services were taken over by the London, Midland and Scottish Railway. Further modifications to the layout took place in 1947, the loop and platforms were extended to accommodate longer trains. As lorries, buses and cars became more readily available, the use of the station gradually decreased. The report by Richard Beeching recommended the closure of the line through Groeslon. In the resultant Beeching cuts, Groeslon stopped receiving goods via railway on 4 May 1964, and closed completely on 7 December 1964.

== Further material ==
- Clemens, Jim (2003) [1959-67]. North Wales Steam Lines No. 6 (DVD). Uffington, Shropshire: B&R Video Productions. BRVP No 79.
- Dunn, J.M. (September 1958). Cooke, B.W.C. (ed.). "The Afonwen Line-1". The Railway Magazine. 104 (689). London: Tothill Press Limited. ISSN 0033-8923.
- Smith, Martin, ed. (May 2011). "The Nantlle Tramway". Railway Bylines. Vol. 16, no. 6. Clophill, Bedfordshire: Irwell Press. pp. 306–313. ISSN 1360-2098.

Preceding station	Disused railways	Following station
Llanwnda; Line and station closed	Carnarvonshire Railway	Penygroes; Line and station closed
Pwllheli Road; Line and station closed	Nantlle Railway	Penygroes; Line and station closed
