= Lôn Goed =

Lane in Eifionydd, Gwynedd

Coordinates: 52.9133°N 4.3221°W

Lôn Goed (Welsh for 'Tree Lane'), also known as Y Lôn Goed, is a rural lane in Eifionydd, Gwynedd, Wales. The lane is lined with trees, mainly oak and beech. It was celebrated by the poet R. Williams Parry (1884–1956) in his Welsh-language poem Eifionydd.

Lôn Goed starts in the hamlet of Afon Wen, on the A497 main road about half a mile to the south of Chwilog and halfway between Criccieth and Pwllheli. Afon Wen lies on a river of the same name, near where it reaches the sea. The lane runs for about five miles (8 km), at first north-east then in a northerly direction, from Afon Wen to Hendre Cennin on the slopes of Mynydd Cennin. The lane is used as a footpath, other than a short section that follows a minor road.

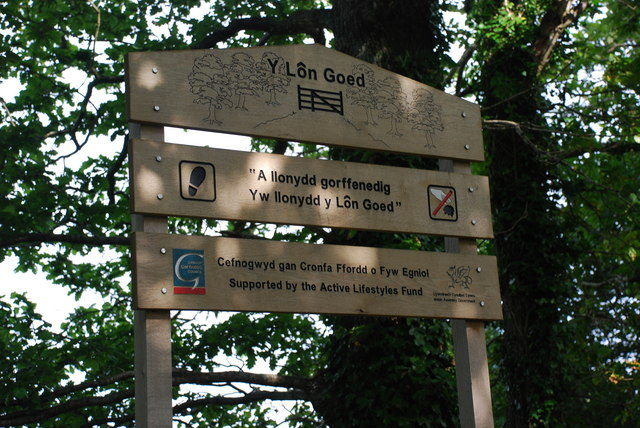
Y Lôn Goed information signpost

== History ==
The lane is also referred to locally as Lôn Môn, a corruption of the name Maughan, named after John Maughan, steward of Plas Hen (now Talhenbont) near Llanystumdwy, who helped rebuild the path with trees to help the water drainage system between 1819 and 1828.

The lane was developed for the carriage of lime, coal and peat to the farms of the Talhenbont estate, from materials landed from ships on the beach at Afon Wen. The use of the lane for transporting goods ended in the late 1800s after the opening of the Carnarvonshire Railway in 1862 between Brynkir railway station (Bryncir) and the Afon Wen railway station. The railway allowed goods to be transported by train instead of by horse and cart.

In 1977–78, a Government employment scheme run by Gwynedd County Council's countryside service managed the trees along Lôn Goed.

Lôn Goed through four seasons

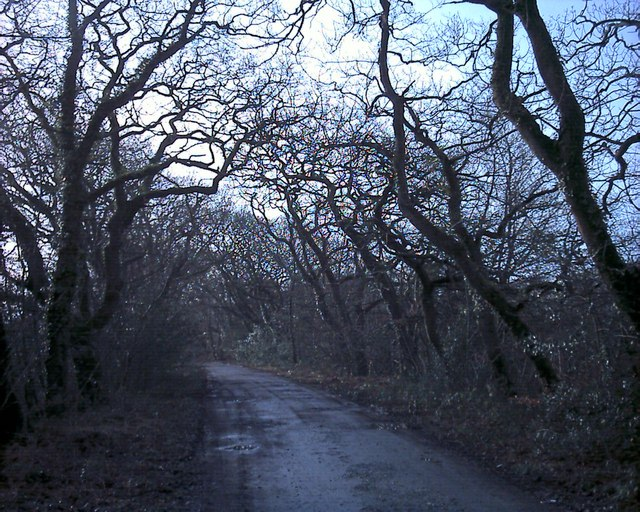
Winter

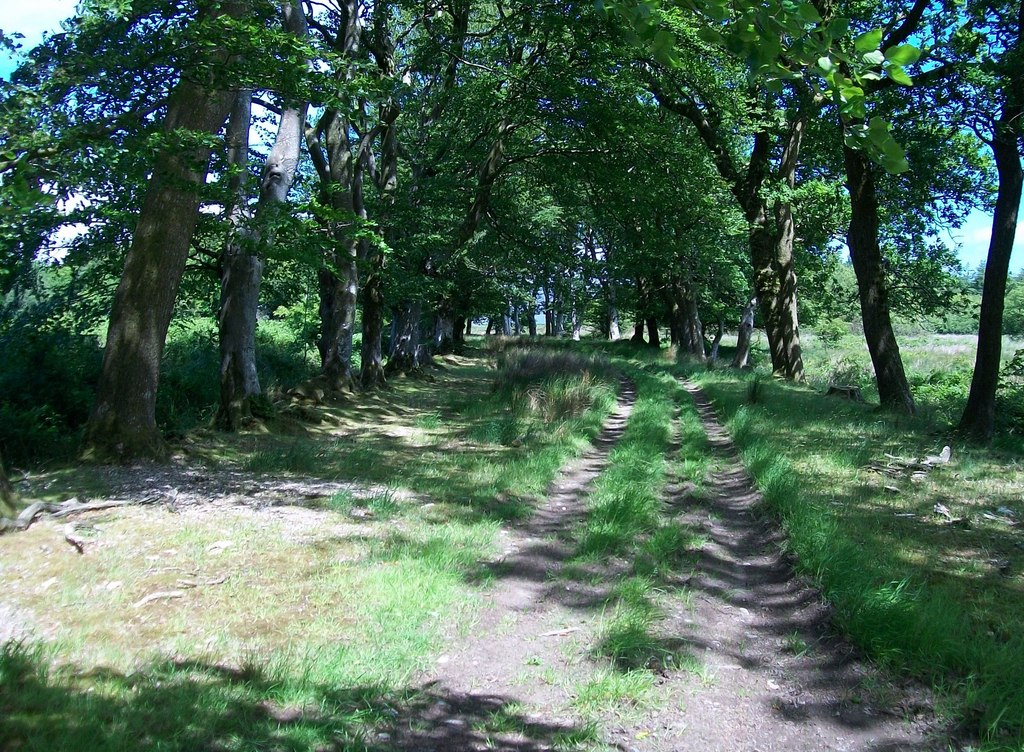
Spring

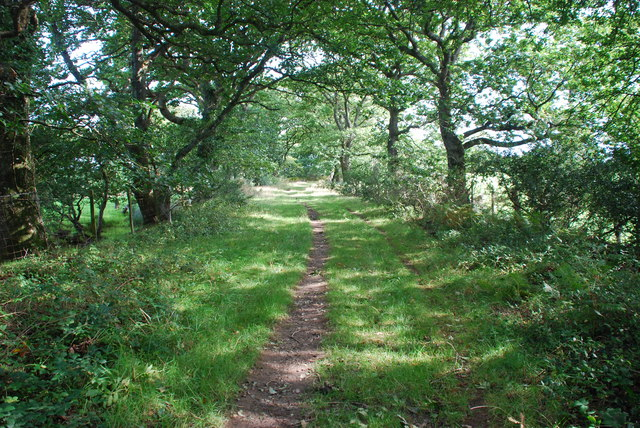
Summer

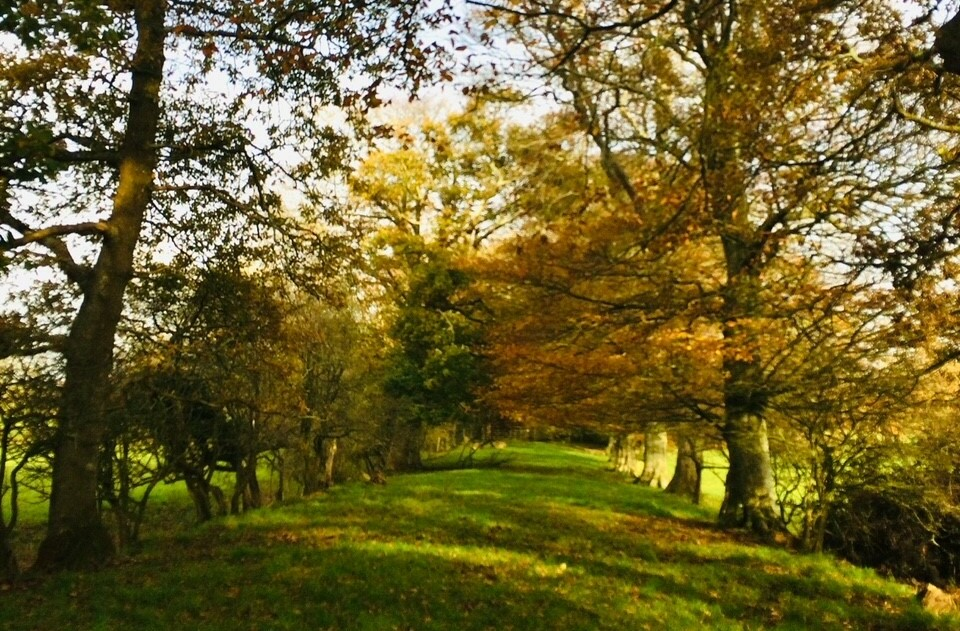
Autumn

== National Eisteddfod 2023 ==
In February 2014, Storm Darwin made landfall in Gwynedd, after causing a record amount of damage in Ireland. The storm felled an 200-year-old oak tree on Lôn Goed, a piece of which donated by a local farmer to make the bardic chair for the 2023 National Eisteddfod of Wales in nearby Boduan. The chair was made by the sculptor Stephen Faherty, who formed it by carving the entire piece of oak, instead of the usual method of cutting up and jointing the wood. The chair was won by the poet Alan Llwyd.

Lôn Goed was the inspiration for the design of the bardic crown created by jeweller Elin Mair Roberts, which was awarded at the 2023 National Eisteddfod.

== Literary references ==
R. Williams Parry's poem Eifionydd includes the couplet:

A llonydd gorffenedig
Yw llonydd y Lôn Goed

A perfected, accomplished quiet
Is the quiet of Lôn Goed

The literary editor Meic Stephens described Parry's poem as one of the most famous in the Welsh language, and as expressing the poet's love for the countryside of Eifionydd, and for Lôn Goed in particular, contrasting them with the quarrying district of the Nantlle Valley. In the 1970s the Welsh Arts Council published a poster of the poem that was illustrated by a painting of a wooded lane by Sue Shields; this has since been republished.

The Eifionydd writer J. G. Williams refers to Lôn Goed in his work, including in his book Pigau'r Sêr.

== See also ==
- Lôn Eifion, a cycle route that passes near the northern end of Lôn Goed
