= Penygroes railway station =

Former railway station in Gwynedd, Wales

Penygroes
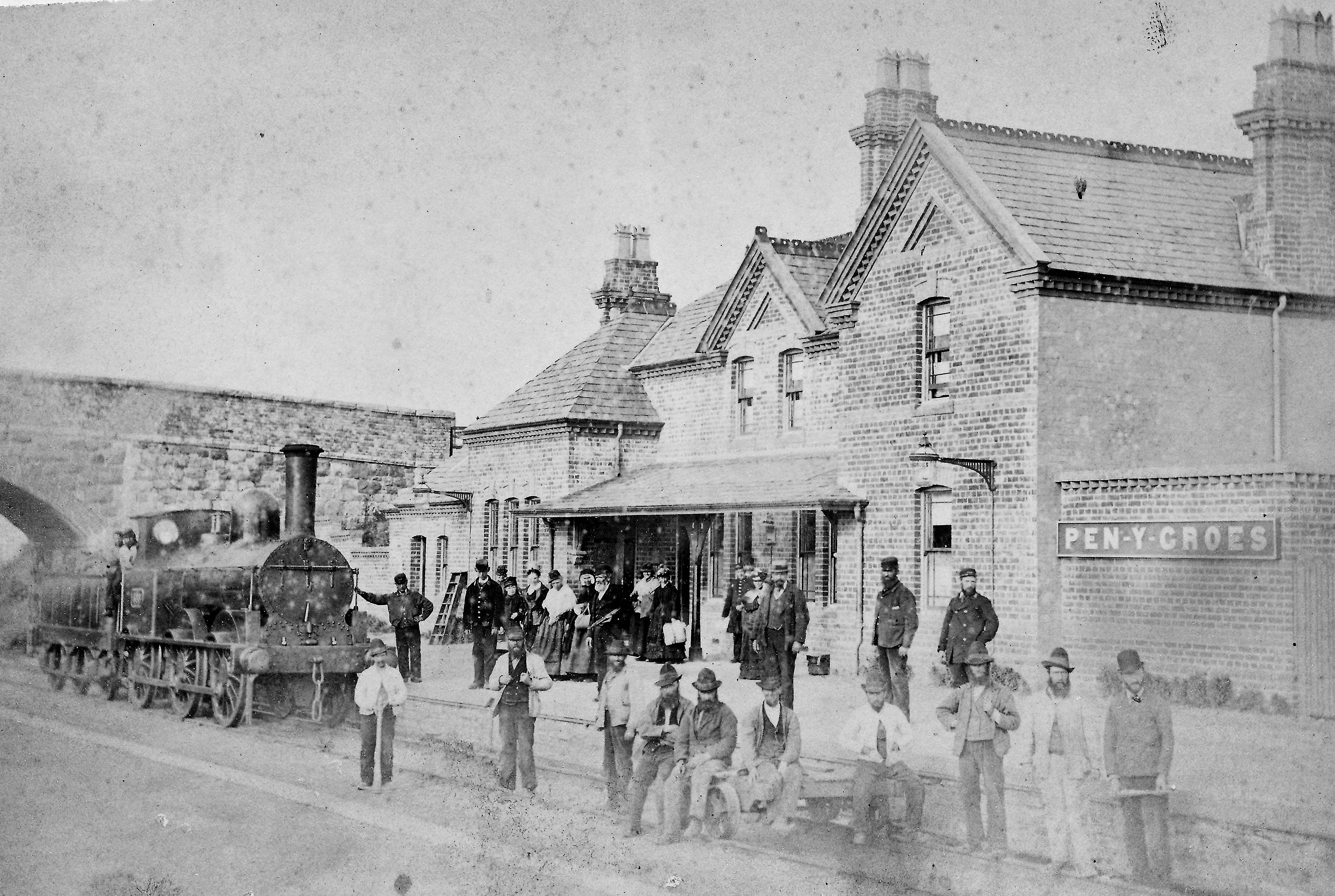
- Circa. 1875

General information
- Location: Gwynedd; Wales
- Coordinates: 53.0524°N 4.2886°W
- Grid reference: SH 466 530
- Platforms: 2 plus bay

Other information
- Status: Disused

History
- Original company: Nantlle Railway; Caernarvonshire Railway
- Pre-grouping: London and North Western Railway
- Post-grouping: London, Midland and Scottish Railway

Key dates
- 11 August 1856: Opened by the Nantlle Railway
- 12 June 1865: Closed
- 2 September 1867: Reopened by the Carnarvonshire Railway as "Pen-y-Groes"
- 1904: Renamed "Penygroes"
- 7 December 1964: Closed
Location

Penygroes railway station was located in Penygroes, Gwynedd, Wales.

The narrow gauge, horse-drawn Nantlle Railway had a station near the site from 1856. From the outset timetables appeared regularly in the "Carnarvon & Denbigh Herald" and in Bradshaw from October 1856. In 1865 the narrow gauge line was closed, to be replaced and updated to standard gauge with contemporary facilities. It reopened in its eventual form in 1867 and closed in December 1964. The station served as the junction station for the short branch to Nantlle which was overlain in 1872 on part of the former Nantlle Railway route, but its main purpose was for traffic on the former Carnarvonshire Railway line from Caernarvon to Afon Wen and beyond.

When the line and station were first opened in 1867 a locomotive was hired from the Cambrian Railways. A Cambrian driver, who had never been over the line before, was retained to drive the first directors' inspection special from Afon Wen to Carnarvon (Pant). On the return journey the loco ran short of coal and ran out of steam at Penygroes. There was some peat in a nearby field, which the crew dug and the directors carried to the engine enabling steam to be raised.

The passenger service along the Nantlle Branch was withdrawn in 1932, though excursions continued until 1939. The station and line closed on 7 December 1964 as recommended in the Beeching Report. The station building and footbridge remained in place, but increasingly derelict, until at least 1970.

Preceding station	Historical railways	Following station
Groeslon; Line and Station closed	Carnarvonshire Railway	Pant Glas; Line and Station closed
Terminus	Carnarvonshire Railway; Nantlle Branch	Nantlle; Line and Station closed

== Further material ==
- Clemens, Jim (2003) [1959-67]. North Wales Steam Lines No. 6 (DVD). Uffington, Shropshire: B&R Video Productions. BRVP No 79.
- Smith, Martin, ed. (May 2011). "The Nantlle Tramway". Railway Bylines. Vol. 16, no. 6. Clophill, Bedfordshire: Irwell Press. pp. 306–313. ISSN 1360-2098.
