= Pant Glas =

Coordinates: 53.001°N 4.278°W

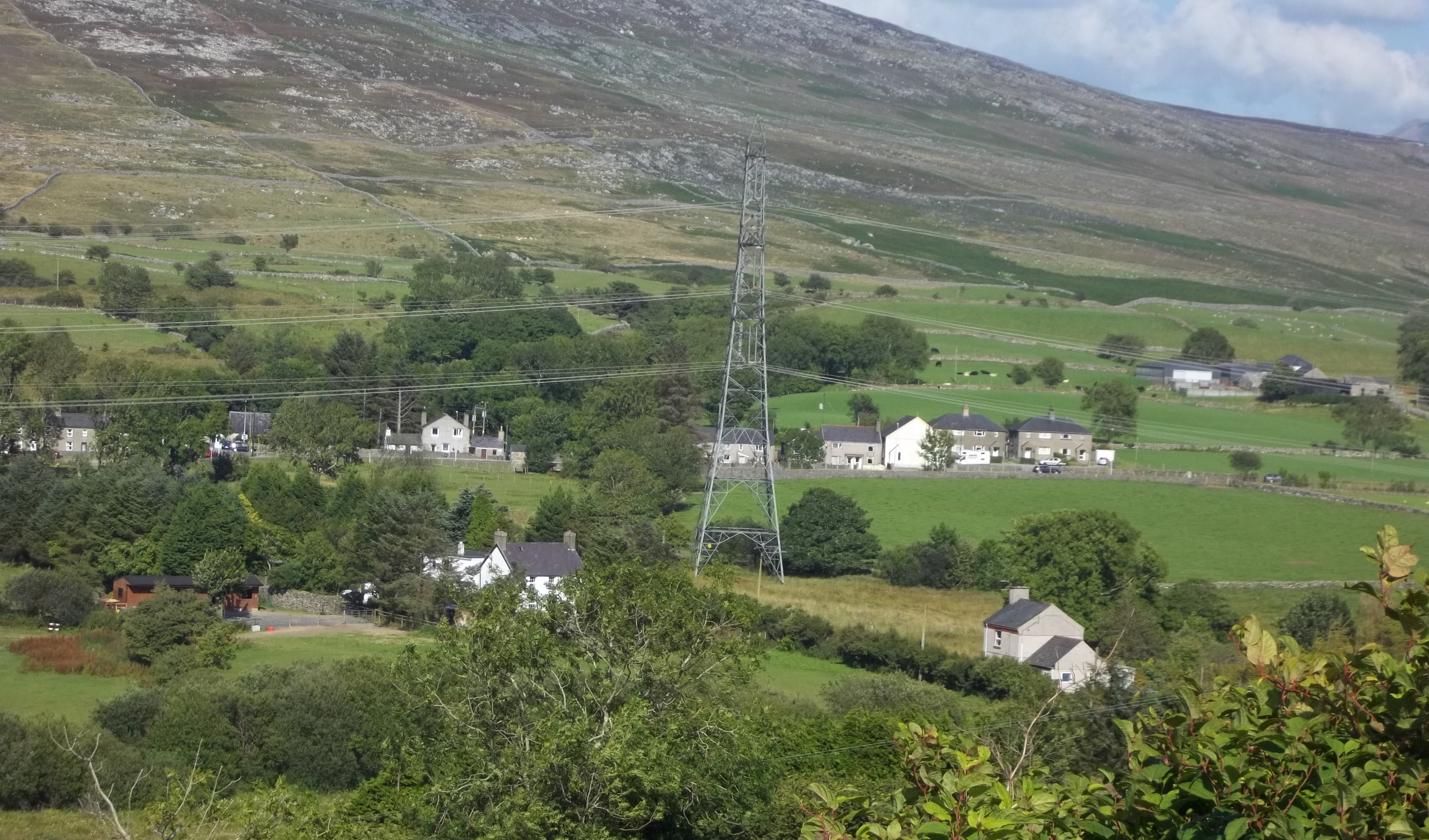
- The hamlet from the west

- Location within Gwynedd
- OS grid reference: SH471473
- Community: Clynnog
- Principal area: Gwynedd
- Country: Wales
- Sovereign state: United Kingdom
- Post town: GARNDOLBENMAEN
- Postcode district: LL51
- Dialling code: 01766
- Police: North Wales
- Fire: North Wales
- Ambulance: Welsh
- UK Parliament: Dwyfor Meirionnydd
- Senedd Cymru – Welsh Parliament: Dwyfor Meirionnydd

Pant Glas (Welsh for 'green hollow'; as in other Celtic languages, "glas" may mean both 'green' and 'blue') is a hamlet on the A487 road in Gwynedd, Wales, in the community of Clynnog. Historically in Caernarfonshire, it lies approximately 10 miles (16 km) south of Caernarfon, 9 miles (14 km) north-west of Porthmadog, and 10 miles (16 km) north-east of Pwllheli.

Nearby is the former Pant Glas railway station on the closed Carnarvonshire Railway. The station closed in January 1957, and the railway closed in 1964 and has since been replaced with the Lôn Eifion cycle track. Also nearby is the Arfon transmitting station, the tallest structure in Wales.

Welsh opera singer Sir Bryn Terfel was brought up at Fferm Nant Cyll Ucha, just outside the hamlet.

In February 2005, the speed limit for the A487 through Pant Glas was reduced from 50 mph (80 km/h) to 40 mph (64 km/h).
