= Afon Wen =

Hamlet in Gwynedd, Wales

Coordinates: 52.912°N 4.324°W

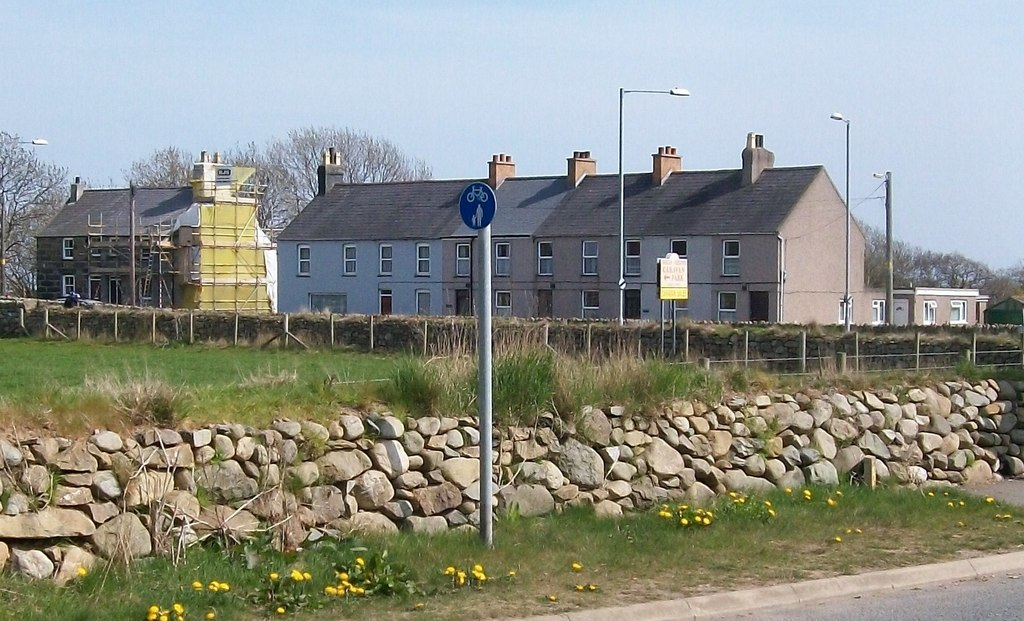
- Afon-wen Terrace, Afon Wen

- Location within Gwynedd
- OS grid reference: SH473375
- Community: Llanystumdwy
- Principal area: Gwynedd
- Country: Wales
- Sovereign state: United Kingdom
- Post town: PWLLHELI
- Postcode district: LL53
- Dialling code: 01766
- Police: North Wales
- Fire: North Wales
- Ambulance: Welsh
- UK Parliament: Dwyfor Meirionnydd
- Senedd Cymru – Welsh Parliament: Gwynedd Maldwyn

Afon Wen is a small hamlet on the Llŷn peninsula in the Welsh principal area of Gwynedd.

== Location ==
It is located at the mouth of the Afon Wen river, half a mile from the village of Chwilog and midway between Pwllheli and Cricieth.

== History and amenities ==
Afon Wen railway station was formerly a junction station on the Cambrian Coast Line, from where a connection could be made via the Carnarvonshire Railway (later LNWR and LMS) to the north coast at Caernarfon. For many people the name of the place is synonymous with that line, as in the song Trên i Afon Wen by Welsh pop star Bryn Fôn. The line was closed in 1964, and the track lifted. Part of the line, from Caernarfon to Dinas, is now part of the route of the newly re-opened Welsh Highland Railway.

The section from Caernarfon to Bryncir has been converted into a footpath/cycleway that forms part of the National Cycle Network Route 8 (NCN8) and is known as Lôn Eifion.

Lôn Goed is a rural lane used as a footpath, running about five miles (8 km) from Afon Wen to Hendre Cennin. It is celebrated by the poet R. Williams Parry (1884–1956) in his Welsh-language poem Eifionydd. Lôn Goed was developed between 1819 and 1828 for the carriage of lime, coal and peat to the farms of the Talhenbont estate, from materials landed from ships on the beach at Afon Wen.
