= IFOR (disambiguation) =

IFOR was the Implementation Force, a NATO-led multinational peace enforcement force in Bosnia and Herzegovina.

IFOR may also refer to:

- International Fellowship of Reconciliation
- Ifor, a given name

== See also ==
- IFORS, International Federation of Operational Research Societies
