= Llanwnda railway station =

Former railway station in Wales

Llanwnda

General information
- Location: Llanwnda, Gwynedd; Wales
- Coordinates: 53.0948°N 4.2822°W
- Grid reference: SH 472 576
- Platforms: 1

Other information
- Status: Disused

History
- Original company: Carnarvonshire Railway
- Pre-grouping: London and North Western Railway
- Post-grouping: LMSR

Key dates
- 2 September 1867: Opened as "Pwllheli Road"
- 14 September 1877: Renamed Llanwnda
- 7 December 1964: Closed completely
Location

Llanwnda railway station served the village of Llanwnda, Gwynedd, Wales.

== History ==
A halt named Pwllheli Road existed here on the horse-drawn Nantlle Railway from 1856 to 12 June 1865.From the outset timetables appeared regularly in the "Carnarvon & Denbigh Herald" and in Bradshaw from October 1856. It was obliterated when the standard gauge railway and station were built.

The station opened on 2 September 1867, also as "Pwllheli Road". It was renamed "Llanwnda" in 1877 and closed with the line in December 1964.

When the Penygroes By-pass was built in 1999–2000 the site of the station was obliterated by a roundabout where the A487 and A499 meet.

| Preceding station | Historical railways | Following station |
|---|---|---|
| Dinas; Station open, line closed | Carnarvonshire Railway | Groeslon; Line and station closed |
| Bontnewydd; Line and station closed | Nantlle Railway | Groeslon; Line and station closed |

== Further material ==
- Clemens, Jim (2003) [1959-67]. North Wales Steam Lines No. 6 (DVD). Uffington, Shropshire: B&R Video Productions. BRVP No 79.
- Dunn, J.M. (September 1958). Cooke, B.W.C. (ed.). "The Afonwen Line-1". The Railway Magazine. 104 (689). London: Tothill Press Limited. ISSN 0033-8923.
- Smith, Martin, ed. (May 2011). "The Nantlle Tramway". Railway Bylines. Vol. 16, no. 6. Clophill, Bedfordshire: Irwell Press. pp. 306–313. ISSN 1360-2098.
