= Nantlle Railway =

Welsh railway

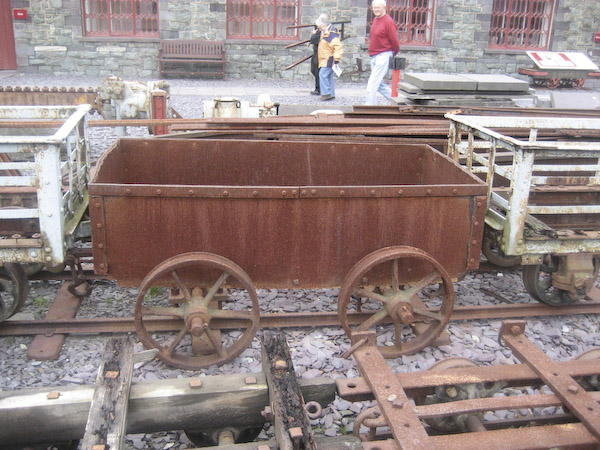
- Horse-drawn slate wagon used on the Tramway, now preserved at the Welsh Slate Museum, Llanberis

Overview
- Headquarters: Penygroes
- Locale: Wales
- Dates of operation: 1828–1865
- Successor: Carnarvonshire Railway

Technical
- Track gauge: 3 ft 6 in (1,067 mm) and 4 ft 8 1/2 in (1,435 mm)

The Nantlle Railway (or Nantlle Tramway) was a Welsh narrow gauge railway. It was built to carry slate from several slate quarries across the Nantlle Valley to the harbour at Caernarfon for export by sea. The line provided a passenger service between Caernarfon and Talysarn from 1856 to 1865. It was the first public railway to be operated in North Wales.

A tramway linking the Nantlle slate quarries to Caernarfon was proposed in the 1810s. The Nantlle Railway was authorised by an act of Parliament in May 1825, and the company began construction of the railway. The line was designed and constructed by George Stephenson and his son, Robert. The line opened in 1828 and was operated using horses.

During the 1860s and 1870s, a portion of the line was replaced by the standard gauge branch of the London and North Western Railway (LNWR) which acquired the line in the late 1860s. The Nantlle Railway was closed in 1963 by British Railways (BR), when it was the last line to be operated by BR using horse traction. Much of the route has been overlaid with roads or obliterated by other developments, but several railway structures remain. Two miles of the northern section of the original Nantlle Railway trackbed, between Dinas and the Coed Helen Lane tunnel, are part of the reopened Welsh Highland Railway, although much is off line as was the Carnarvonshire Railway route on which the restored WHR was constructed.

== History ==
=== Background ===
The first proposals for a railway in the Nantlle Valley were made during 1813. Slate quarries had developed to north and west of Nantlle, and the slate was transported to wharves at Caernarfon by pack horse. A more efficient system was required to enable the quarries to compete with Dinorwic and Penrhyn.

A 9 miles (14 km) route for the line was surveyed, running westwards from tramways linked to the quarries, towards Talysarn and Penygroes. The line then turned northwards, passing through Groeslon, Llanwnda, Dinas and Bontnewydd. The line was also carried copper from the mine at Drws-y-coed, to the east of Nantlle.

Nantlle Railway Act 1825
- Act of Parliament
- Parliament of the United Kingdom
- Long title: An Act for making and maintaining a Railway or Tram Road from or near a certain Slate Quarry called Gloddfarlon, in the Parish of Llandwrog, in the County of Carnarvon, to the Town and Port of Carnarvon, in the same County.
- Citation: 6 Geo. 4. c. lxiii

Dates
- Royal assent: 20 May 1825

Text of statute as originally enacted

The Nantlle Railway Act 1825 (6 Geo. 4. c. lxiii) was passed on 20 May 1825. The Nantlle Railway Company was incorporated in June 1825 to construct and operate the railway, and in August 1825 it advertised for a sub-contractor to build the line. The company raised a working capital of £20,000 by issuing shares at £100 each. Most of the shareholders were owners of the quarries served by the line. The chief engineer was the railway pioneer George Stephenson, and construction was overseen by his son Robert, who was assisted by John Gillespie.

The line was run as a toll road with customers charged a fee for their goods to be hauled to their destination.

=== Construction ===
Nantlle Railway Act 1827
- Act of Parliament
- Parliament of the United Kingdom
- Long title: An Act for enabling the Company of Proprietors of the Nantlle Railway to raise a further Sum of Money, for completing the said Railway and other Works.
- Citation: 7 & 8 Geo. 4. c. iii

Dates
- Royal assent: 21 March 1827

Text of statute as originally enacted

Nantlle Railway Act 1828
- Act of Parliament
- Parliament of the United Kingdom
- Long title: An Act for extending the Time for completing the Nantlle Railway and other Works connected therewith, in the County of Carnarvon.
- Citation: 9 Geo. 4. c. lxii

Dates
- Royal assent: 23 May 1828

Text of statute as originally enacted

On 21 March 1827, a second act of Parliament, the Nantlle Railway Act 1827 (7 & 8 Geo. 4. c. iii), was passed, authorising an additional £70,000 of shares to finance construction. The act mortgaged the railway's infrastructure, and restricted the fees it could charge until all debts were paid. On 23 May 1828, in response to slower than expected progress, a third act, the Nantlle Railway Act 1828 (9 Geo. 4. c. lxii) was passed extending by five years the time available for construction. Robert Williams of Bangor was appointed the resident engineer and William Owen of Gwaenfynydd, Anglesey was contracted to construct the railway.

The railway required significant civil engineering work, including a 400 feet (120 m) long embankment and culvert to the west of Bontnewydd, two tunnels, and a bridge. The short Coed Helen Tunnel carried the line underneath a road on a gentle gradient, rising from north to south. Its walls and roof were built of coursed blocks up to 4 feet (1.2 m) long. The line crossed under the driveway of Plas Dinas house in the 150 feet (46 m) long Plas Dinas Tunnel. It was 8 feet (2.4 m) wide and had a semi-circular arched roof, 6 feet (1.8 m) high, made of three rings of brick, supported on walls of stone rubble. The Plas Dinas Tunnel is approached by a pair of 35 feet (11 m) deep cuttings.

The Afon Gwyrfai Bridge is 50 feet (15 m) long with a single arch that carried the railway over the Afon Gwyrfai to the west of Bontnewydd. It is 20 feet (6.1 m) wide at its base, narrowing towards the crown and 18 feet (5.5 m) above water level. It is built from rusticated stone blocks. In September 1999, the Afon Gwyrfai Bridge was listed as a Grade II structure.

The track was laid with lightweight wrought iron fish-bellied rails to 3 ft 6 in (1,067 mm), significantly wider than the 2 ft (610 mm) gauge found on contemporary quarry railways, and narrower than the 4 ft 8 1/2 in (1,435 mm) which became the standard gauge.

The Nantlle Railway was single track throughout, with 22 passing loops but without any signals. Trains ran from one passing place to the next using line of sight to ensure safe working. This led to disputes when trains met between passing loops. Trains typically consisted of four or five wagons, pulled by a single horse travelling at walking pace of around 3 miles per hour (4.8 km/h).

=== Ownership changes and later use ===
The Nantlle Railway was acquired by the Carnarvonshire Railway. On 25 July 1867, the line from Pant on the southern edge of Caernarfon at Coed Helen, to Tyddyn Bengam, north of Penygroes, was replaced by a single-track standard-gauge line. The Carnarvonshire Railway ran trains from Caernarfon to Afon Wen.

In July 1870, the Carnarvonshire Railway and the remaining narrow-gauge section of the Nantlle Railway was acquired by the London and North Western Railway (LNWR).

This left 3 ft 6 in (1,067 mm) gauge sections at the north and south ends of the line, with 5 miles (8.0 km) of standard gauge in the middle. Slates were loaded onto narrow gauge wagons near the quarries and drawn by horses to Tyddyn Bengam, where the narrow gauge wagons and their contents were loaded onto standard-gauge transporter wagons, three at a time. North of Pant, the narrow gauge wagons were unloaded onto the narrow-gauge tracks and hauled by horses along the last 50 chains (1.0 km) to the quayside at Caernarfon Harbour. This process was slow, costly.

In 1870, the LNWR extended the standard gauge line north from Pant to Caernarfon Station where it met a branch built from Bangor in 1852. In December 1871, the standard gauge tracks were extended onto the quayside, removing the need for transhipment and the isolated Caernarfon section of the Nantlle was abandoned. That same year, the LNWR built a short branch from Penygroes to a new station at Talysarn, named Nantlle. This was built partly on a new alignment and partly over the narrow gauge tracks. Extensive transshipment yards were laid out at 'Nantlle' where slate arriving on the narrow-gauge was loaded into standard-gauge wagons.

The remaining approximately 2 miles (3.2 km) of 3 ft 6 in (1,067 mm) gauge horse-drawn tramway linked Nantlle with the quarries to the west and north. It was operated by the LNWR until 1923 when it was absorbed into the London Midland and Scottish Railway (LMS). From 1948, the line was owned and operated by British Railways (BR).

In its final years, the line attracted enthusiasts' railtours. When the Ffestiniog Railway celebrated its Centenary of Steam on 22 May 1963, a Nantlle horse and handler hauled a demonstration train at Porthmadog.

The railway was closed in 1963, when the branch to which it was connected was shut. The last recorded use of horses by BR was on the Nantlle railway.

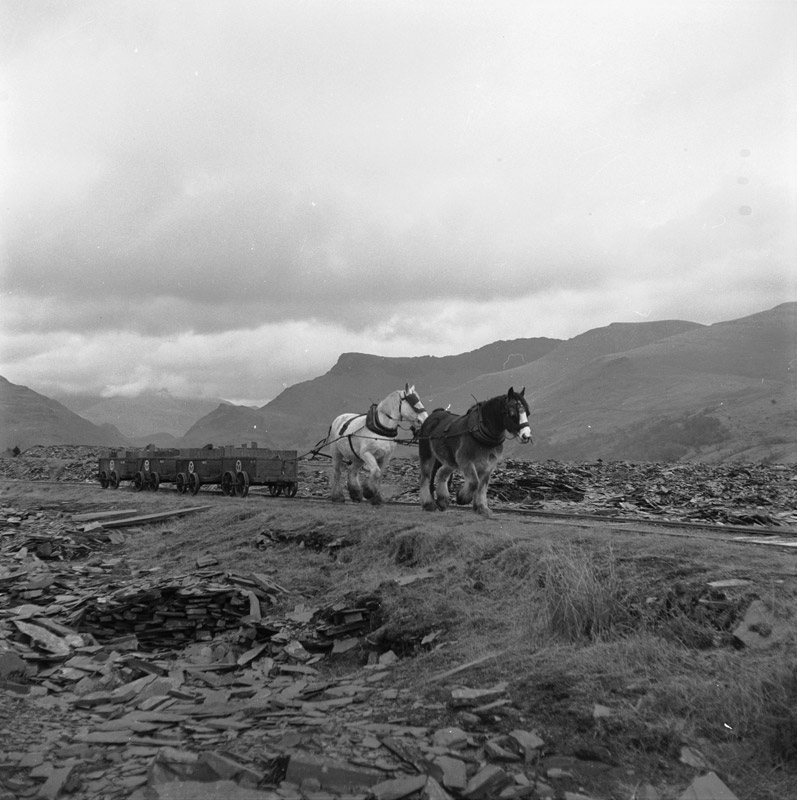
The horse drawn train at Dyffryn Nantlle in 1959

== Rolling stock ==
The narrow gauge line was a wagonway constructed to a gauge of 3 ft 6 in (1,067 mm) and equipped with four wheeled wagons fitted with double-flanged wheels, which were loose on fixed axles. In later years many wagons had extended axles which protruded beyond the wheels. Some wagons had eyes bolted to the tops of their sides to enable them to be lifted bodily by the Blondins used in some of the quarries. The wagons were owned by the tramway, rather than the quarries and the many that survived into BR ownership had narrow steel plate bodies, which were mounted between the wheels and bolted to the axles. Their shape and structure appears to have changed little from the railway's earliest years.

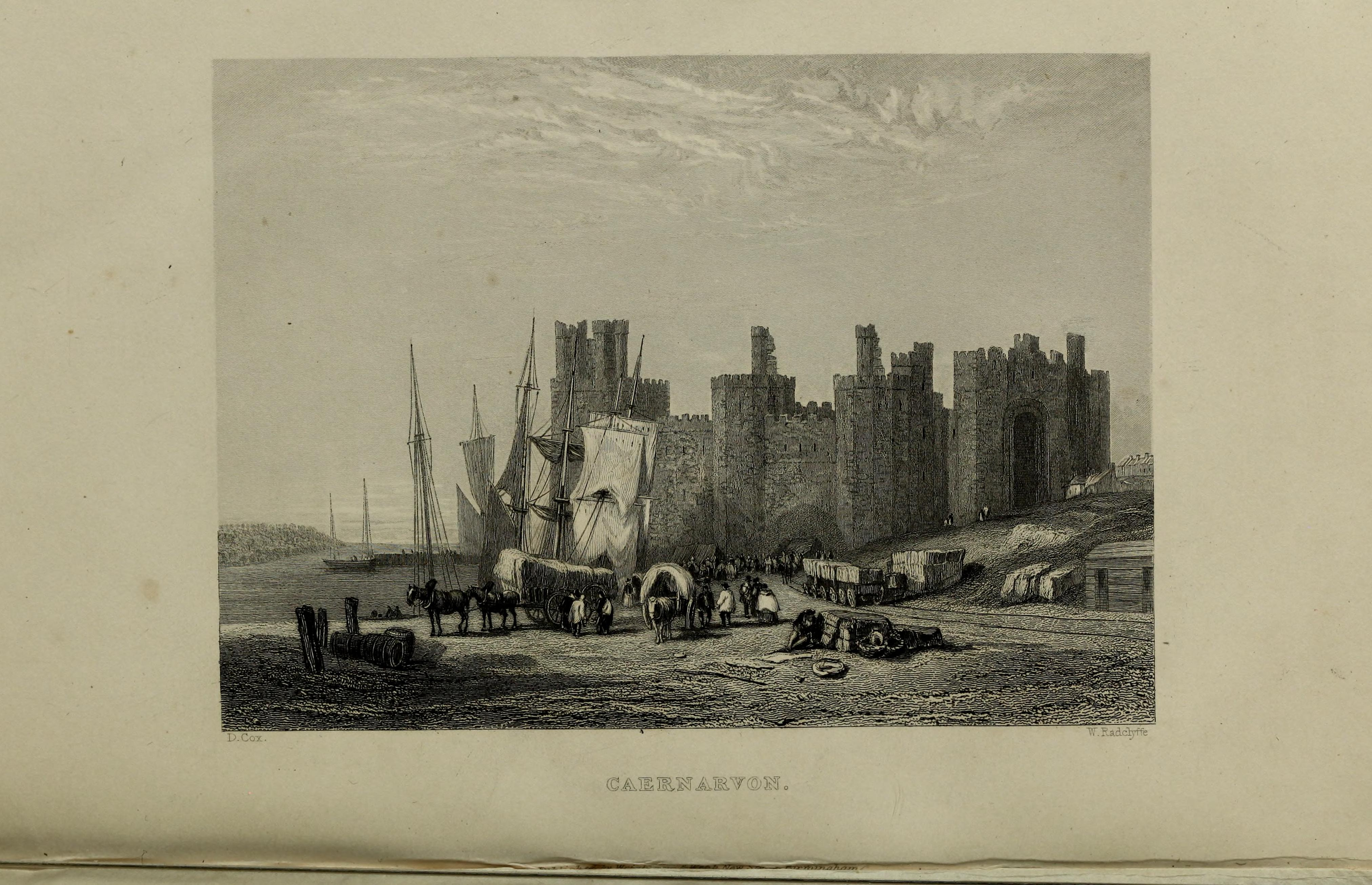
Caernarfon slate quay with loaded wagons and slate stacks

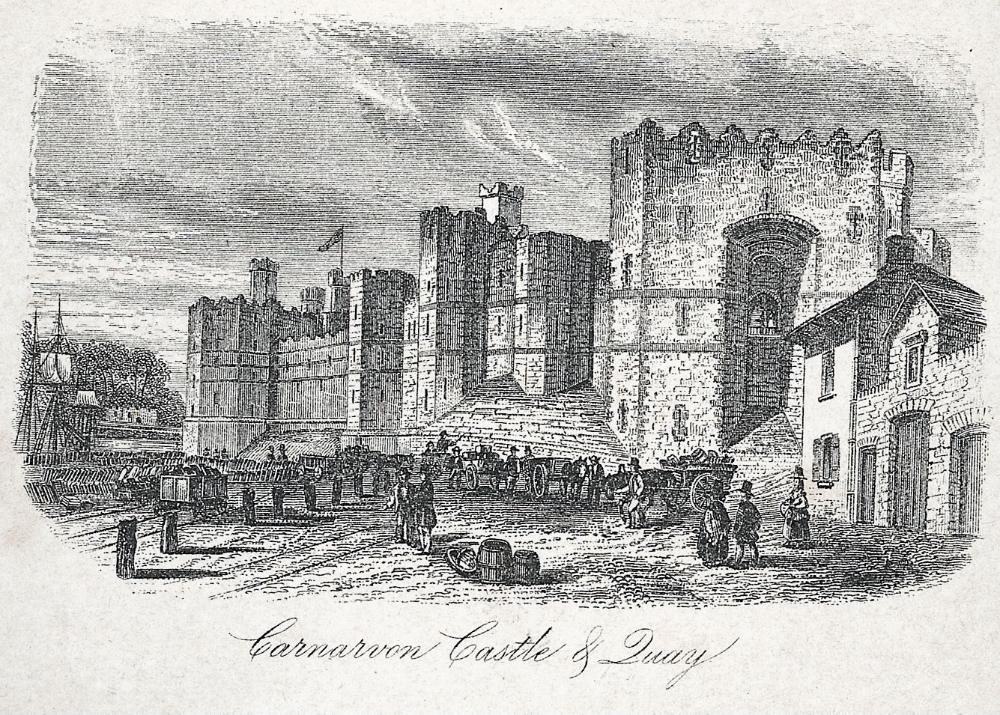
Caernarfon slate quay with a loaded wagon and stacks of slates

== Modern times ==
Two miles (3.2 km) of the northern section of the original Nantlle Railway trackbed, between Dinas and the Afon Seiont, now is part of the reopened Welsh Highland Railway. Much of the route has been built over, but in 2016 the remains of three significant Nantlle Railway structures could still be found:

- a tunnel at Coed Helen, just visible from passing Welsh Highland Railway trains
- a bridge near Bontnewydd
- a tunnel at Plas Dinas

== See also ==
- Welsh Highland Railway
- British industrial narrow gauge railways
