= Llangybi railway station =

Llangybi railway station may refer to:

- Llangybi railway station (Ceredigion), on the Carmarthen—Aberystwyth line in mid Wales
- Llangybi railway station (Gwynedd), on the Carnarvonshire Railway in north Wales
