= Lôn Eifion =

Section of the Welsh National Cycle Route

Coordinates: 53.145°N 4.269°W

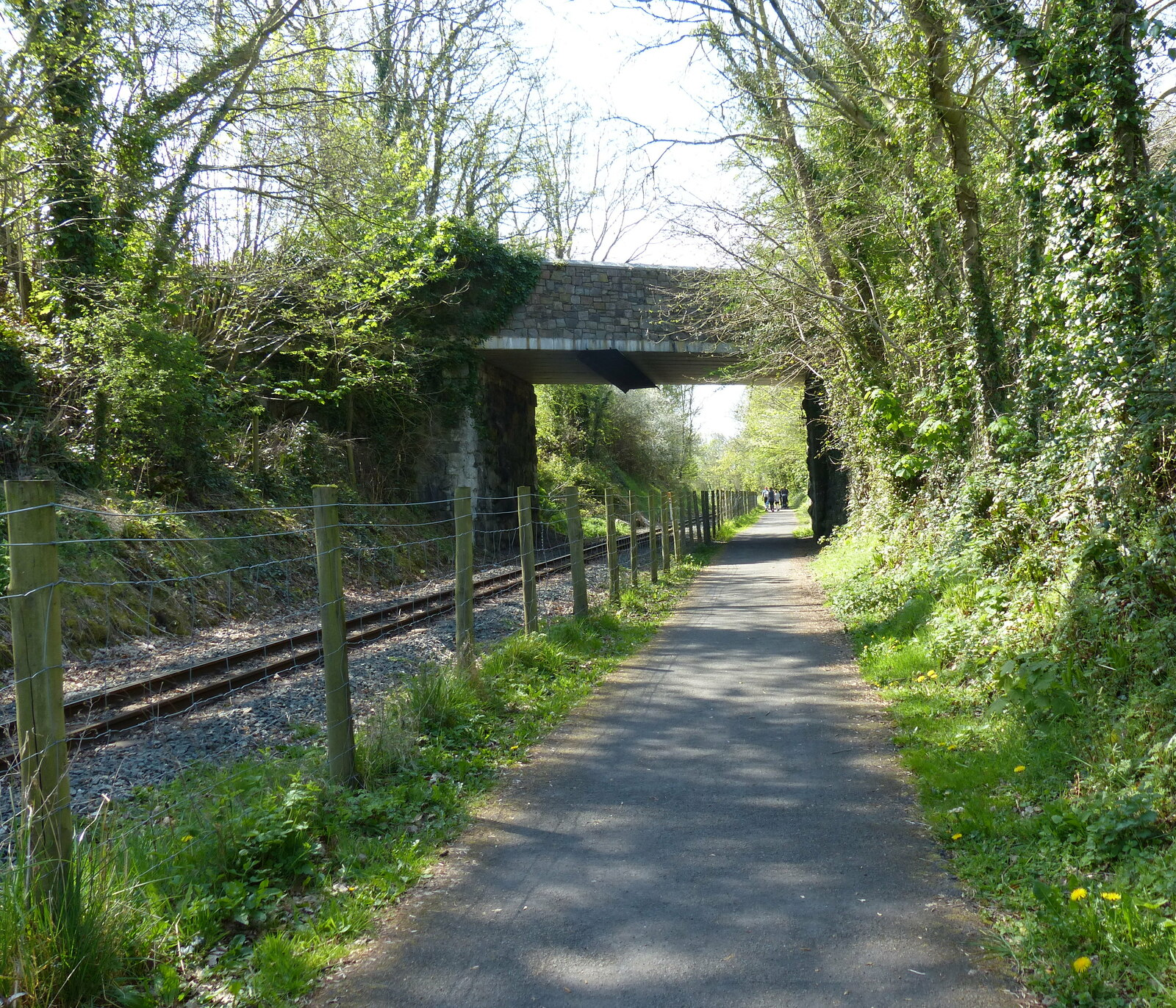
Lôn Eifion route next to the Welsh Highland Railway

Lôn Eifion is a cycle route in Gwynedd, Wales. It is 20 km (12 miles) long and runs from Caernarfon to Bryncir. The entire route is traffic-free and it forms part of part of Lôn Las Cymru (National Cycle Route 8).

== History ==
Lôn Eifion runs along most of the former Carnarvonshire Railway route, which linked Caernarfon to Afon Wen on the Cambrian Coast Line. The railway closed in December 1964 and the trackbed between the Afon Seiont and Afon Wen was bought by Carnarvonshire County Council in 1968, later passing to Gwynedd Council on its creation in 1974. In 1976 a tarmac road was built on the section between Llanwnda and Cefn Graianog for use by lorries taking aggregates from a nearby quarry to the construction of Dinorwig Power Station. When this use ended in 1983 the tarmac road became a cycle route, and a new surface was also provided over the section from Caernarfon to Llanwnda.

== Route ==
From Caernarfon to Dinas the Lôn Eifion runs alongside the Welsh Highland Railway, which since reopening in 1997 has also used the former Carnarvonshire Railway trackbed. From Dinas the route continues southwards, passing the Inigo Jones Slate Works at Groeslon, to its highest point at Penygroes. The southern end of the route is at the site of the former Brynkir railway station, where the platforms and water tower can still be seen and there is a small car park. National Cycle Route 8 continues from Bryncir on minor roads towards Criccieth. Walkers can take the Lôn Goed path from near Bryncir to the coast at Afon Wen.

== See also ==
- Rail trail
