= Ynys railway station =

Former railway station in Wales

Ynys

General information
- Location: Criccieth, Gwynedd, Gwynedd; Wales
- Coordinates: 52.9526°N 4.2844°W
- Grid reference: SH 466 419
- Platforms: 1

Other information
- Status: Disused

History
- Original company: London and North Western Railway
- Post-grouping: London, Midland and Scottish Railway; Western Region of British Railways

Key dates
- July 1872: Opened
- 7 December 1964: Closed
Location

Ynys was a railway station opened in 1872 by the LNWR next to a level crossing in a small hamlet north of Criccieth, Gwynedd. It closed in December 1964 as recommended in the Beeching Report.

Preceding station	Historical railways	Following station
Brynkir; Line and Station closed	Carnarvonshire Railway	Llangybi; Line and Station closed

== Further material ==
- Clemens, Jim (2003) [1959–67]. North Wales Steam Lines No. 6 (DVD). Uffington, Shropshire: B&R Video Productions. BRVP No 79.
- Dunn, J.M. (September 1958). Cooke, B.W.C. (ed.). "The Afonwen Line-1". The Railway Magazine. 104 (689). London: Tothill Press Limited. ISSN 0033-8923.
