= Bontnewydd railway station =

Railway halt on the Welsh Highland Railway, Wales

Bontnewydd
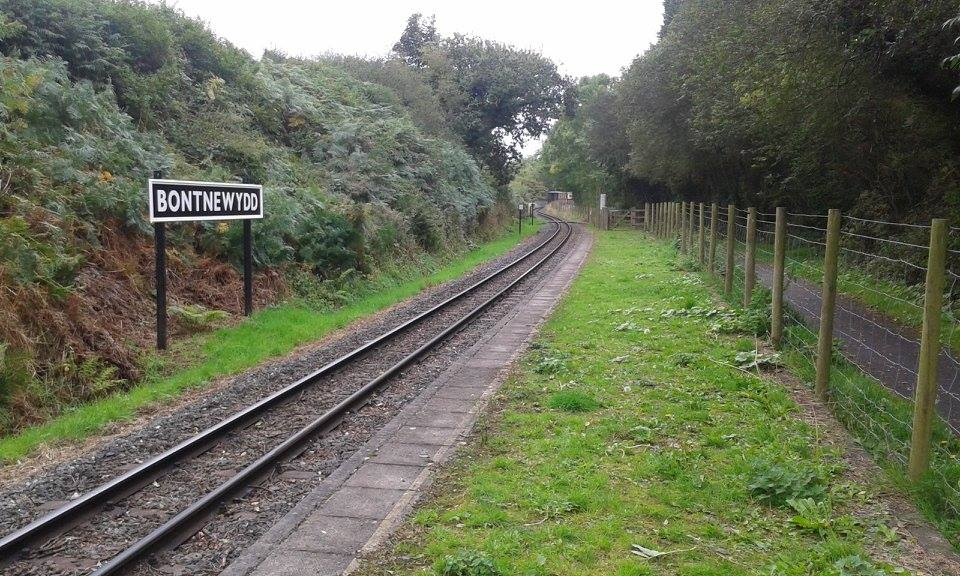
- The station in September 2015

General information
- Location: Bontnewydd, Gwynedd; Wales
- Coordinates: 53.11597°N 4.27478°W
- Grid reference: SH478600
- System: Station on heritage railway
- Owner: Ffestiniog Railway Company
- Manager: Welsh Highland Railway
- Platforms: 1
Location

Bontnewydd is an unstaffed halt on the narrow gauge Welsh Highland Railway. The halt was opened on 31 May 1999 on the petition of the villagers of Bontnewydd, and is between Caernarfon and Dinas on the Lôn Eifion cycle route. It is a request stop with no station buildings and a single low platform. The train services are operated by the Ffestiniog Railway Company.

== See also ==
A halt existed here on the horse-drawn Nantlle Railway from 1856 to 12 June 1865. From the outset timetables appeared regularly in the Carnarvon & Denbigh Herald and in Bradshaw from October 1856.

== Sources ==
- Boyd, James I.C. (1990) [1972]. Narrow Gauge Railways in North Caernarvonshire, Volume 1: The West. Headington: The Oakwood Press. ISBN 978-0-85361-273-5. OCLC 650247345.
- Butt, R. V. J. (October 1995). The Directory of Railway Stations: details every public and private passenger station, halt, platform and stopping place, past and present (1st ed.). Sparkford: Patrick Stephens Ltd. ISBN 978-1-85260-508-7. OCLC 60251199. OL 11956311M.

Preceding station	Heritage railways	Following station
Caernarfon Terminus	Welsh Highland Railway	Dinas towards Porthmadog Harbour
Historical railways
Carnarvon Castle; Line and station closed	Nantlle Railway	Pwllheli Road; Line and station closed
