= Pant Glas railway station =

Former railway station in Wales

Pant Glas
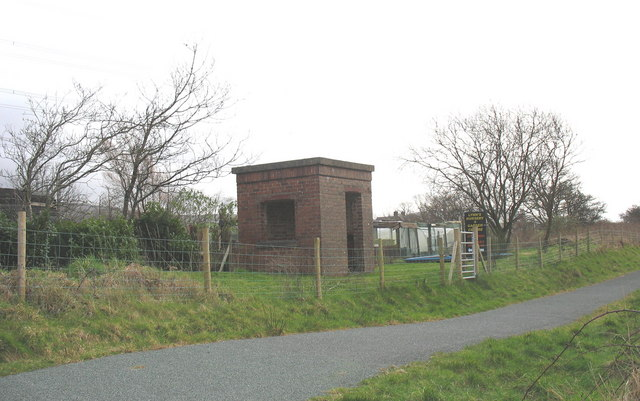
- Remains of the station in 1999

General information
- Location: Gwynedd; Wales
- Coordinates: 53.0001°N 4.2828°W
- Grid reference: SH 468 471
- Platforms: 1

Other information
- Status: Disused

History
- Original company: London and North Western Railway
- Post-grouping: London, Midland and Scottish Railway

Key dates
- June 1872: Opened as "Pant Glas Siding"
- 1912: Renamed "Pant Glas"
- 7 January 1957: Closed
Location

Pant Glas was a railway station opened by the LNWR in Pant Glas, Gwynedd, Wales, serving a sparsely populated rural area. Custom was never heavy, leading to goods services being withdrawn in 1952 and the station being closed in 1957, though traffic continued to pass through until the line closed on 7 December 1964 as recommended in the Beeching Report.

== Further material ==
- Clemens, Jim (2003) [1959-67]. North Wales Steam Lines No. 6 (DVD). Uffington, Shropshire: B&R Video Productions. BRVP No 79.
- Dunn, J.M. (September 1958). Cooke, B.W.C. (ed.). "The Afonwen Line-1". The Railway Magazine. 104 (689). London: Tothill Press Limited.

Preceding station	Historical railways	Following station
Penygroes; Line and Station closed	Carnarvonshire Railway	Brynkir; Line and Station closed
