= Nantlle railway station =

Former railway station in Wales

Nantlle
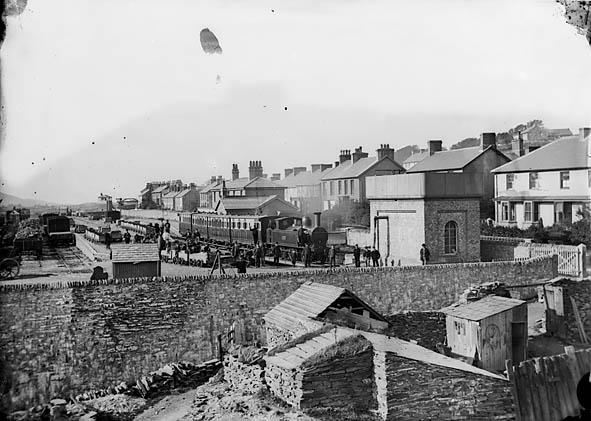
- Nantlle railway station c 1875

General information
- Location: Talysarn, Gwynedd; Wales
- Coordinates: 53.0522°N 4.2577°W
- Grid reference: SH 487 529
- Platforms: 1

Other information
- Status: Disused

History
- Original company: London and North Western Railway
- Post-grouping: London, Midland and Scottish Railway

Key dates
- 1 October 1872: Opened
- 1 January 1917: Closed as a wartime economy measure
- 5 May 1919 or July 1919: Reopened
- 8 August 1932: Closed to passengers
- 2 December 1963: Closed completely
Location

Nantlle was a railway station located in Talysarn, a neighbouring village to Nantlle, in Gwynedd, Wales.

From 1828 the narrow gauge, horse-drawn Nantlle Railway ran from wharves at Caernarfon through Penygroes and through the site of the future Nantlle station to slate quarries around the village of Nantlle. In the 1860s the Carnarvonshire Railway built a new standard gauge line southwards from Caernarfon to Afon Wen, replacing the Nantlle Railway's tracks as far south as Penygroes. The Nantlle quarries and railway were very much still in business, so they continued to send their products to Caernarfon by transhipping them onto the new railway at Tyddyn Bengam a short distance north of Penygroes.

This arrangement continued until 1872 when the LNWR repeated the earlier process and built a standard gauge branch partly on the Nantlle Railway trackbed from Penygroes to Talysarn, where it built a wholly new passenger station which it called Nantlle, though in reality the branch only reached halfway to the village of Nantlle. This station included a locomotive servicing area at its eastern end.

From then onwards products were transshipped from the quarry wagons onto standard gauge wagons in the goods yard at "Nantlle" station. The narrow gauge wagons were manoeuvred by horse and by hand, a way of working which, remarkably, survived until 1963.

Passenger traffic along the branch, which was less than a mile and a half long, was not heavy. The station closed to normal passenger traffic in 1932, though excursion traffic (mostly outbound from Nantlle) continued until 1939.

The station closed completely in 1963. The station building was still standing in 2012, though most other infrastructure had long been built over.

== Further material ==
- Clemens, Jim (2003) [1959-67]. North Wales Steam Lines No. 6 (DVD). Uffington, Shropshire: B&R Video Productions. BRVP No 79.
- Dunn, J.M. (September 1958). Cooke, B.W.C. (ed.). "The Afonwen Line-1". The Railway Magazine. 104 (689). London: Tothill Press Limited.
- Smith, Martin, ed. (May 2011). "The Nantlle Tramway". Railway Bylines. Vol. 16, no. 6. Clophill, Bedfordshire: Irwell Press. pp. 306–313. ISSN 1360-2098.

Preceding station	Historical railways	Following station
Terminus	London and North Western Railway	Penygroes; Line and Station closed
