= Chwilog railway station =

Former railway station in Wales

Chwilog
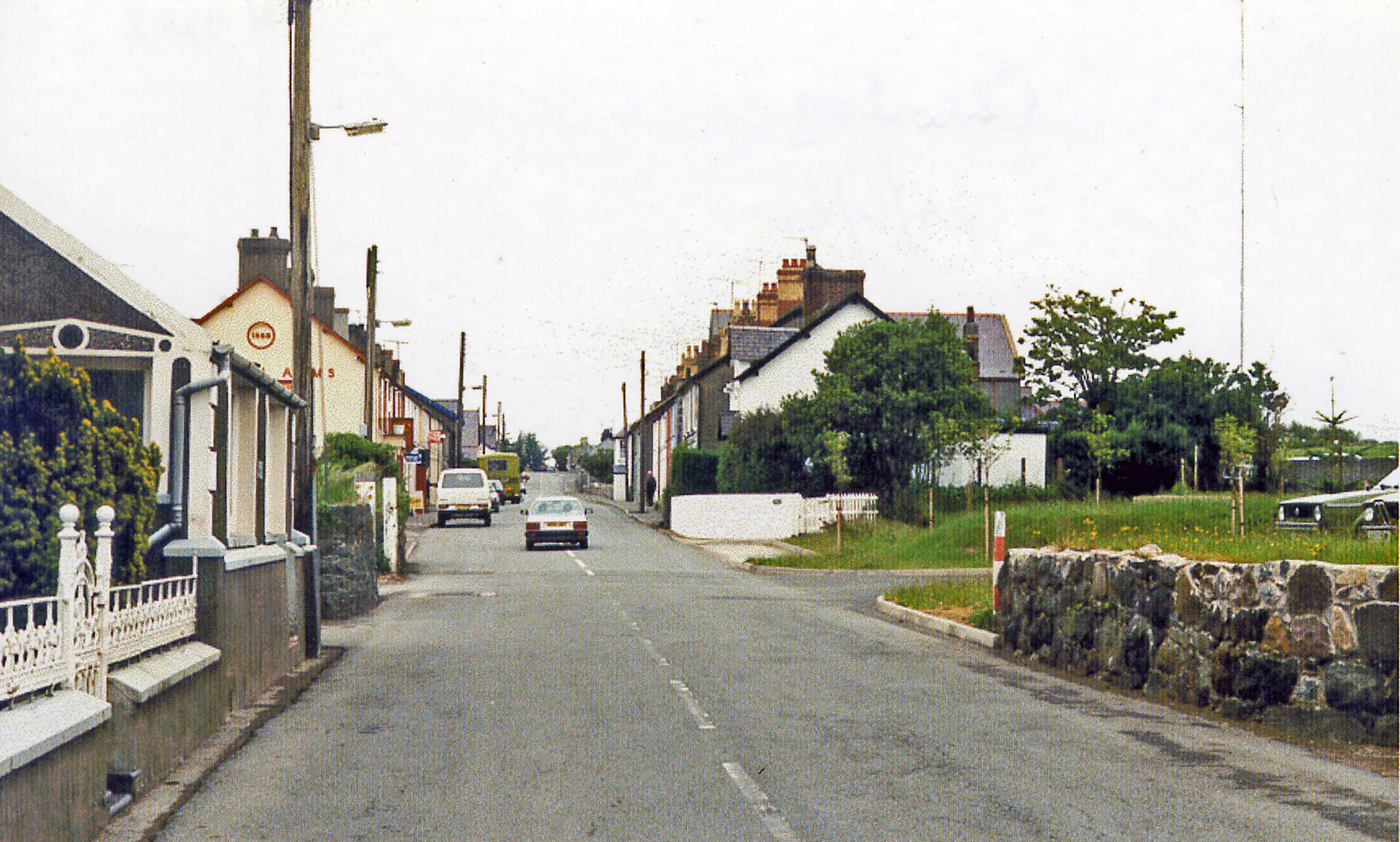
- Site of the former station in 1986

General information
- Location: Chwilog, Gwynedd; Wales
- Coordinates: 52.92027°N 4.33050°W
- Grid reference: SH 433 384
- Platforms: 1

Other information
- Status: Disused

History
- Original company: London and North Western Railway
- Post-grouping: London, Midland and Scottish Railway; Western Region of British Railways

Key dates
- 2 September 1867: Line and station opened
- 7 December 1964: Line and station closed
Location

Chwilog railway station was a railway station that served the village of Chwilog, Gwynedd, Wales. It was opened in 1867 by the Carnarvonshire Railway, who were subsequently taken over by the LNWR, passing to the LMSR at the Grouping of 1923. The station came under the London Midland Region of British Railways from nationalisation in 1948.

A year after the station opened £100 was spent improving its passenger accommodation.

Apart from goods and passenger services normal for a country station, a strong milk traffic was developed, culminating in a train of five vans of churns being sent to Liverpool daily from 1943 to 1949. The siding at Chwilog could only accommodate five vans, so the opportunity to expand the business was lost to road traffic in winter 1949–50.

The line and station closed in December 1964.

In 2015 the station area was covered by a bus station, but the platform was still in place behind a new housing estate and the station master's house was in use as a private residence.

Preceding station	Disused railways	Following station
Llangybi; Line and Station closed	London and North Western Railway; Carnarvonshire Railway	Afon Wen; Line closed; Station closed

== Sources ==
- Butt, R. V. J. (October 1995). The Directory of Railway Stations: details every public and private passenger station, halt, platform and stopping place, past and present (1st ed.). Sparkford: Patrick Stephens Ltd. ISBN 978-1-85260-508-7. OCLC 60251199. OL 11956311M.
- Dunn, J.M. (September 1958). Cooke, B.W.C. (ed.). "The Afonwen Line-1". The Railway Magazine. 104 (689). London: Tothill Press Limited. ISSN 0033-8923.
- Jowett, Alan (March 1989). Jowett's Railway Atlas of Great Britain and Ireland: From Pre-Grouping to the Present Day (1st ed.). Sparkford: Patrick Stephens Ltd. ISBN 978-1-85260-086-0. OCLC 22311137.
- Mitchell, Vic; Smith, Keith (2010). Bangor to Portmadoc: Including Three Llanberis Lines. Country Railway Routes. Midhurst: Middleton Press. ISBN 978-1-906008-72-7.
- Quick, Michael (2009) [2001]. Railway passenger stations in Great Britain: a chronology (4th ed.). Oxford: Railway & Canal Historical Society. ISBN 978-0-901461-57-5. OCLC 612226077.
- Rear, W.G. (2012). Caernarvon & the Lines from Afonwen & Llanberis: 28: Scenes from the Past Railways of North Wales. Nottingham: Book Law Publications. ISBN 978-1-907094-78-1.
- Turner, Alun (2003). Gwynedd's Lost Railways. Catrine, Ayrshire: Stenlake Publishing. ISBN 978-1-84033-259-9.

== Further material ==
- Clemens, Jim (2003) [1959-67]. North Wales Steam Lines No. 6 (DVD). Uffington, Shropshire: B&R Video Productions. BRVP No 79.
