= Carmel, Gwynedd =

Coordinates: 53.070°N 4.249°W

Carmel
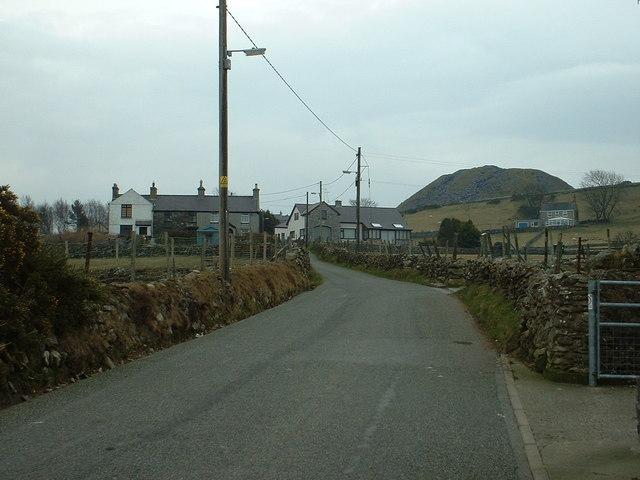
- Carmel village

- Location within Gwynedd
- OS grid reference: SH492550
- Community: Llandwrog
- Principal area: Gwynedd
- Country: Wales
- Sovereign state: United Kingdom
- Post town: CAERNARFON
- Postcode district: LL54
- Dialling code: 01286
- Police: North Wales
- Fire: North Wales
- Ambulance: Welsh
- UK Parliament: Dwyfor Meirionnydd
- Senedd Cymru – Welsh Parliament: Gwynedd Maldwyn

Carmel is a small village near Y Fron in Gwynedd, north-west Wales. The village is built up mainly of Victorian homes, with a more modern area. The village contains a number of chapels, which are gradually closing down and some being converted into homes. The Victorian village school and post office have also been closed. The last of the village's shops closed in 2014 (Siop Doris). There are a number of other businesses including a driving school, coal merchant and a garage. Nearby villages are Penygroes and Groeslon. Notable residents have included Dafydd Glyn Jones, Sir Thomas Parry (1904–1985), Principal of University College of Wales, Aberystwyth, from 1958 to 1969 and the artist Ifor Pritchard.
