= Eirug Wyn =

Welsh satirical novelist

- Born: Eirug Price Wynne; 11 December 1950; Llanbrynmair
- Died: 25 April 2004 (aged 53); Bangor, Wales
- Education: Trinity University College
- Occupation: novelist

Eirug Wyn (11 December 1950 – 25 April 2004) was a Welsh satirical novelist who wrote in the Welsh language. He was born Eirug Price Wynne, in Llanbrynmair in Mid Wales, and educated at Brynrefail School and Trinity College, Carmarthen. He subsequently made his home in Y Groeslon in North Wales.

At the age of 17 he appeared in court accused of not placing an L-plate on the back of his car, as was required in the United Kingdom for anyone learning to drive. Instead, he had placed a similar plate bearing the letter "D", for dysgwr, the Welsh equivalent. The eventual outcome of this case was to make D-plates a legally recognised equivalent to L-plates throughout Wales.

He wrote 15 books in the twelve years before his death, and won several prizes for his work at Eisteddfodau, including the prose medal in 1998 and 2000 and the Daniel Owen medal for novelists in 1994 and 2002. He also ran a bookshop, Siop y Pentan, in Caernarfon; wrote a column for the Western Mail; and edited Lol!, a satirical magazine.

He died of myeloma on 25 April 2004, at the age of 53.

== Works ==
- Y Drych Tywyll a Storïau Eraill (Y Lolfa, 1992)
- Smôc Gron Bach (Y Lolfa, 1994) – Gwobr Goffa Daniel Owen 1994
- Lara (Y Lolfa, 1995)
- United!, Cyfres y Dolffin (Cwmni Iaith, 1996)
- Elvis: Diwrnod i'r Brenin (Y Lolfa, 1996)
- I Ble'r Aeth Haul y Bore? (Y Lolfa, 1997)
- Blodyn Tatws (Y Lolfa, 1998) – Cyfrol y Fedal Ryddiaeth 1998
- Hogia'r Milgi (Y Lolfa, 1999)
- Tri Mochyn Bach (Y Lolfa, 2000) – Cyfrol y Fedal Ryddiaeth 2000
- I Dir Neb (Y Lolfa, 2001)
- Bitsh! (Y Lolfa, 2002) – Gwobr Goffa Daniel Owen 2002
- Powdwr Rhech! (Y Lolfa, 2002)
- Y Dyn yn y Cefn heb Fwstásh (Y Lolfa, 2004) ISBN 0-86243-735-0)
