= Ifor =

Ifor is a given name, a Welsh language variant of Ivor. Notable people with the name include:

- Ifor Bach (fl. 1158), 12th-century leader of South Wales
- Ifor Davies (1910–1982), Welsh politician
- Ifor Leslie Evans (1897–1952), Welsh academic
- Ifor James (1931–2004), British horn player and teacher
- Ifor Owen (1915–2007), Welsh educator
- Ifor Pritchard (1940–2010), Welsh artist
- Ifor Williams (1881–1965), Welsh scholar
- Ifor Wynne (1918–1970), Welsh-Canadian educator and university administrator
