= Llangybi railway station (Gwynedd) =

Railway station in Wales

Llangybi

General information
- Location: Llangybi, Gwynedd, Gwynedd; Wales
- Coordinates: 52.9342°N 4.3124°W
- Grid reference: SH 446 399
- Platforms: 2

Other information
- Status: Disused

History
- Original company: Carnarvonshire Railway
- Pre-grouping: London and North Western Railway
- Post-grouping: London, Midland and Scottish Railway; Western Region of British Railways

Key dates
- March 1869: Opened for fairs and markets only
- January 1872: Fully open
- 7 December 1964: Line and station closed
Location

Llangybi was a railway station located some distance from Llangybi, Gwynedd, Wales.

The station was isolated and lightly used, but it had two platforms and remained open until the line closed because it was a crossing place where the otherwise single track route became twin track for a short distance.

The line and station were closed in December 1964.

Preceding station	Historical railways	Following station
Ynys; Line and Station closed	Carnarvonshire Railway	Chwilog; Line and Station closed

== Sources ==
- Butt, R. V. J. (October 1995). The Directory of Railway Stations: details every public and private passenger station, halt, platform and stopping place, past and present (1st ed.). Sparkford: Patrick Stephens Ltd. ISBN 978-1-85260-508-7. OCLC 60251199. OL 11956311M.
- Johnson, Peter (1995). North Wales (Celebration of Steam). Shepperton: Ian Allan Publishing. ISBN 0-7110-2378-6.
- Jowett, Alan (March 1989). Jowett's Railway Atlas of Great Britain and Ireland: From Pre-Grouping to the Present Day (1st ed.). Sparkford: Patrick Stephens Ltd. ISBN 978-1-85260-086-0. OCLC 22311137.
- Mitchell, Vic; Smith, Keith (2010). Bangor to Portmadoc: Including Three Llanberis Lines. Country Railway Routes. Midhurst: Middleton Press. ISBN 978-1-906008-72-7.
- Quick, Michael (2009) [2001]. Railway passenger stations in Great Britain: a chronology (4th ed.). Oxford: Railway & Canal Historical Society. ISBN 978-0-901461-57-5. OCLC 612226077.
- Rear, W.G. (2012). Caernarvon & the Lines from Afonwen & Llanberis: 28: Scenes from the Past Railways of North Wales. Nottingham: Book Law Publications. ISBN 9-781907-094781.
- Turner, Alun (2003). Gwynedd's Lost Railways. Catrine, Ayrshire: Stenlake Publishing. ISBN 9781840332599.

== Further material ==
- Clemens, Jim (2003) [1959-67]. North Wales Steam Lines No. 6 (DVD). Uffington, Shropshire: B&R Video Productions. BRVP No 79.
- Dunn, J.M. (September 1958). Cooke, B.W.C. (ed.). "The Afonwen Line-1". The Railway Magazine. 104 (689). London: Tothill Press Limited.
