= Llion Iwan =

Welsh journalist, documentary producer, and author

Llion Iwan is a Welsh journalist, documentary producer, and author. He works through the medium of both Welsh and English. He is the son of politician and singer Dafydd Iwan.

He worked for the North Wales Weekly News before joining the BBC where he worked variously as a journalist, producer and director.

He lectured in journalism and documentary film at Bangor University.

From 2012–2016 he was factual content commissioner for S4C, and was Head of Content Distribution until 2018. In 2019 he joined Cwmni Da, an independent production company based in Caernarfon.

He lives in the village of Caeathro near Caernarfon.

== Television work ==
His television work, much of which relates to the outdoors and adventure, includes:

- Ellen MacArthur, Search For Speed, BBC1, (Producer /Director)
- Stradey Stories, ITV1, Director.
- Berzerk in Antarctica, BBC1, (Producer)
- Life On Land, BBC1, (Producer)

Alpau Eric Jones, S4C, Director.

- Everest, Getting to the Bottom of a Mountain, BBC2/4, (Assistant Producer)
- Sailing Through Heaven and Hell, BBC1, (Assistant Producer)
- The Great Dog Race, BBC1, (Assistant Producer)
- Fo, Fi a'r MC, S4C, Director.
- Straeon o'r Strade, S4C, Director.
- Drowning of a Village, BBC Wales, (Director)
- Gwlad Menyg Gwynion, S4C, (Producer/Director)
- In the Eye of the Storm, BBC1, (Assistant Producer)
- The Man Who Jumped Beneath the Earth, BBC1 Wales, (Producer/Director)
- Everest Diary, S4C, (Producer)
- Feet on the Ground, S4C, (Producer)
- Ice Challenger, BBC1, (Assistant Producer)
- Leo Houlding, BBC1, (Assistant Producer)
- Mr Sunset, Jeff Hakman story, BBC1, (Assistant Producer)
- Scott Gibbs, Out On His Own, BBC1 Wales, (Producer)
- Re-Union, Pumas, BBC2 Wales, (Producer)
- Re-Union, Wallabies, BBC2 Wales, (Producer)
- Re-Union, The Friendly Islands, BBC2 Wales, (Producer)

His awards include:

- Winner best director at the Grenoble Film Festival, 2004
- Winner at Dijon Mountain Film festival, 2005
- Winner, Best Regional Sport Documentary (Royal Television Society)

Special award Vancouver MFF 2004 Shortlisted at Banff MFF 2004.

- Shortlisted for Best Director (Bafta Wales 2002, 2004, 2005)

== Books ==
As an author he has had published:

- "O Afallon i Shangri La" (from Avalon to Shangri La) (2001)

The trilogy

- "Casglwr" (Collector) (2004)
- "Lladdwr" (Killer) (2005)
- "Euog" (Guilty) (2006)

Yr Anweledig (the invisible) (2008)

301, novel (2018) by Gomer.

Geraint Thomas, Y Cymro a’r Tour de France. (2018) Lolfa.

He has edited "Dafydd Iwan, A Life in Pictures" (2005) and contributed to "Y Mynydd Hwn" (This Mountain) (2005) and "Cewri Campau Cymru" (1999).
