= Brynkir railway station =

Closed railway station in Gwynedd, Wales

Brynkir
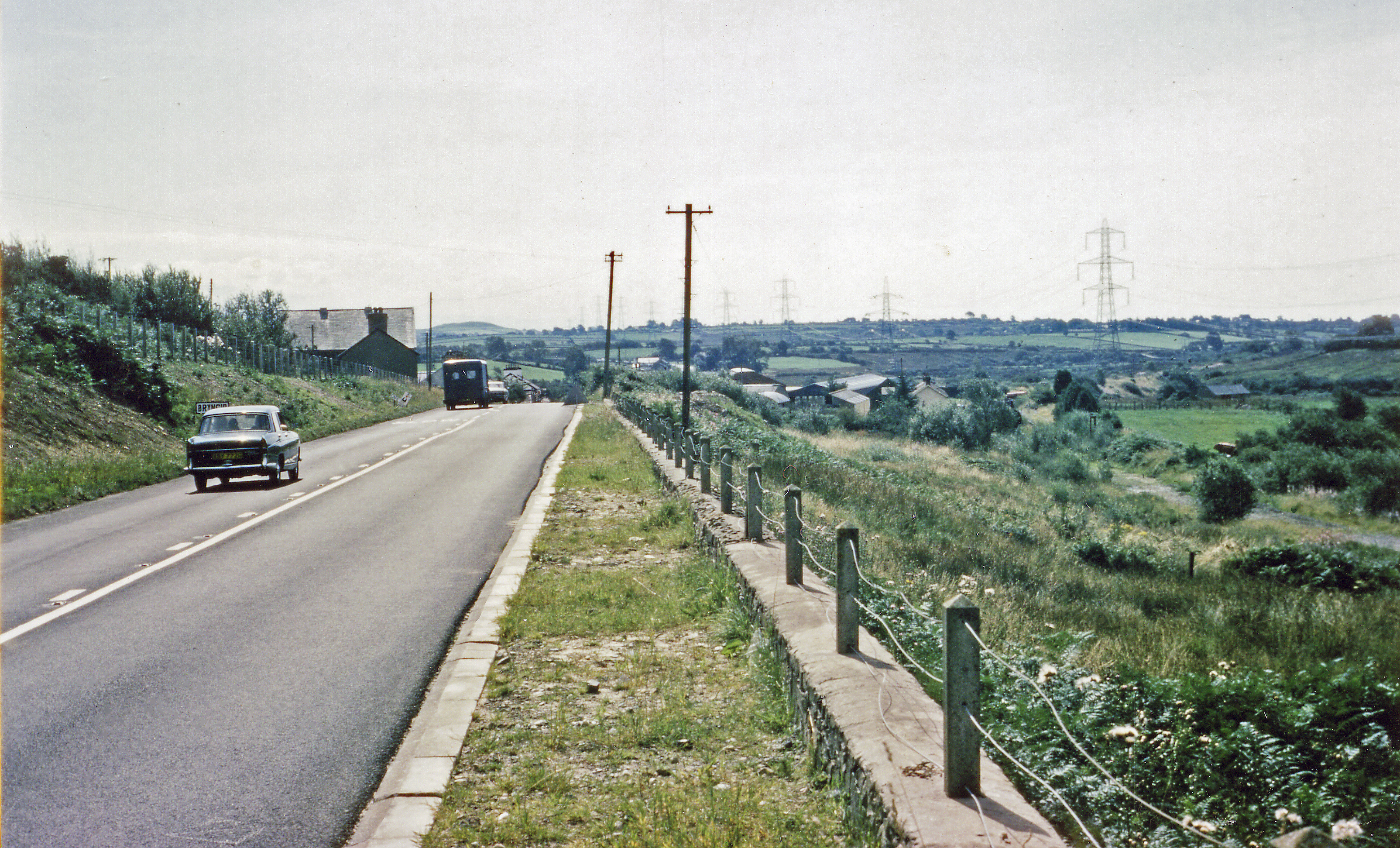
- The site of the station in 1975

General information
- Location: Dolbenmaen, Gwynedd; Wales
- Coordinates: 52.97727°N 4.26552°W
- Grid reference: SH 479 446
- Platforms: 2

Other information
- Status: Disused

History
- Original company: Carnarvonshire Railway
- Pre-grouping: London and North Western Railway
- Post-grouping: London, Midland and Scottish Railway

Key dates
- 2 September 1867: Opened
- 7 December 1964: Closed
Location

Brynkir railway station was opened by the Carnarvonshire Railway on the western edge of the village of Bryncir, Gwynedd, Wales.

The station was not heavily used, but it had two platforms and remained open until the line closed because it was a crossing place where the otherwise single track route became twin track for a short distance. It also had facilities for locomotives to replenish their water tanks.

A derailment accident killed six passengers at the station on 6 September 1866, before formal opening.

The station was host to an LMS caravan from 1935 to 1939. A camping coach was also positioned here by the London Midland Region from 1954 to 1955.

The line and station closed on 7 December 1964 as recommended in the Beeching Report.

== Further material ==
- Clemens, Jim (2003) [1959-67]. North Wales Steam Lines No. 6 (DVD). Uffington, Shropshire: B&R Video Productions. BRVP No 79.
- Dunn, J.M. (September 1958). Cooke, B.W.C. (ed.). "The Afonwen Line-1". The Railway Magazine. 104 (689). London: Tothill Press Limited.

Preceding station	Historical railways	Following station
Pant Glas; Line and Station closed	Carnarvonshire Railway	Ynys; Line and Station closed
