= Ifor Pritchard =

Ifor Pritchard (1940 - 9 October 2010) was an artist and former art teacher predominantly at Ysgol Syr Hugh Owen, Caernarfon in North Wales, retiring in 1992.

His paintings mostly drew on his childhood in the North Wales village of Carmel, Gwynedd and his memories of the local slate quarries.

Working with oil and using an impasto technique, he built up the surface of his canvases with thick blocks of solid colour, creating bold and dynamic portraits of remembered and imagined figures of the slate industry. He predominantly utilised a limited palette with a preference for blues, greys and purples, although exceptions include the quarrymen's brass band, their outfits rendered in bright reds and vibrant oranges.

Pritchard first exhibited his slate-inspired work at an exhibition at Glynllifon, near Caernarfon in 2007 exhibiting 30 original works. At his peak he exhibited 60 pieces in June 2009 at the Oriel Ynys Mon, Anglesey.

Pritchard died aged 70 in Porthmadog following a short illness.

A book titled 'Craig yr Oesoedd / True Grit' was posthumously published in October 2011 by Carreg Gwalch cataloging in 80 pages some of his best work.
