= Carnarvon (Pant) railway station =

Disused railway station in Wales

Carnarvon (Pant)

General information
- Location: Caernarfon, Gwynedd; Wales
- Coordinates: 53.1265°N 4.2731°W
- Grid reference: SH 480 612
- Platforms: 1

Other information
- Status: Disused

History
- Original company: Carnarvonshire Railway
- Pre-grouping: London and North Western Railway

Key dates
- 2 September 1867: Opened
- 1 August 1870 or 3 January 1871 or 5 July 1870: Closed, replaced by Carnarvon
Location

Carnarvon (Pant) was the temporary northern terminus of the Carnarvonshire Railway, located on the southern fringe of Caernarfon, Gwynedd, Wales.

The line from Afon Wen to Caernarfon was built from the country end, as were the other standard gauge routes to the town, resulting in there being three temporary termini on the edges of Caernarfon. This was eventually resolved by building the "Caernarfon Town Line" through a tunnel under the historic centre to join the various routes. When this was completed Pant station was closed.

The station appears to have been built on rented land, as in November 1868 a Mr Rice Thomas threatened to eject the railway from the station for non-payment of rent. The facilities included a platform and a turntable, both still traceable on the land in the 1940s and a siding which acted as an open air engine shed.

Freight and passenger trains passed through the edge of the station site until 7 December 1964, when all services were withdrawn. The line was lifted in 1969.

In 1997 the Welsh Highland Railway began running through the edge of the station site, having used part of the trackbed for their narrow gauge line to Porthmadog.

Sources cited in this article differ on the station's location, research continues.

Preceding station	Historical railways	Following station
Terminus	Carnarvonshire Railway	Dinas Junction; Line and Station closed
