= Groeslon =

Village in Gwynedd, Wales

Coordinates: 53.078°N 4.280°W

Groeslon: Welsh: Y Groeslon
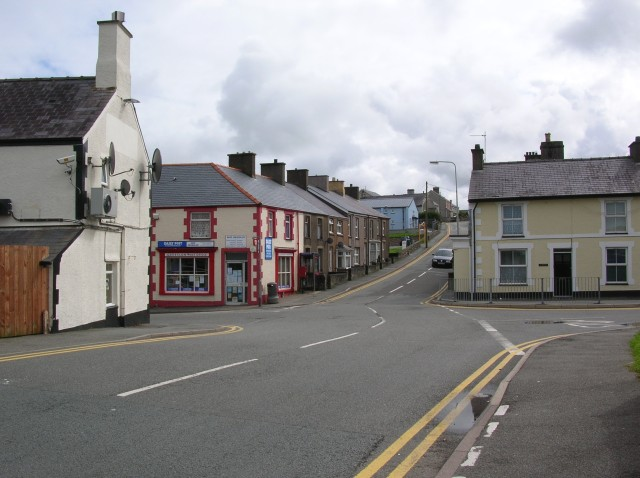
- Groeslon Post Office

- Location within Gwynedd
- Population: 880 (2011)
- OS grid reference: SH472558
- Community: Llandwrog
- Principal area: Gwynedd
- Country: Wales
- Sovereign state: United Kingdom
- Post town: CAERNARFON
- Postcode district: LL54
- Dialling code: 01286
- Police: North Wales
- Fire: North Wales
- Ambulance: Welsh
- UK Parliament: Dwyfor Meirionnydd
- Senedd Cymru – Welsh Parliament: Arfon

Groeslon (Welsh pronunciation; sometimes Welsh: Y Groeslon, 'the crossroads') is a small village in the community of Llandwrog in Gwynedd, Wales. The population was 880 at the 2011 census.

Nearby villages are Pen-y-groes, Carmel and Dinas. The village lies approximately five miles (8 km) south of Caernarfon.

Groeslon was by-passed in 2002 by the A487 road, a trunk road which cost around £12 million to complete. A bat bridge was constructed in 2010 to guide lesser horseshoe bats across the road.

Formerly an agricultural and slate mining village, Groeslon is now expanding as a commuter village for the surrounding towns, especially Caernarfon and Bangor. Its initial growth came as a result of the construction of the LMS railway in 1867. Groeslon railway station closed in December 1964. The railway line is now part of the national cycle route.

In the village there is one pub, the Tafarn Pennionyn.

At the bottom of the village, bordering the A487, a huge wall is visible. This is the wall to the Glynllifon estate, formerly the seat of Lord Newborough, which is now a country park and a campus of Coleg Meirion-Dwyfor specialising in land-based courses including agriculture, animal studies and veterinary nursing.

Groeslon is covered by a neighbourhood policing team based in Pen-y-groes.

== Governance ==
Y Groeslon electoral ward is currently represented in Cyngor Gwynedd by Plaid Cymru councillor Llio Elenid Owen. This ward extends beyond the confines of Groeslon village, and the total population taken at the 2011 Census was 1,695. Historically, Groeslon was part of Caernarfonshire until the creation of Gwynedd in 1974.

The village forms part Llandwrog Community Council, currently chaired by councillor Gwyn Owen Jones.

== Education ==
Ysgol Bro Llifon provides Welsh-medium primary education to Groeslon, Carmel and Y Fron. As of 2026, there were 150 pupils enrolled at the school; 79.1 per cent of pupils spoke Welsh at home.

In terms of secondary education, the village is in the catchment area of Ysgol Dyffryn Nantlle in Pen-y-groes.

== Notable residents ==
- Welsh author Eirug Wyn until his death in 2004.
- The dramatist John Gwilym Jones (1904–1988)
- Poet Tom Huws.
- Llion Iwan, Welsh documentary journalist/producer and author.
- 'The Laughing Postman' Arwel Jones.
- Novelist Menna Medi

== Bibliography ==
Hanes Y Groeslon (History of Groeslon) available from public libraries:
