= R. Williams Parry =

Poet in Welsh

Robert Williams Parry
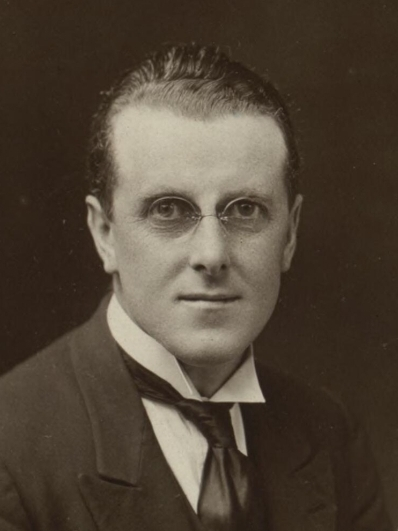
- Born: 6 March 1884; Tal-y-sarn, Gwynedd, Wales
- Died: 4 January 1956 (aged 71); Bethesda, Gwynedd, Wales

Robert Williams Parry (6 March 1884 – 4 January 1956) was one of Wales's most notable 20th-century poets writing in Welsh.

== Life ==
R. Williams Parry was born in Tal-y-sarn, in Dyffryn Nantlle, a first cousin to the writers T. H. Parry-Williams and Sir Thomas Parry. He studied at Tal-y-sarn elementary school, then at Caernarfon county school from 1896 to 1898, and for one year at the new Pen-y-groes county school, then becoming a pupil-teacher from 1899 to 1902. He went to the University College of Wales, Aberystwyth, from 1902 to 1904, and left having taken part of the degree course and trained as a teacher. After working as a teacher at various schools until 1907, he completed his degree at the University College of North Wales, Bangor, then from 1908 to 1910 taught Welsh and English at Llanberis county school. He returned to college at Bangor and spent some months in Brittany working towards an MA degree, which he was awarded in 1912 for a dissertation on points of contact between Welsh and Breton, subsequently resuming his teaching work at Cefnddwysarn, then at Barry county school, and was appointed English master at Cardiff High School for Boys in 1916. Parry served in the army from 1916 to 1918, returning on demobilization to Cardiff, and in 1921 was appointed headmaster of Oakley Park School in Montgomeryshire. He left early in 1922 having been appointed a lecturer in the Welsh and Extra-Mural Studies Departments at the university college in Bangor, where he remained until his retirement in 1944. After his marriage in 1923 he lived in Bethesda, Gwynedd.

== Work ==
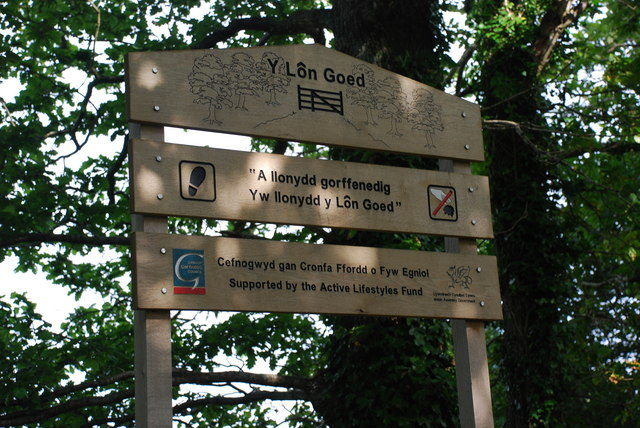
A llonydd gorffenedig/ Yw llonydd y Lôn Goed The peace of Lôn Goed Is perfect peace (Verse from the poem "Eifionydd" on a sign in Gwynedd.

Parry earned widespread recognition as a poet when he won the chair at the 1910 National Eisteddfod for his poem "Yr Haf" ('The Summer'), which has been described as "the best known and admired of all the eisteddfod awdlau of the 20th century". He published two collections of poetry: Yr Haf a cherddi eraill (1924) and Cerddi'r Gaeaf (1952).

Some of his most notable works include "Y Llwynog" ('The Fox'), "Eifionydd" and "Englynion coffa Hedd Wyn". In the latter he uses the traditional four-line verse or englyn and cynghanedd to lament the death of the poet Hedd Wyn (Ellis Humphrey Evans) at the Battle of Passchendaele in 1917. Hedd Wyn was posthumously awarded the chair at the National Eisteddfod of Wales; Parry, three years Hedd Wyn's senior, was himself a major influence on his contemporary.

"The chair ... today stretching out its arms in a long peace of silence for the one who hasn't come."

There is a short biography and appreciation of Parry's work by his cousin, Sir Thomas Parry, in the Dictionary of Welsh Biography.

== Bibliography ==
=== Books by R. Williams Parry ===
- Yr Haf a cherddi eraill (1924)
- Cerddi'r Gaeaf (1952)
