= Afon Wen railway station =

Railway station in Afon Wen, Gwynedd, Wales

Afon Wen
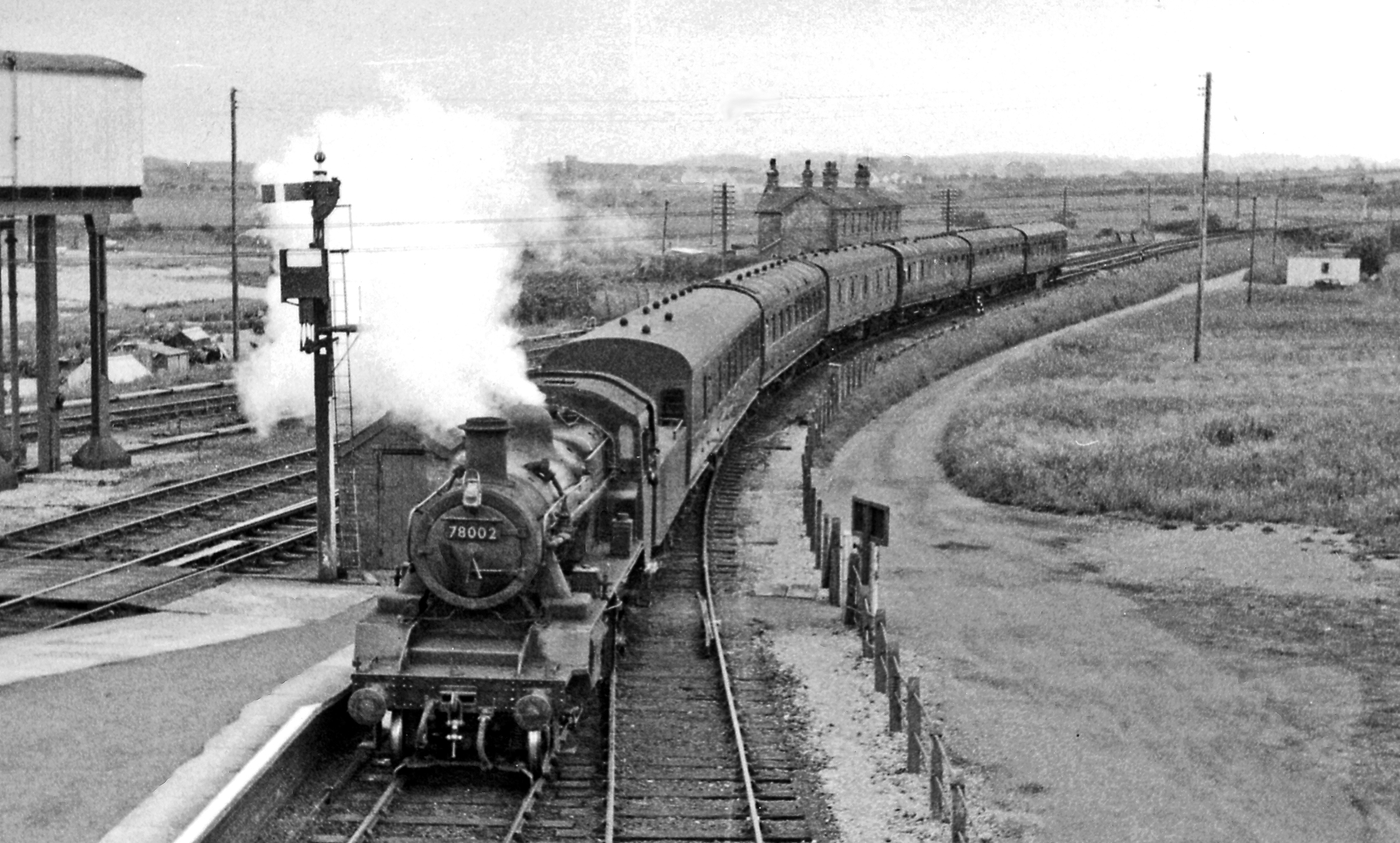
- Pwllheli - Bangor train in 1962

General information
- Location: Afon Wen, Gwynedd; Wales
- Coordinates: 52.90909°N 4.31348°W
- Grid reference: SH 444 371
- Platforms: 3

Other information
- Status: Disused

History
- Original company: Aberystwith and Welsh Coast Railway
- Pre-grouping: Cambrian Railways
- Post-grouping: Great Western Railway

Key dates
- 2 September 1867: Opened
- 7 December 1964: Closed
Location

Afon Wen was a railway station in Afon Wen, Gwynedd, Wales, four miles (6 km) west of Criccieth.

The station formed a junction between the Aberystwith and Welsh Coast Railway and the Carnarvonshire Railway and opened to traffic in September 1867.

== History ==
Trains on the Aberystwith and Welsh Coast Railway line were operated by the Cambrian Railways, then absorbed into the Great Western Railway. Trains from the Carnarvonshire Railway were operated by the London and North Western Railway and so passed to the London, Midland and Scottish Railway.

The station was host to a GWR camp coach from 1934 to 1939.

The station passed on to the Western Region of British Railways on nationalisation in 1948 (later passing to the London Midland Region in 1963). It was then closed by the British Railways Board on 7 December 1964 (concurrently with the line from Caernavon, both as a result of the Beeching Axe).

In addition to local services Afon Wen was served by trains from both London Paddington and London Euston. Those from Paddington would reach it on Cambrian rails through Machynlleth and Porthmadog, proceeding onward to terminate at Pwllheli. From Euston the train would travel via Crewe, Bangor and Caernarfon: at Afon Wen the front portion of the train would proceed forward to terminate at Porthmadog and the rear carriages would be detached for Pwllheli.

Afon Wen is often quoted as a defining feature of the Great Western Railway in Wales, namely its inheritance of junctions in unlikely and inconvenient locations. Other examples are Moat Lane Junction, Talyllyn Junction, Dovey Junction and Barmouth Junction (renamed Morfa Mawddach in 1960).

The signal box and passing loop initially remained in use after the station closed, but after the lifting of the Caernarfon line, these were decommissioned in 1967 and removed three years later (leaving only the old westbound platform line in use as the running line to Pwllheli). Demolition of the surviving buildings and westbound platform followed by the late 1970s.

== The site today ==
Trains on the Cambrian Line pass the site of the former station.

The only evidence of the junction that can now be seen from Cambrian Coast trains is the earthworks of the line heading north and the island platform, although the branch side has been filled in.

| Preceding station | Historical railways | Following station |
|---|---|---|
| Abererch; Line and station open | Cambrian Railways; Aberystwith and Welsh Coast Railway | Criccieth; Line and station open |
| Chwilog; Line and station closed | London and North Western Railway; Carnarvonshire Railway | Terminus |

== In popular culture ==
- Afon Wen station is known to many through the song Ar y Trên i Afon Wen (On the train to Afon Wen) by the popular Welsh pop group, Sobin a'r Smaeliaid, fronted by Bryn Fôn.

== Sources ==
- Butt, R. V. J. (October 1995). The Directory of Railway Stations: details every public and private passenger station, halt, platform and stopping place, past and present (1st ed.). Sparkford: Patrick Stephens Ltd. ISBN 978-1-85260-508-7. OCLC 60251199. OL 11956311M.
- Jones, Gwyn Briwnant; Jenkins, David (1995). Great Western Railways in Wales. The work of the official photographer. Cardiff: Harry Ransom Humanities Research Center. ISBN 0-7200-0425-X.
- Jowett, Alan (March 1989). Jowett's Railway Atlas of Great Britain and Ireland: From Pre-Grouping to the Present Day (1st ed.). Sparkford: Patrick Stephens Ltd. ISBN 978-1-85260-086-0. OCLC 22311137.
- Jowett, Alan (2000). Jowett's Nationalised Railway Atlas (1st ed.). Penryn, Cornwall: Atlantic Transport Publishers. ISBN 978-0-906899-99-1. OCLC 228266687.
- McRae, Andrew (1997). British Railway Camping Coach Holidays: The 1930s & British Railways (London Midland Region). Vol. Scenes from the Past: 30 (Part One). Foxline. ISBN 1-870119-48-7.
- Mitchell, Vic; Smith, Keith (2010). Bangor to Portmadoc: Including Three Llanberis Lines. Country Railway Routes. Midhurst: Middleton Press. ISBN 978-1-906008-72-7.
- Mitchell, Vic; Smith, Keith (2009). Barmouth to Pwllheli. Western Main Lines. Midhurst: Middleton Press. ISBN 978-1-906008-53-6.
- Turner, Alun (2003). Gwynedd's Lost Railways. Catrine, Ayrshire: Stenlake Publishing. ISBN 9781840332599.

== Further material ==
- Clemens, Jim (2003) [1959-67]. North Wales Steam Lines No. 6 (DVD). Uffington, Shropshire: B&R Video Productions. BRVP No 79.
