= Carnarvonshire Railway =

British railway company (1867–1870)

Overview
- Locale: Wales

History
- Opened: 29 July 1862
- Closed: December 1964

Technical
- Line length: 27 miles (43 km)
- Track gauge: 4 ft 8 1/2 in (1,435 mm)

The Carnarvonshire Railway was a railway connecting Caernarvon (terminus of the Bangor and Caernarvon Railway line from Bangor) with Afon Wen.

== History ==
Carnarvonshire Railway Act 1862
- Act of Parliament
- Parliament of the United Kingdom
- Long title: An Act for making a Railway from Carnarvon to Port Madoc in the County of Carnarvon.
- Citation: 25 & 26 Vict. c. ccii

Dates
- Royal assent: 29 July 1862

Carnarvonshire Railway (Nantlle Railway Transfer) Act 1867
- Act of Parliament
- Parliament of the United Kingdom
- Long title: An Act for vesting the Undertaking of the Nantlle Railway Company in the Carnarvonshire Railway Company, and for other Purposes.
- Citation: 30 & 31 Vict. c. clii

Dates
- Royal assent: 25 July 1867

Text of statute as originally enacted

Carnarvonshire Railway (Deviations) Act 1867
- Act of Parliament
- Parliament of the United Kingdom
- Long title: An Act to enable the Carnarvonshire Railway Company to make Deviations in their authorized Railway; and for other Purposes.
- Citation: 30 & 31 Vict. c. clxii

Dates
- Royal assent: 25 July 1867

Text of statute as originally enacted

The Carnarvonshire Railway was authorised by the Carnarvonshire Railway Act 1862 (25 & 26 Vict. c. ccii). It was absorbed into the LNWR in 1869. At the grouping of the railways in 1921 the LNWR became part of the LMS.

At Afon Wen, a junction connected with the Cambrian Line (GWR) to Pwllheli in one direction and to Porthmadog in the other, with the LNWR (and later LMS) having running rights to both. The line had two branches, one from Caernarfon to Llanberis, which was built by the Carnarvon and Llanberis Railway and the other from Penygroes to Nantlle. The latter originally formed part of the narrow gauge Nantlle Railway, which between Penygroes and Caernarvon had been incorporated into the Carnarvonshire Railway by the Carnarvonshire Railway (Nantlle Railway Transfer) Act 1867 (30 & 31 Vict. c. clii) and converted to standard gauge.

== Closure ==
Regular passenger service on the Llanberis branch ceased in the 1930 (but summer passenger excursions from Llandudno etc. ran from 1932 until 1939 and again from 1946 until 1962). Likewise the Nantlle branch passenger service also ceased in 1932. The remaining lines and services (Afon Wen to Caernarvon) were shut completely as part of the Beeching Axe in December 1964.

== Trackbed re-use ==
A section of the line, from Caernarfon to Dinas, was incorporated into the reopened narrow gauge Welsh Highland Railway as the first phase of the line, in 1997. Several miles of the trackbed southwards from Dinas have been used to improve the A487 road. Some original sections remain and have been used as part of National Cycle Route 8.

The cycle route (Lôn Eifion) and the narrow gauge railway share the old trackbed south of Caernarfon to Dinas.

The tunnel under the centre of Caernarfon has been reopened, for road traffic.

== See also ==
- Traws Link Cymru
