= Crampton locomotive =

Type of steam locomotive, built from 1846

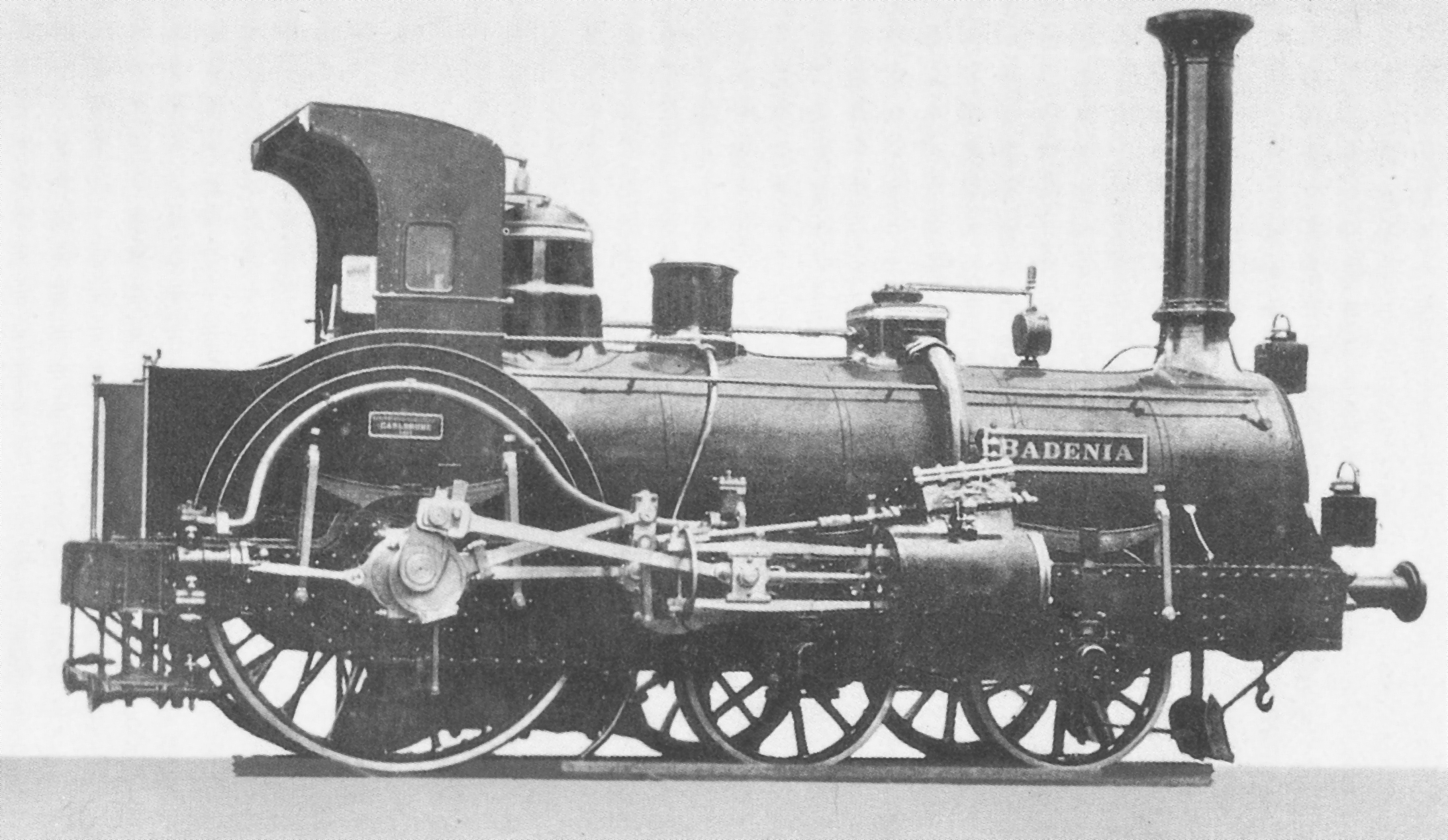
German Crampton locomotive Badenia of the Baden State Railway, built in 1863

A Crampton locomotive is a type of mostly single-drive steam locomotive designed by Thomas Russell Crampton and built by various firms from 1846. The main British builders were Tulk and Ley and Robert Stephenson and Company.

Notable features were a low boiler and two large driving wheels. The crux of the Crampton patent was that the single driving axle was placed behind the firebox, so that the driving wheels could be very large. This helped to give this design a low centre of gravity, so that it did not require a very broad-gauge track to travel safely at high speeds. Its wheel arrangement was usually 4-2-0 or 6-2-0.

== Design variations ==
Because the single driving axle was behind the firebox, Crampton locomotives usually had outside cylinders. However, some inside cylinder versions were built using indirect drive, then known as a jackshaft. The inside cylinders drove a crankshaft located in front of the firebox and the crankshaft was connected to the driving wheels by outside rods. Some long-wheelbase 0-4-0Ts were also built using this crankshaft system. The boiler feed-pump was often driven from the crankshaft as well because many Cramptons were built before the injector was invented.

Another feature on some Crampton locomotives was the use of a boiler of oval cross-section, to lower the centre of gravity. It was later seen as a major flaw, because the internal pressure would tend to push the boiler into a circular cross-section and increase the risk of fatigue.

== Usage ==
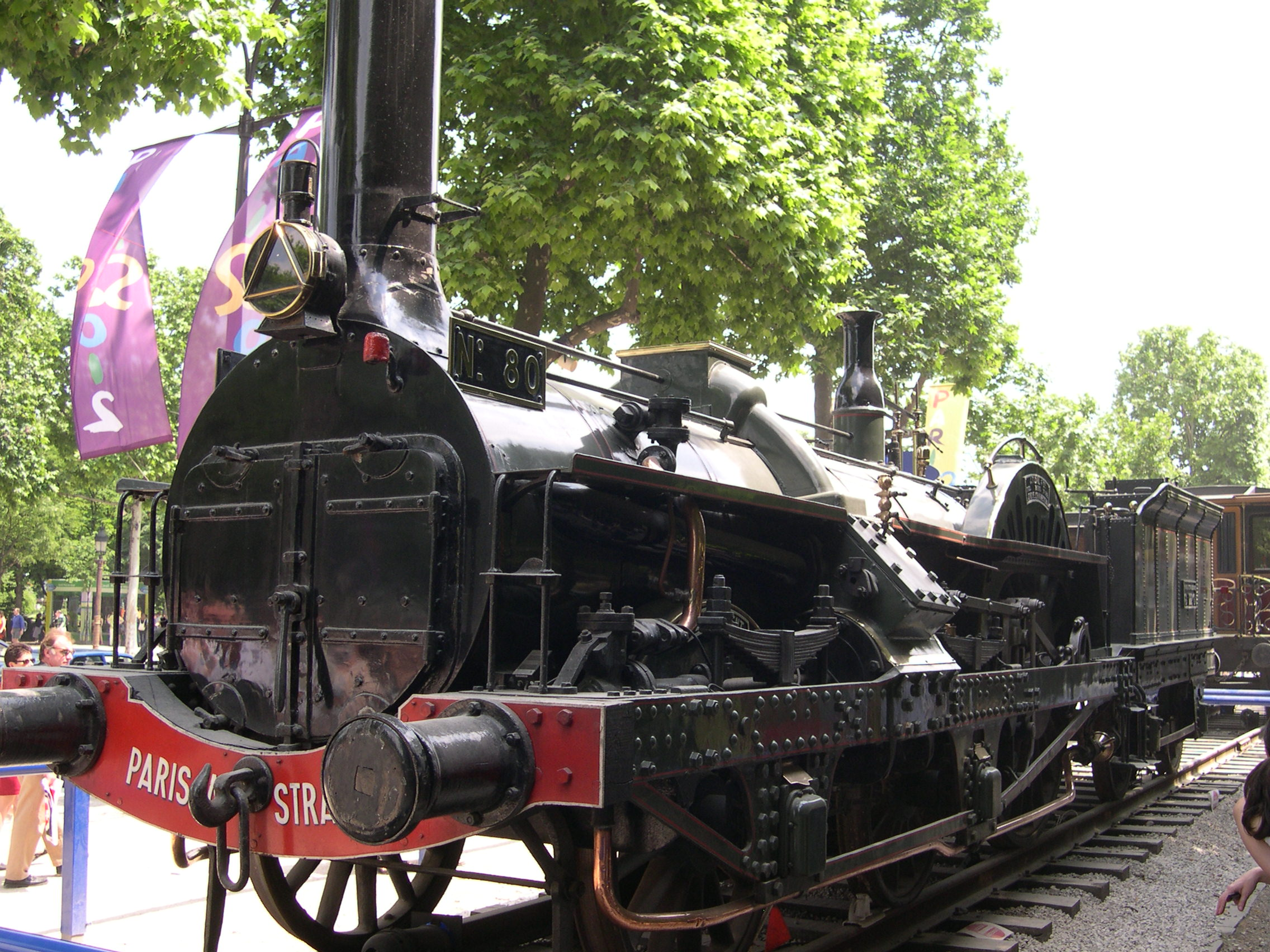
Preserved French Crampton locomotive No 80 Le Continent of the Paris à Strasbourg railway, built in 1852

Crampton locomotives were used by some British railways and speeds of up to 120 km/h (75 mph) were achieved on the LNWR. They were more popular in France, southern Germany and the US. In France the expression "prendre la Crampton" meant to catch an express, and in the argot of the Saint Cyr military academy, footplate staff were known as "officiers de Crampton" (and this as late as 1971). One of the French examples has been preserved in the Cité du Train (the French Railway Museum) at Mulhouse and is still in working order. This is number 80 of the Chemin de Fer de l'Est, the Paris-Strasbourg line, which is named "Le Continent".

== Locomotive list ==
The approximate numbers of Crampton-type locomotives built in Europe were:

- Great Britain: 51
- France: 127
- Germany: 135

=== Manufactured in Great Britain ===
==== Built by Tulk and Ley ====
All were of the 4-2-0 wheel arrangement.

Works no.	Date built	Railway	Name/no.	Notes
10	1847	Namur and Liege Railway	Namur	(Note: Namur was tested over 2,300 miles (3,700 km) on the LNWR speeds up to 62 miles per hour (100 km/h) were recorded. Delivery of Namur, Liege and the third engine ordered for Belgium was delayed, and they were purchased by the South Eastern Railway in December 1849, becoming SER Nos 81, 83 and 85.)
11	1847	Namur and Liege Railway	Liege	
	1847	Namur and Liege Railway		
12?	1847	London and North Western Railway, Southern Division	200 London	(Note: Larger boiler and cylinders than Namur. Rebuilt as a goods 0-4-2 in 1855.) (Note: The LNWR obtained two other Crampton-type locomotives: Courier, 4-2-0, built at Crewe Works in 1847 and Liverpool, 6-2-0, built by Bury, Curtis, and Kennedy in 1848.)
14	1847	Dundee and Perth and Aberdeen Junction Railway	Kinnaird	(Note: the Dundee and Perth and Aberdeen Junction Railway was absorbed by the Scottish Central Railway in 1863.)
	1847	Sheffield, Ashton-under-Lyne and Manchester Railway	35 Pegasus	
	1848	Sheffield, Ashton-under-Lyne and Manchester Railway	36 Phlegon	
17	1854	Maryport and Carlisle Railway	12	

==== Built by Robert Stephenson and Company ====
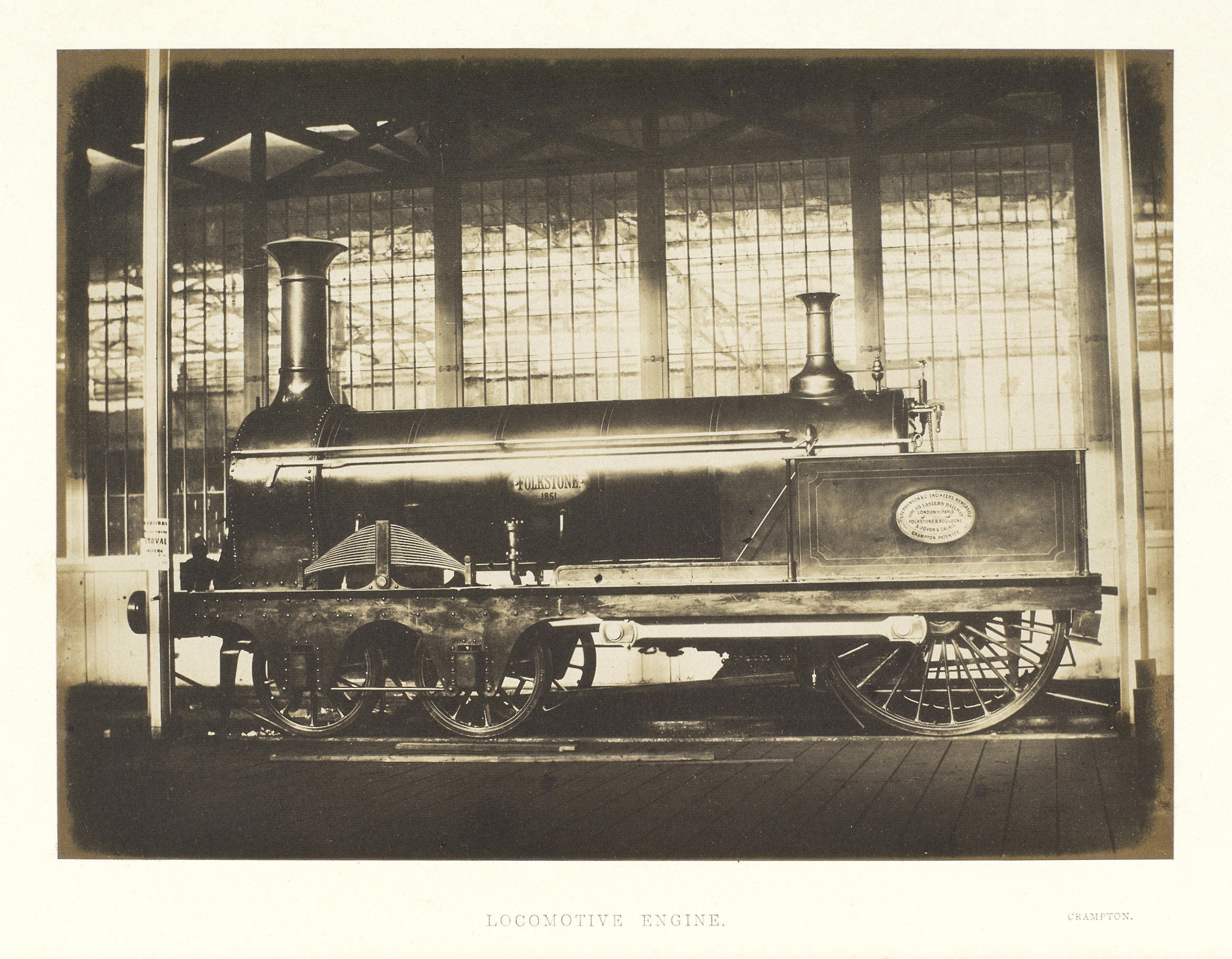
SER No. 136 Folkstone with intermediate crankshaft at the Great Exhibition in 1851.

Robert Stephenson and Company built a number of Crampton type locomotives for the South Eastern Railway and the London, Chatham and Dover Railway. These were all of 4-2-0 wheel arrangement with inside cylinders and indirect drive. The inside cylinders drove a crankshaft located in front of the firebox and the crankshaft was coupled to the driving wheels by outside rods.

Works no.	Date built	Railway	No./Name	Notes
785	1851	South Eastern Railway	134	
786	1851	South Eastern Railway	135	
787	1851	South Eastern Railway	136 Folkstone	(Note: The name should have read Folkestone but was misspelled on the plate. This locomotive was displayed at The Great Exhibition of 1851. Bogie wheels 3 feet 6 inches (1.07 m) diameter, driving wheels 6 feet (1.83 m) diameter. Cylinders 15 by 22 inches (381 mm × 559 mm). Weight 26 long tons 5 cwt (58,800 lb or 26.7 t).)
788	1851	South Eastern Railway	137	
789	1851	South Eastern Railway	138	
790	1851	South Eastern Railway	139	
791	1851	South Eastern Railway	140	
792	1851	South Eastern Railway	141	
793	1851	South Eastern Railway	142	
794	1851	South Eastern Railway	143	
	1851	Prussian Eastern Railway	England	
	1851	Prussian Eastern Railway		
	1851	Prussian Eastern Railway		
	1851	Prussian Eastern Railway		
	1851	Prussian Eastern Railway		
	1851	Prussian Eastern Railway		
1381	1862	London, Chatham and Dover Railway	Coquette	(Note: LCDR Echo class; rebuilt as conventional 4-4-0s in 1865–1866. They were not given numbers until 1874.)
1382	1862	London, Chatham and Dover Railway	Echo	(Note: LCDR Echo class; rebuilt as conventional 4-4-0s in 1865–1866. They were not given numbers until 1874.)
1383	1862	London, Chatham and Dover Railway	Flora	(Note: LCDR Echo class; rebuilt as conventional 4-4-0s in 1865–1866. They were not given numbers until 1874.)
1384	1862	London, Chatham and Dover Railway	Flirt	(Note: LCDR Echo class; rebuilt as conventional 4-4-0s in 1865–1866. They were not given numbers until 1874.)
1385	1862	London, Chatham and Dover Railway	Sylph	(Note: LCDR Echo class; rebuilt as conventional 4-4-0s in 1865–1866. They were not given numbers until 1874.)

==== Built by Bury, Curtis, and Kennedy ====
All 4-2-0 except Liverpool which was 6-2-0.

Works no.	Date built	Railway	No./Name	Notes
355	1848	London and North Western Railway, Southern Division	245 Liverpool	(Note: Liverpool, 6-2-0, built by Bury, Curtis, and Kennedy works number 355 of 1848. Driving wheels 8 feet (2.44 m) diameter, grate area 21.5 square feet (2.00 m^{2}), heating area 2,290 square feet (213 m^{2}), boiler pressure 120 lbf/in^{2} (8.4 kgf/cm^{2}; 830 kPa), cylinders 18 by 24 inches (457 mm × 610 mm). The locomotive was awarded a Gold Medal at the Great Exhibition of 1851.)
?	1848	South Eastern Railway	68	
?	1848	South Eastern Railway	69	
?	1848	South Eastern Railway	72	
?	1848	South Eastern Railway	74	
?	1848	South Eastern Railway	75	
?	1848	South Eastern Railway	78	

==== Built by E. B. Wilson and Company ====
Works no.	Date built	Railway	Name/no.	Notes
?	1847	North British Railway	55	(Note: Hauled the Royal Train in 1850, withdrawn from service in 1907.)
?	1847	Eastern Counties Railway	108	
?	1847	Eastern Counties Railway	109	
?	1847	Eastern Counties Railway	110	
?	1847	Eastern Counties Railway	111	
?	1847	Eastern Counties Railway	112	
?	1847	Aberdeen Railway	26	
?	1847	Aberdeen Railway	27	

==== Built by R and W Hawthorn ====
Works no.	Date built	Railway	Name/no.	Notes
890	1854	Sjællandske Jernbane Selskab	Roeskilde	(Note: Originally built by Tulk and Ley in 1849, rebuilt with new works number by Hawthorn)
891	1854	Sjællandske Jernbane Selskab	Ringsted	
892	1854	Sjællandske Jernbane Selskab	Sorø	
893	1854	Sjællandske Jernbane Selskab	Slagelse	
1006	1858	East Kent Railway	Lake	(Note: LCDR Sondes class 4-4-0ST. Rebuilt by Martley as LCDR F class 2-4-0T in 1865.)
1007	1858	East Kent Railway	Sondes	
1008	1858	East Kent Railway	Faversham	
1009	1858	East Kent Railway	Chatham	
1010	1858	East Kent Railway	Sittingbourne	
1011	1858	East Kent Railway	Crampton	

==== Other builders ====
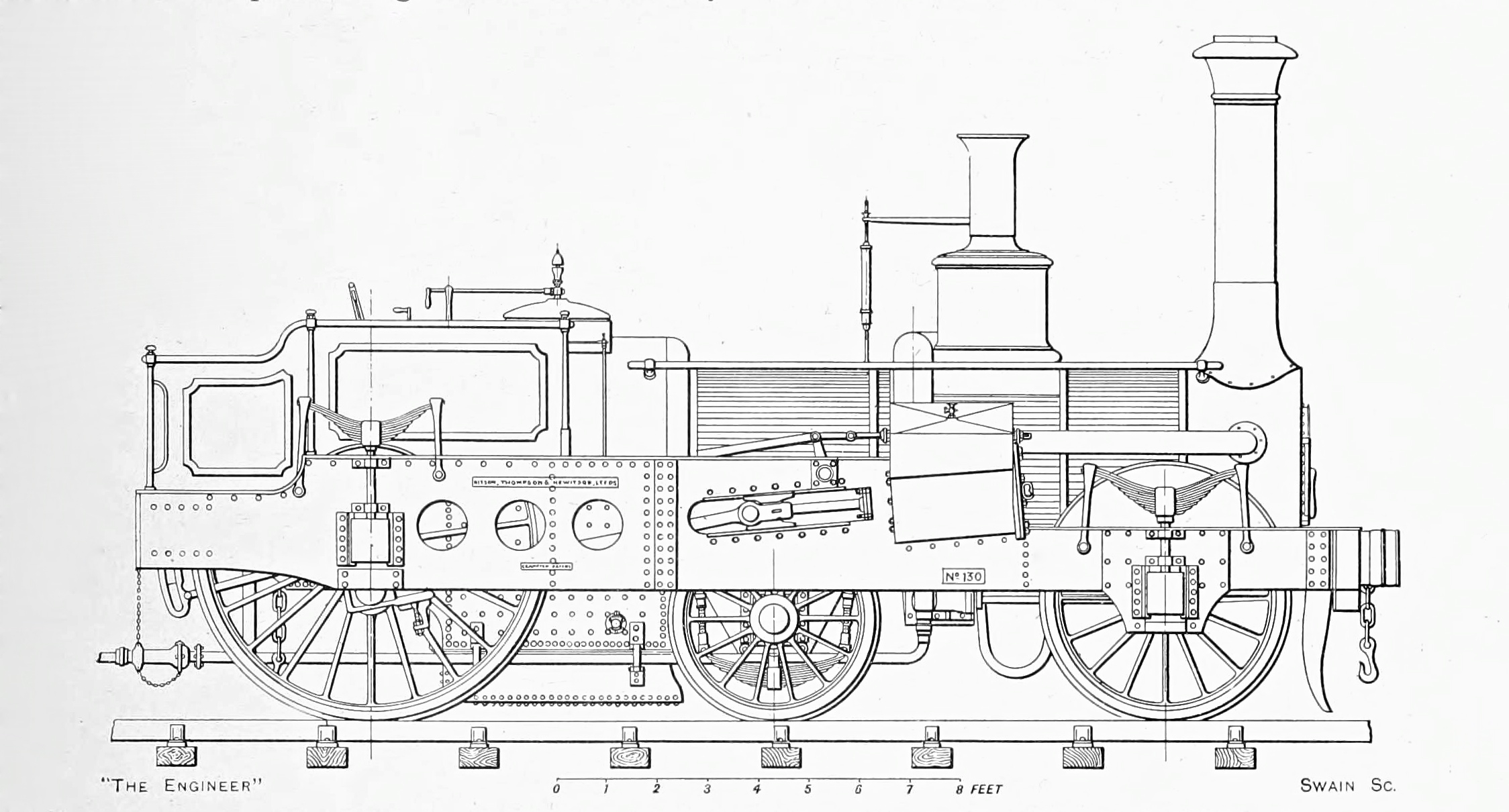
Midland Railway locomotive No 130, built by Kitson, Thompson & Hewitson in 1848

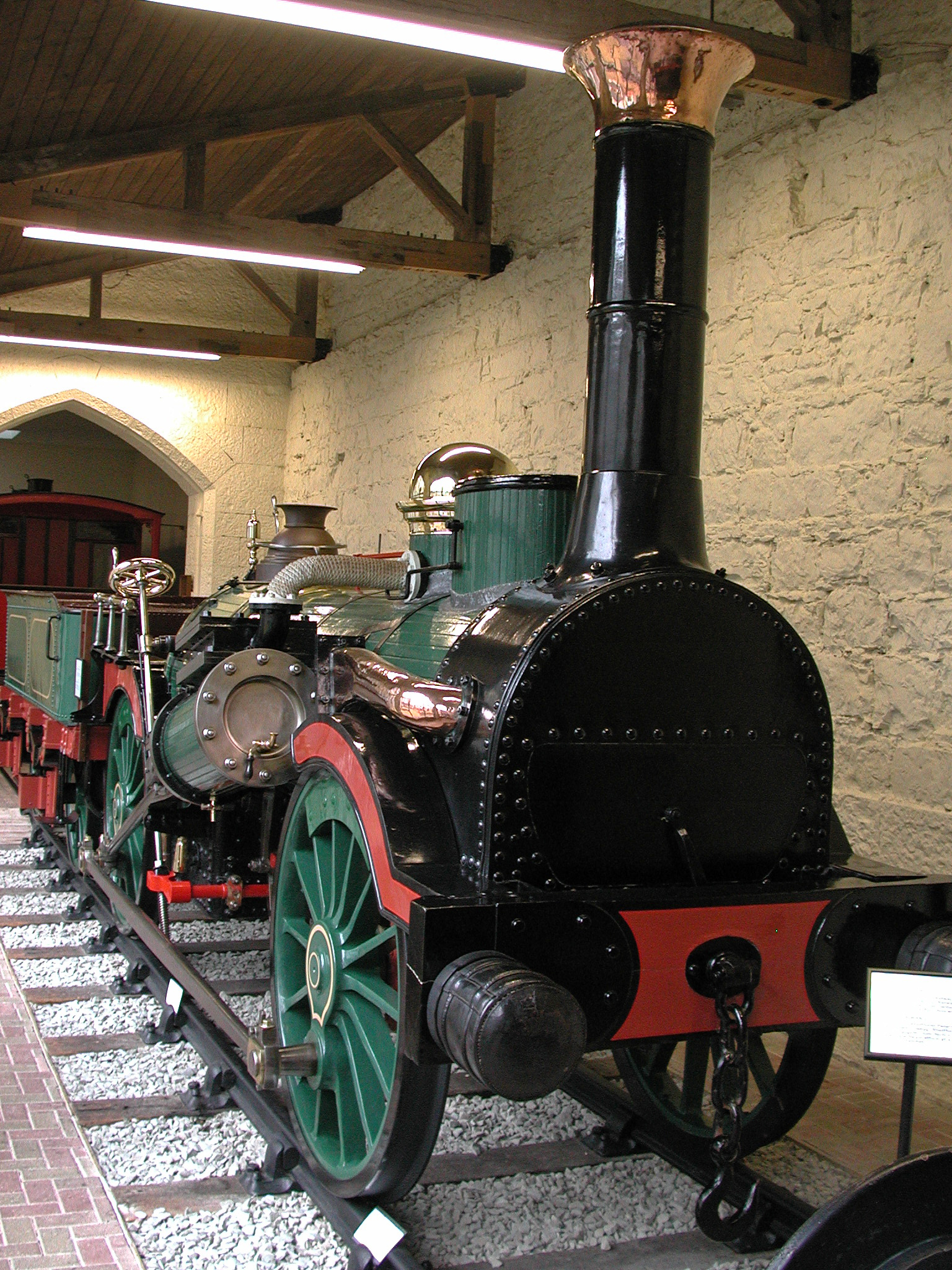
Fire Queen built by A. Horlick & Co. in 1848 for the Padarn Railway, preserved at the Penrhyn Castle Railway Museum

Builder	Works no.	Date built	Railway	Name/no.	Notes
Nasmyth, Gaskell and Company	53	1846	South Eastern Railway	92	(Note: Originally built as a 2-2-2, rebuilt as a Crampton 2+2-2–0 December 1848.)
LNWR Crewe Works	?	1847	London and North Western Railway, Northern Division	176 Courier	
Kitson and Company	?	1848	Midland Railway	130	
Kitson and Company	?	1848	Midland Railway	131	
Timothy Hackworth	?	1848	London, Brighton and South Coast Railway	56	
Timothy Hackworth	?	1848	London, Brighton and South Coast Railway	58	
A. Horlock and Co		1848	Padarn Railway	Fire Queen	(Note: 0-4-0 locomotives, 4 ft (1,219 mm) gauge, Fire Queen preserved at Penrhyn Castle Railway Museum. Jenny Lind named after the opera singer, a friend of Crampton's wife Louisa.)
A. Horlock and Co		1848	Padarn Railway	Jenny Lind	
R. B. Longridge and Company	?	1851	Great Northern Railway	200	(Note: Sources differ on how many Crampton locomotives Longridge built for the Great Northern Railway. Number 200 was later converted from a 4-2-0 to a conventional 2-2-2. There were nine similar 2-2-2 locomotives numbered 91-99 and it is uncertain whether these were built as 2-2-2 or whether they were converted from 4-2-0 like number 200.)

=== Manufactured in France ===
Builder	Works no.	Date built	Railway	Name/no.	Notes
Société Ch.Derosne et Cail	139–150 (12)	1849	Chemins de fer du Nord	122 Crampton to 133 Linné	(Note: First Crampton locomotives in France.)
Société J. F. Cail & Cie	188–199 (12)	1852	Chemins de fer de l'Est	79 Le Globe to 90 L’Amérique	(Note: No. 80 Le Continent preserved in the Cité du Train.)
Société J. F. Cail & Cie	219–230 (12)	1853–54	Chemins de fer du Nord	134 Pradier to 145 Van Eyck	
Société J. F. Cail & Cie	329–340 (12)	1854	Chemin de fer de Paris à Lyon	301 to 312	(Note: Became PLM 1 to 12 from 1857.)
Société J. F. Cail & Cie	387–392 (6)	1855	Chemin de fer de Paris à Lyon	313 to 318	(Note: Became PLM 13 to 18 from 1857.)
Société J. F. Cail & Cie	414–429 (16)	1855	Chemins de fer du Nord	146 Alibert to 161 Volney	
Société J. F. Cail & Cie	544–555 (12)	1857	Chemin de fer de Paris à Lyon	319 La France to 330 La Grèce	(Note: Became PLM 19 to 30 from 1857. Sold to the Chemins de fer de l'Est in 1869 as their 601 to 612.)
Société J. F. Cail & Cie	443	1856	Chemin de fer du Nord	162 Alma	(Note: A 6-2-0 locomotive, converted to the Petiet system in the 1860s, withdrawn and scrapped in 1873.)
Société J. F. Cail & Cie	444	1856	Chemin de fer du Nord	163 Inkerman	
Schneider et Cie	196–210 (15)	1856	Chemins de fer de l'Est	174 Eupatoria to 188 Taganrok	
André Koechlin et Cie	820–829 (10)	1864	Chemins de fer de Paris à Lyon et à la Méditerranée	31 Sylphie to 40 Moucheron	(Note: Last of 30 locomotives built for the P-L between 1855 and 1857, plus 10 locomotives built for the PLM between in 1864.)

=== Manufactured in Germany ===
Builder	Works no.	Date built	Railway	Name/no.	Notes
J. A. Maffei	?–? (4)	1853	Pfälzische Eisenbahnen	26 to 29	(Note: Palatinate Railway 26 to 63.) (Note: 1925-built replica of No. 28 Die Pfälz preserved in Neustadt/Weinstrasse Railway Museum.)
Maschinenbau-Gesellschaft Karlsruhe	3–4 (2)	1854	Baden State Railway	67 Adler and 68 Falke	(Note: Baden IX class locomotives.)
Borsig	553	1854	Sjællandske Jernbane Selskab	Thor	
Borsig	554	1854	Sjællandske Jernbane Selskab	Njord	
Borsig	555	1854	Sjællandske Jernbane Selskab	Baldur	
Borsig	556	1854	Sjællandske Jernbane Selskab	Fenris	
Maschinenbau-Gesellschaft Karlsruhe	5–9, 11–12, 10 (8)	1854–56	Baden State Railway	69 Comet to 76 Basel	
Borsig	557	1855	Sjællandske Jernbane Selskab	Skirner	
Borsig	558	1855	Sjællandske Jernbane Selskab	Vidar	
Maschinenfabrik Esslingen	?–? (14)	1855–63	Pfälzische Eisenbahnen	36–41, 46–49, 60–63	
Ausbesserungswerk Karlsruhe	— (3)	1856	Baden State Railway	1, 2, and 4	(Note: Baden I c class locomotives.)
J. A. Maffei	?–? (12)	1857–58	Bayerische Ostbahn	A1 to A12	(Note: Bavarian B IX (Ostbahn). Rebuilt as 2-4-0 locomotives (1869–71))
Maschinenfabrik Esslingen	424	1858	Sjællandske Jernbane Selskab	H.C. Ørsted	
Maschinenbau-Gesellschaft Karlsruhe	74–77, 89-92 (8)	1858–59	Baden State Railway	83 Rheinfelden to 90 Pfalz	
Maschinenbau-Gesellschaft Karlsruhe	195–202 (8)	1863	Baden State Railway	7 Badenia to 14 Offenburg	(Note: Phoenix of this series in service until 1903, length 12.90 metres (42 ft 4 in), top speed 120 kilometres per hour (75 mph), weight 28½ tonnes. Preserved in the Deutsches Bundesbahn Museum, Nuremberg.)

== See also ==
- Long Boiler locomotive
- 6-2-0 for Crampton locomotives in the USA

== Sources ==
- Baxter, Bertram (1978). Baxter, David (ed.). British Locomotive Catalogue 1825–1923. Vol. 2A: London and North Western Railway and its constituent companies. Ashbourne, Derbyshire: Moorland Publishing Company. ISBN 0-903485-51-6.
- Bradley, D. L. (1960). The Locomotives of the London, Chatham and Dover Railway. Railway Correspondence and Travel Society.
- Bradley, D. L. (1963). The Locomotives of the South Eastern Railway. Railway Correspondence and Travel Society.
- Davies, John (July 2001). Chemins de fer de l’Est Locomotive List 1839–1938 (Third ed.). Woodbridge, Queensland: Dr. John Davies. ISBN 0-646-06600-5.
- Davies, John (January 1997). Chemins de fer du Nord Locomotive List 1842–1938. Sunnybank, Queensland: Dr. John Davies. ISBN 0-646-30938-2.
- Davies, John (1996). Chemins de fer P. L. M. and Constituents Locomotive List 1829–1938. Sunnybank, Queensland: Dr. John Davies. ISBN 0-646-15102-9.
- Lohr, Hermann; Thielmann, Georg (1988). Lokomotiven badischer Eisenbahnen (EFA 2.7) (in German). Düsseldorf: Alba. ISBN 3-87094-118-9.
- Sharman, M. (1983). The Crampton Locomotive. Oakwood Press. ISBN 0-9509067-0-0.
