= Fire Queen =

Steam locomotive

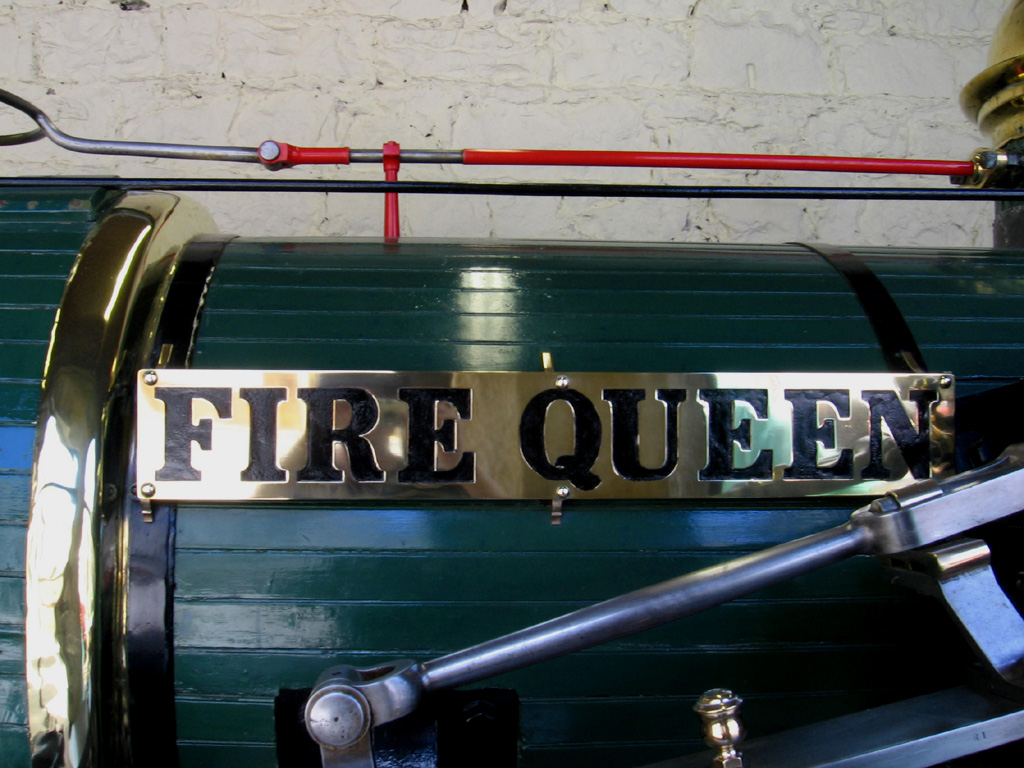
Type and origin
- Power type: Steam
- Build date: 1848
Specifications
- Configuration
  - Whyte: 0-4-0
- Gauge: 4 ft (1,219 mm)
- Cylinders: 2
Career
- Operators: Padarn Railway
- Retired: 1886
- Current owner: Penrhyn Castle Railway Museum
- Disposition: Static display

Fire Queen is an early steam locomotive built by A. Horlock and Co in 1848 for the Padarn Railway. It is the only surviving locomotive from that railway, and it is preserved at the Vale of Rheidol Railway.

== History ==
Fire Queen was one of two identical locomotives built for the Padarn Railway, which connected the Dinorwic Quarry near Llanberis in north Wales with the port at Y Felinheli. The railway was opened in 1840 using horses to pull the slate trains. It replaced the even earlier Dinorwic Railway which opened in 1824.

The two locomotives, Fire Queen and Jenny Lind, were built by marine engineers A. Horlock and Co. They were the only railway locomotives built by this company. The locomotives were based on an 1847 patent of Thomas Crampton, which specified a locomotive with driving wheels positioned at the ends of the boiler driven by steeply inclined cylinders placed between the wheels. The locomotives lacked a frame, and the wheels and cylinders were attached directly to the boiler.

They were delivered to the railway in 1848 and continued working until 1886. Jenny Lind was scrapped, but Fire Queen was placed in a small shed at the quarry workshop, Gilfach Ddu. It stayed there until the quarry closed in 1969 at which time it was sold to John Smith MP and loaned to the nearby Penrhyn Castle Railway Museum. It remained on display there until January 2024, when it was moved to the Vale of Rheidol Railway.

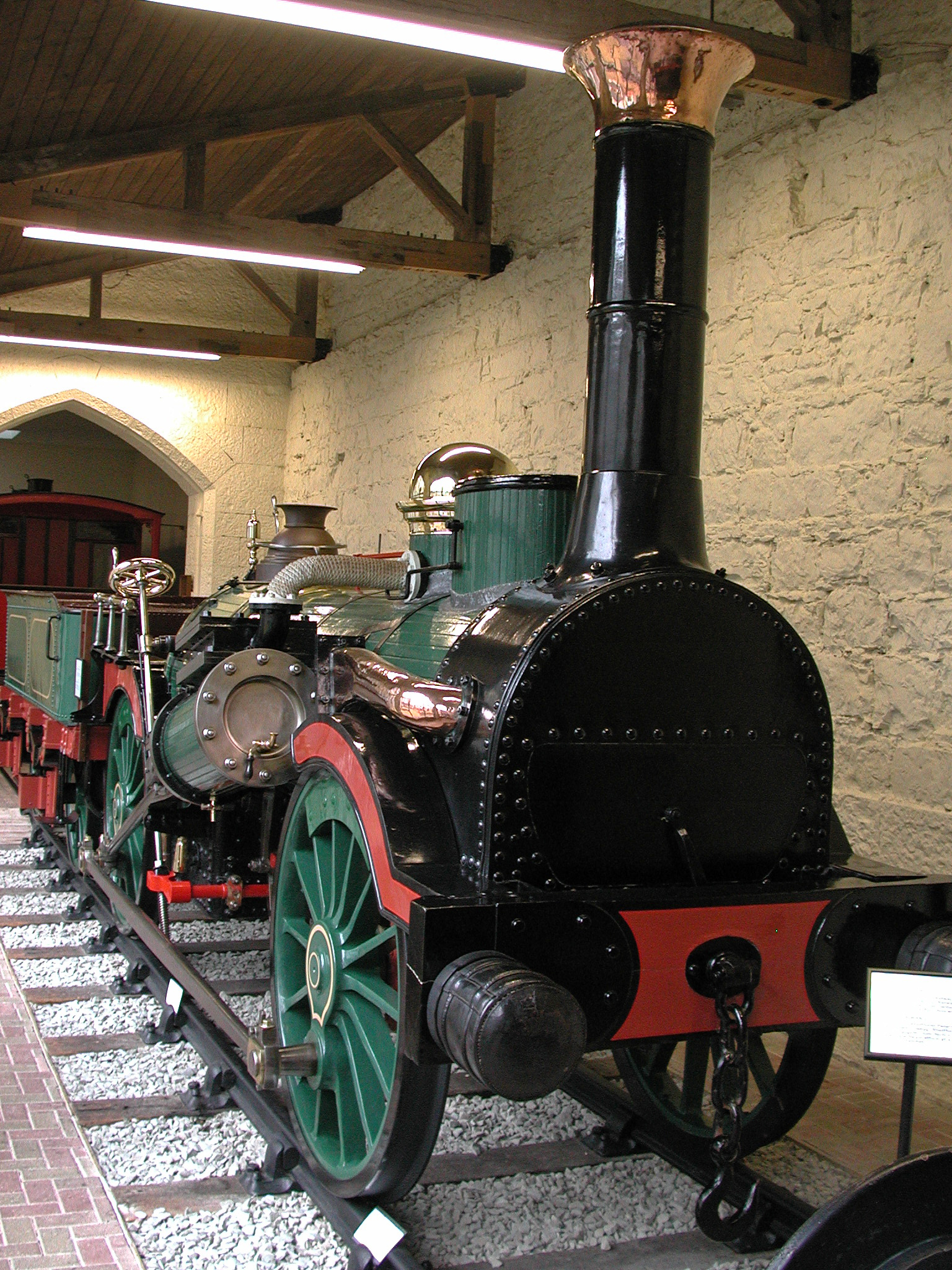
Fire Queen in Penrhyn Castle Railway Museum

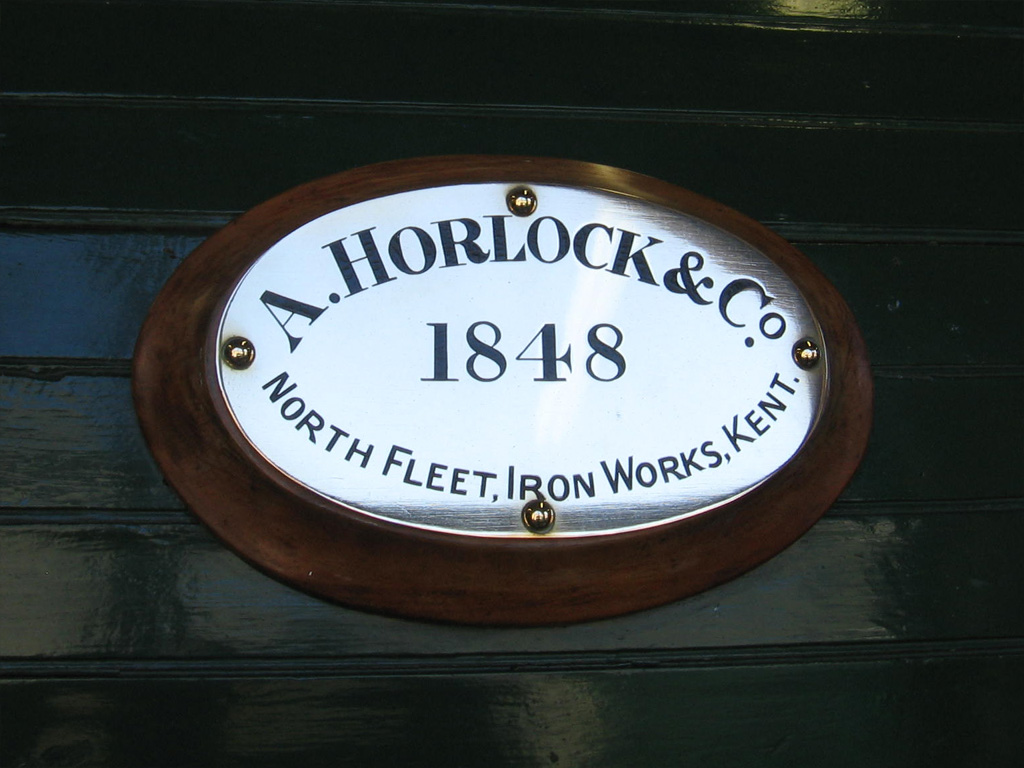
Fire Queen's Builders Plate

Fire Queen at Penrhyn Castle, 2023

Big End

Eccentrics

Expansion Link

Cylinder Backend

whistle

Crank on Driving Wheel

Spoke

Wooden Brake shoe

Rear of her Tender

Nameplate (2023)(compared to the previous image, it’s taken from an iPhone and there’s a bit of dirt on Fire Queen)
