= Horlock =

Horlock is a surname. Notable people with the surname include:

- Alfred Horlock (born 1822) British engineer
- Brian Horlock (born 1931), British Anglican priest
- Ernest George Horlock (1885–1917), British Army soldier and Victoria Cross recipient
- John Horlock (born 1928), British engineer
- Kevin Horlock (born 1972), English-born Northern Ireland footballer

== See also ==
- A. Horlock and Co, a British marine and locomotive engineering company
