= 6-2-0 =

Locomotive wheel arrangement

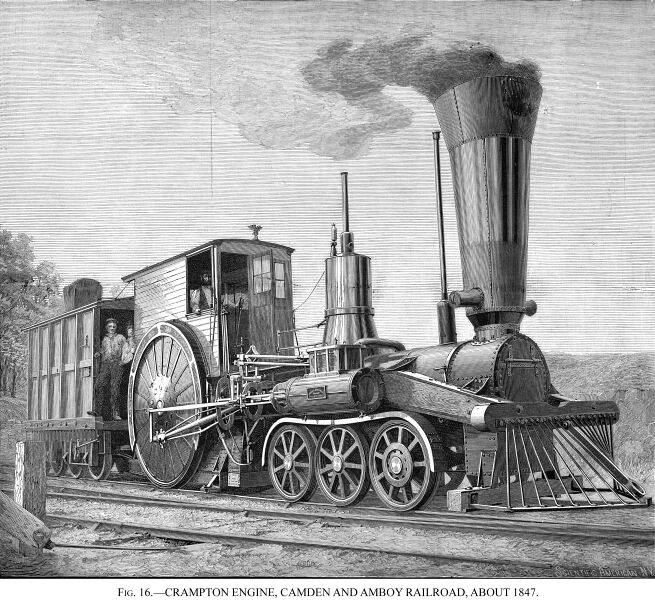
A drawing of a C&A 6-2-0, c. 1847.

In the Whyte notation, a 6-2-0 is a railroad steam locomotive that has an unpowered three-axle leading truck followed by a single powered driving axle. This wheel arrangement is associated with the Crampton locomotive type, and in the USA the single class were sometimes referred to as Cramptons.

Other equivalent classifications are:

UIC classification: 3A (also known as German classification and Italian classification)
French classification: 310
Turkish classification: 14
Swiss classification: 1/4

== Overview ==
The 6-2-0 was a most unusual wheel arrangement, where the bulk of the locomotive's weight was on the unpowered leading wheels rather than the powered driving wheels, therefore giving poor adhesion, and the long wheelbase did not help it gain popularity either. The type was only practicable on the Crampton locomotive with a low boiler and large driving wheels placed behind the firebox.

== Usage ==
=== United Kingdom ===
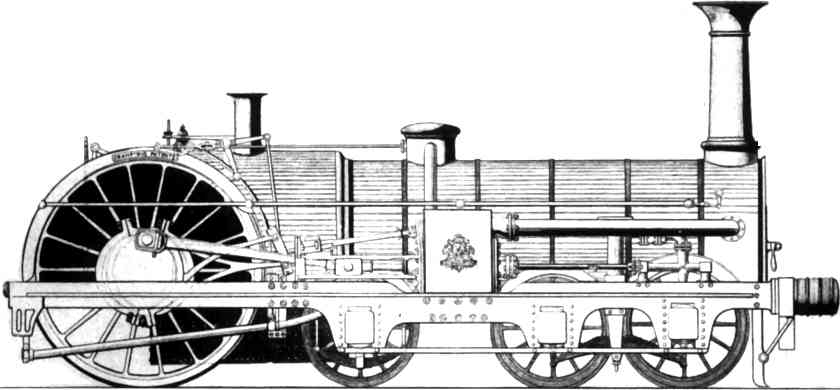
A drawing of the LNWR Liverpool without her tender

The only British 6-2-0 was the locomotive Liverpool built in 1848 by Bury, Curtis, and Kennedy for the London and North Western Railway. It was exhibited at The Great Exhibition in 1851 and was moderately successful with 48 hp (36 kW), large driving wheels and high top speed for the time. However despite being able to haul heavy expresses over long distances no more were built due to its long, fixed wheelbase damaging track on curves.

=== United States ===
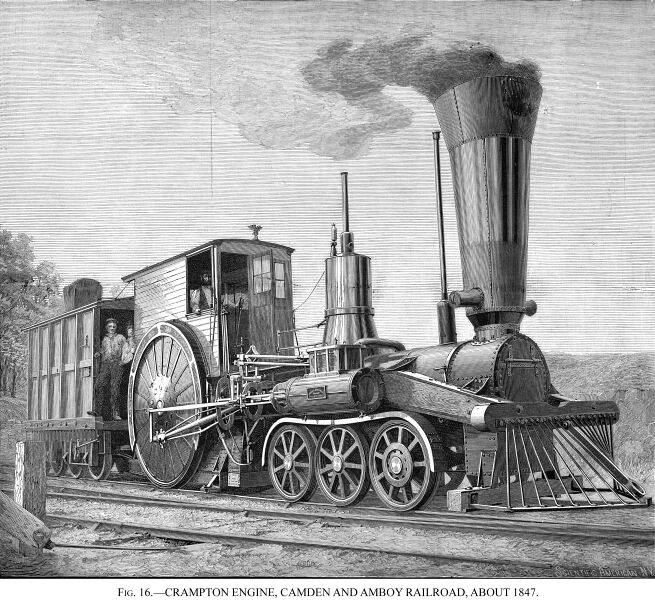
One of the American Cramptons, incorrectly dated to 1847

On a trip to England, Robert L. Stevens, president of the Camden and Amboy (C&A) railroad, saw demonstrations of Crampton locomotives on the railways there, most likely of the LNWR's Bury-built "Liverpool". When he returned in 1848, Stevens asked his master mechanic Isaac Dripps to build him a 6-2-0 for use on the C&A. The specifications for the first 6-2-0 included a 38 in (0.97 m) diameter boiler that would burn anthracite coal and 96 in (2.4 m) driving wheels.

Designing a locomotive to burn coal, which was still fairly expensive and difficult to obtain, was unusual for the time. The majority of locomotives of the 1830s and 1840s were built to burn wood, which was plentiful, cheap and very easy to obtain along the railroad. As well as its cost, coal required a larger firebox in which to burn.

The first of three locomotives based on these specifications, named John Stevens after Robert's father, was completed in 1849. Dripps was uncertain that the locomotive would translate to American railroads, and his reservations turned out to be correct. The locomotive's tractive effort was insufficient for long term or heavy work, most of its weight was on the unpowered lead axles, and the C&A's track was neither built nor modified to handle the high speeds these engines were built for. Almost a century passed before a six-wheel leading truck was used again, on the PRR S1 and S2.

The C&A's management, however, thought it performed well enough to order two more for passenger service. It was claimed they could reach 60 mph (97 km/h) when other fast trains reached only 40 mph (64 km/h). They were later rebuilt to 4-4-0s and in use as late as 1865.
