= Gilfach Ddu =

Building in Llanberis, Gwynedd, Wales

Coordinates: 53.1210°N 4.1152°W

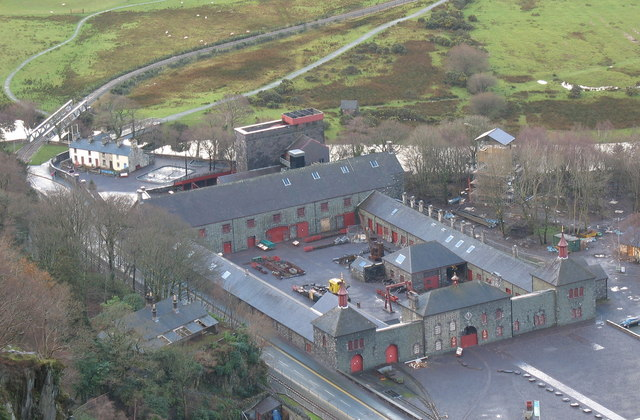
The National Slate Museum, built in the repurposed Dinorwic slate quarry workshops

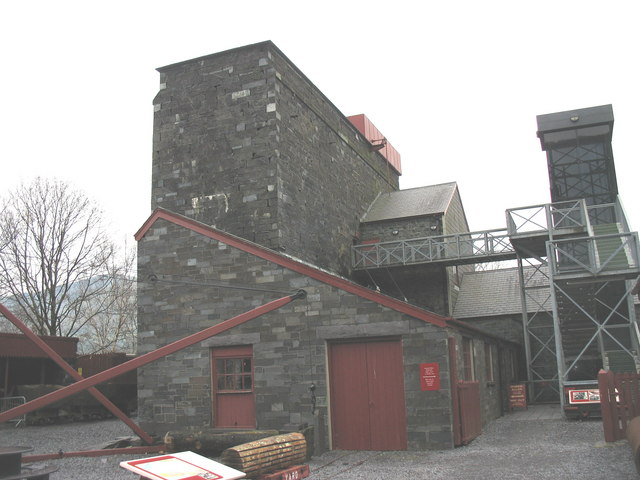
The building containing the large De Winton waterwheel

Gilfach Ddu (also known as the Dinorwic Slate Quarry Workshops) are a series of well-preserved Grade I listed industrial buildings built to serve the Dinorwic slate quarry near Llanberis in Caernarfonshire, North Wales. The workshops compreise a complex of repair and maintenance buildings, that were built in 1870 to build and maintain the machinery used in the quarry. The complex includes saw sheds, patternmaking shops, a foundry with cupola, blacksmiths shops, fitting shops, stores, engine sheds, a canteen, the chief engineer's house, a hand operated crane and two waterwheels which provided the site with its power. Since 1972, the buildings have housed the National Slate Museum.

== History ==
Quarrying started at Dinorwic around 1700, under the ownership of the Assheton-Smith family. In 1787 however, the area was leased to a group of English industrialists, who established the current Dinorwic quarry, building the first incline of the quarry in 1790.

Transporting slate from Dinorwic was initially highly cumbersome, involving carting it down a steep road to the nearby Llyn Padarn before shipping it downriver to the sea. Proper development was prevented by the tax increases caused by the outbreak of war between England and France in 1792. In the 1830s, an extensive narrow-gauge tramway system was built within the quarry. The horse-worked 2 ft (610 mm) gauge Dinorwic Railway was built in 1824, connecting the quarry to the coast at Port Dinorwic. This was replaced in 1843 by the 4 ft (1,219 mm) gauge Padarn Railway running along the shore of Llyn Padarn and on to Port Dinorwic. In 1848, steam locomotives were introduced on the railway.

Between 1869 and 1870, the workshops were built at the north end of the Padarn Railway. They were constructed on land reclaimed from the lake using waste slate from the quarry. That same year, steam locomotives were introduced within the quarry when an order was placed with the Hunslet Engine Company. They produced Dinorwic (works number 51 of 1870), which is a clear precursor to the Alice class locomotives that became the mainstay of the quarry fleet.

The original waterwheel that powered the complex was built by the Caernarfon firm of De Winton in 1870, and remained in use until 1926, when it was replaced by a Pelton wheel turbine. Both waterwheels are still in place at the site. By 1890, the quarry was the second most productive slate quarry in the world, after the nearby Penrhyn quarry. The site remained in use until 1969, when the quarry and workshops were shut down.

== National Slate Museum ==
At the auction of the quarry in December 1969, the workshops were purchased by Carnarvonshire County Council to house the North Wales Quarrying Museum. This opened on 26 May 1972. It is now named the National Slate Museum of Wales.

== Architecture ==
The complex is built around a quadrangular yard, derived more from agricultural than industrial practice, and is unusual as it was built to be decorative as well as practical. This is likely because it was built to make an impression on any of the owners’ guests. Gwyn described it as:

...a remarkably strident assertion of patrician power... with a clock over the entrance, a tower at the corners, each with a pyramidal slate roof crowned by a cupola, with a hipped central gatehouse with a smaller cupola.

Much of the architecture is of the classical style, though also possessing Gothic decorative elements, particularly for the cast-iron windows that were purpose built for the foundry. The styling is therefore both distinctive and unique. The De Winton waterwheel, which has recently been restored by the National Museum of Wales, is the second largest in Britain at 15.4 metres (51 ft).
