= National Slate Museum =

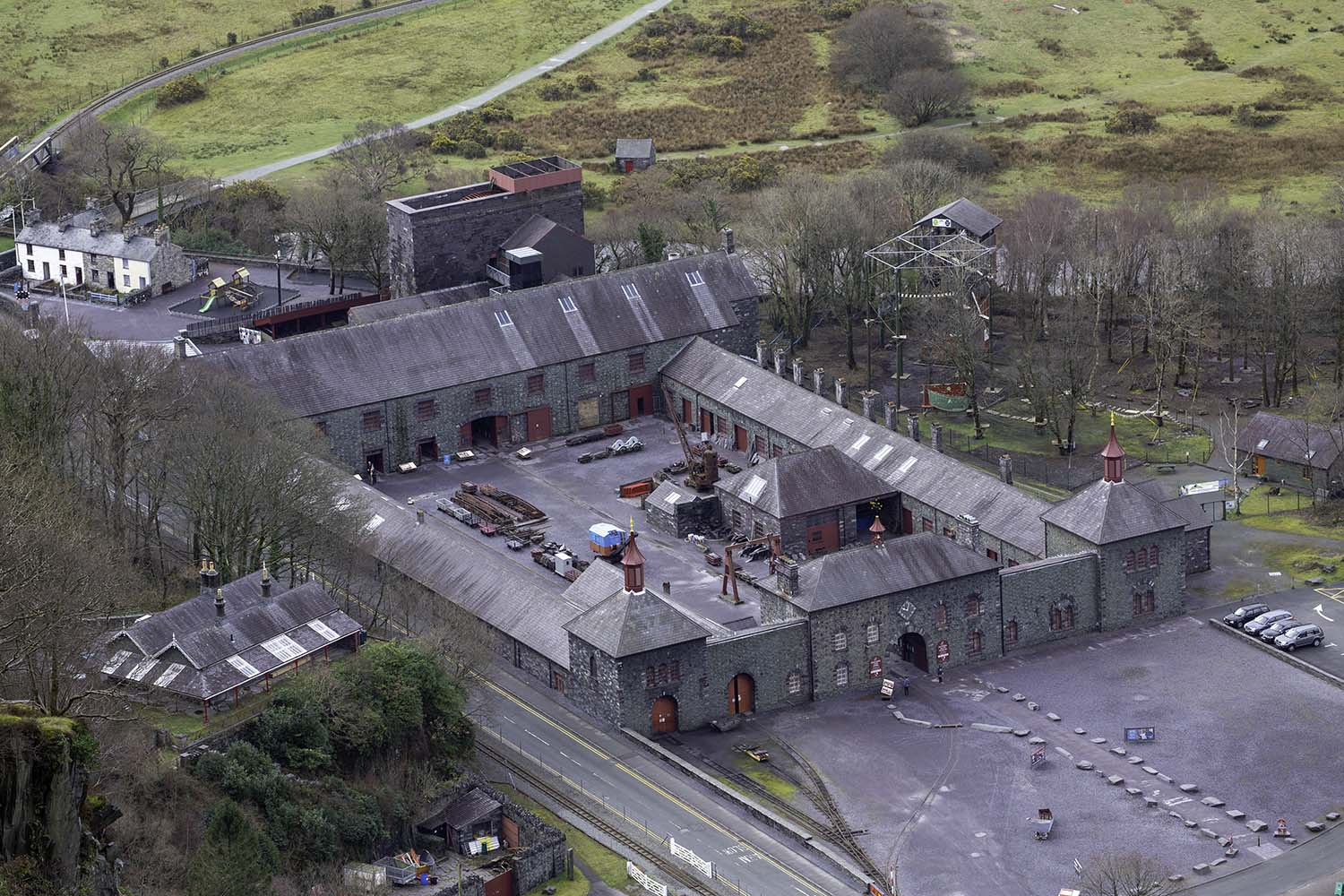

- Location within Gwynedd
- Established: 1972
- Location: Llanberis, Gwynedd, Wales
- Coordinates: 53.1210°N 4.11510°W
- Type: Mining museum
- Website: National Slate Museum]

The great water wheel inside the museum

The National Slate Museum (previously known as the Welsh Slate Museum and the North Wales Quarrying Museum) is located at Gilfach Ddu, the 19th-century workshops of the now disused Dinorwic quarry, within the Padarn Country Park, Llanberis, Gwynedd. The museum is dedicated to the preservation and display of relicts of the Slate industry in Wales. The museum closed in November 2024 for renovations and will not re-open until 2027.

The museum is an anchor point of the European Route of Industrial Heritage (ERIH) and part of Amgueddfa Cymru – Museum Wales.

== History ==
The workshops which served the needs of the quarry and its locomotives, were built in 1870 on land created from the continuous tipping of spoil from the adjacent Vivian Quarry, and as a replacement for the store sheds which were previously sited there. Rail access to the works was by both 1 ft 11 1/2 in (597 mm) narrow gauge (the quarry gauge) and 4 ft (1,219 mm) narrow gauge (that of the Padarn Railway which carried the slate from the quarry to Port Dinorwic). Rails also entered the main yard through the main entrance.

The quarry closed in 1969 and the site was opened on 25 May 1972 as the North Wales Quarrying Museum.

The museum is now connected to the nearby village of Llanberis by the Llanberis Lake Railway, which uses part of the building as its workshops.

The museum reopened after receiving a £1.6 million grant from the Heritage Lottery Fund and now has displays featuring Victorian era slateworkers' cottages that once stood at Tanygrisiau, near Blaenau Ffestiniog. They were taken down stone by stone and re-erected on the site. The museum includes the multi-media display, To Steal a Mountain, showing the lives and work of the men who quarried slate here.

The museum also has the largest working waterwheel in mainland Britain, which is available for viewing via several walkways. The waterwheel was constructed in 1870 by De Winton of Caernarfon and is 50 ft 5 in (15.37 m) in diameter, 5 ft 3 in (1.60 m) wide and was built around a 12 in (305 mm) axle. Close to the museum is the partly restored Vivian incline, a gravity balance incline where loaded slate wagons haul empty wagons back up.

The museum closed in November 2024 for renovations and will not re-open until 2027.

== Locomotives ==
The museum owns a number of locomotives from Welsh quarries

Name	Builder	Type	Works number	Date	Notes	Image
Una	Hunslet	0-4-0ST	873	1905	Built for the Pen-yr-Orsedd Quarry.	
	Brush	4wBE		1917	Built for munitions work during the First World War. Later worked at Aberllefenni Slate Quarry. Now restored to working condition.	
	W. J. Williams	4wPM			Converted motorcycle, built at the Oakeley Slate Quarry to ride on the quarry tramways.	
Cilgwyn	Ruston and Hornsby	4wDM			ex-Cilgwyn quarry locomotive	
