= A. Horlock and Co =

British engineering company

A. Horlock and Co.
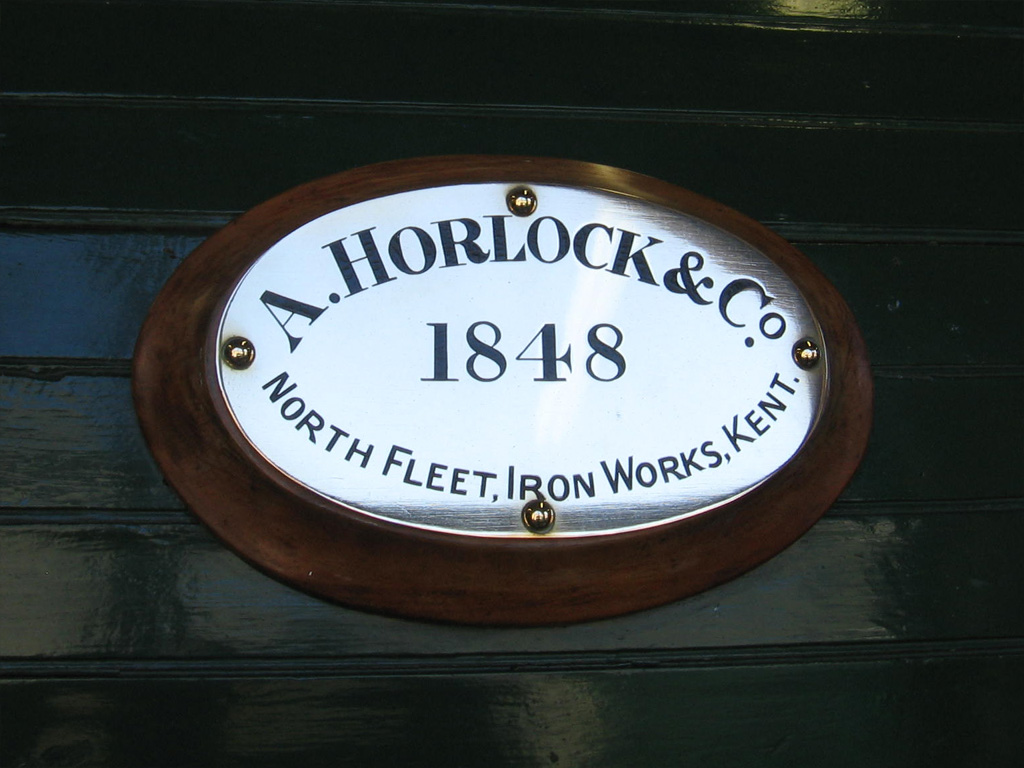
- Industry: Engineering
- Founded: 1847
- Founder: Alfred Horlock
- Defunct: July 1853
- Headquarters: Northfleet, United Kingdom
- Products: Steam locomotives, Steam engines and marine equipment

A. Horlock and Co. was a marine and locomotive engineering company based in Northfleet in Kent.

== History ==
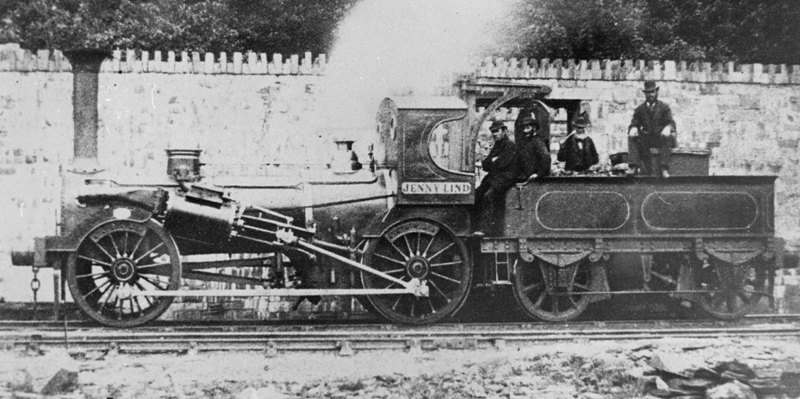
Locomotive Jenny Lind built by A. Horlock and Co in 1848 for the Padarn Railway

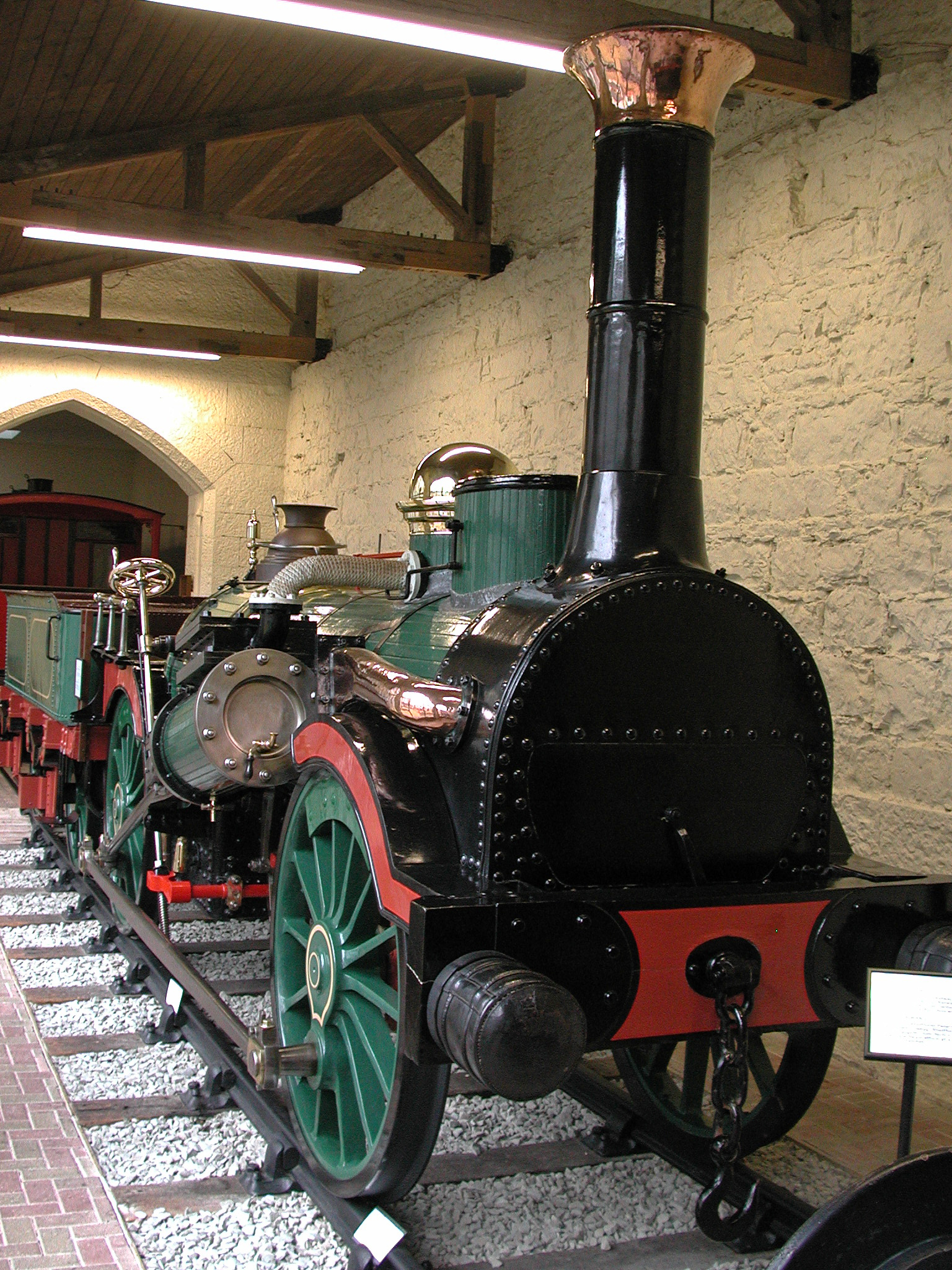
Fire Queen of the Padarn Railway preserved at the Penrhyn Castle Railway Museum

The company was founded at Northfleet in Kent in 1847 by Alfred Horlock. He leased land formerly owned by his uncle on which the Poynder & Medlicott "Lime Works" factory stood and built a new foundry, named the Northfleet Ironworks. The company mainly manufactured marine equipment and steam engines.

In 1848, the Dinorwic Quarry in North Wales ordered two 4 ft (1,219 mm) gauge steam locomotives from Horlock. These were amongst the earliest Crampton locomotives built and were the only locomotives built by Horlock. They were named Fire Queen and Jenny Lind. In 1850, the company produced a schooner for the Channel Islands and France Steam Navigation Company. The boat was powered by two 20 hp steam engines and was made primarily of malleable iron.

Alfred Horlock testified at the 1849 Parliamentary commission inquiring into the application of iron for railway bridges and other structures. A. Horlock and Co suffered a series of robberies in 1851. The company was declared bankrupt in July 1853 and the factory was auctioned to shipbuilders Bell, Wells & Co, who resold it in 1857.

== Surviving products ==
The steam locomotive Fire Queen, built in 1848, is on display at the Penrhyn Castle Railway Museum near Bangor in North Wales.
