= Padarn Railway =

Former railway in Gwynedd, Wales

Coordinates: 53.1455°N 4.1706°W

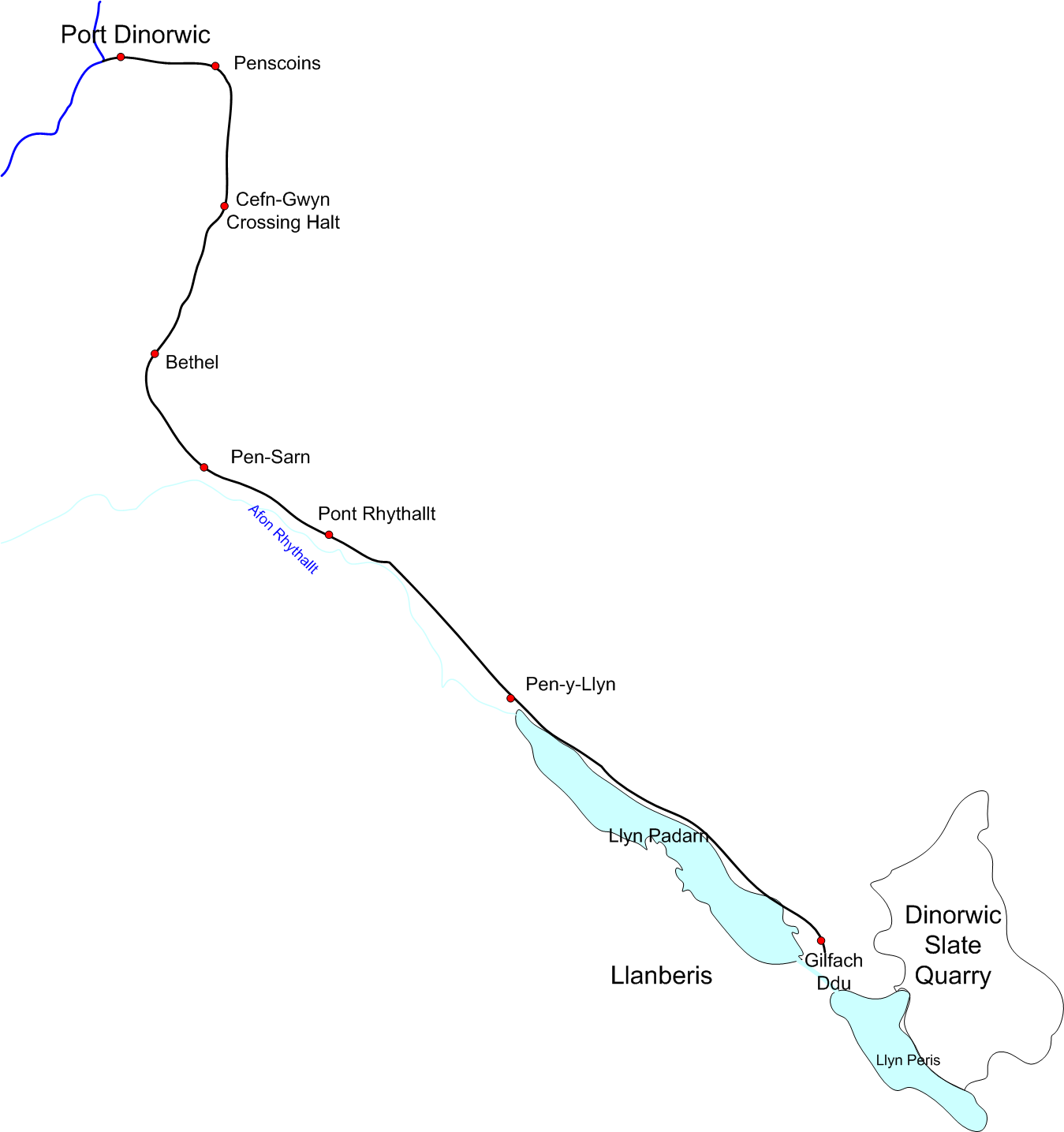
- Map of the Padarn Railway

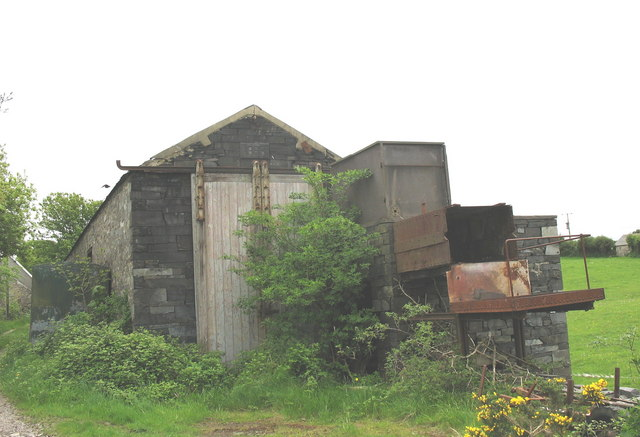
- The Padarn Railway locomotive shed at Penscoins in 2005

Overview
- Headquarters: Llanberis
- Locale: Wales
- Dates of operation: 1843–1961
- Successor: Llanberis Lake Railway

Technical
- Track gauge: 4 ft (1,219 mm)
- Track length: 7 mi (11 km)

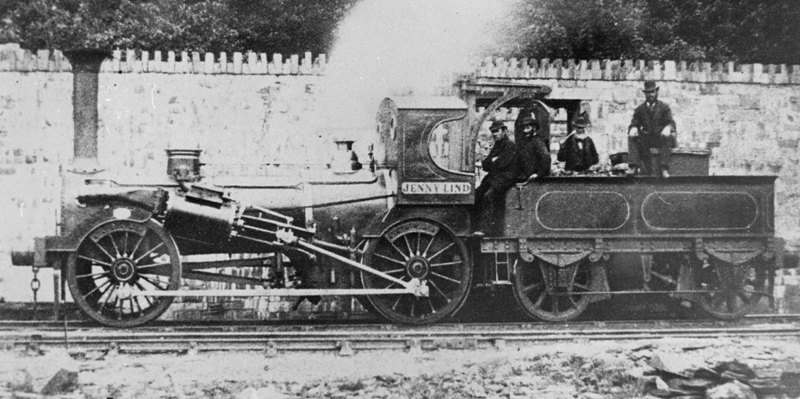
Padarn Railway locomotive Jenny Lind

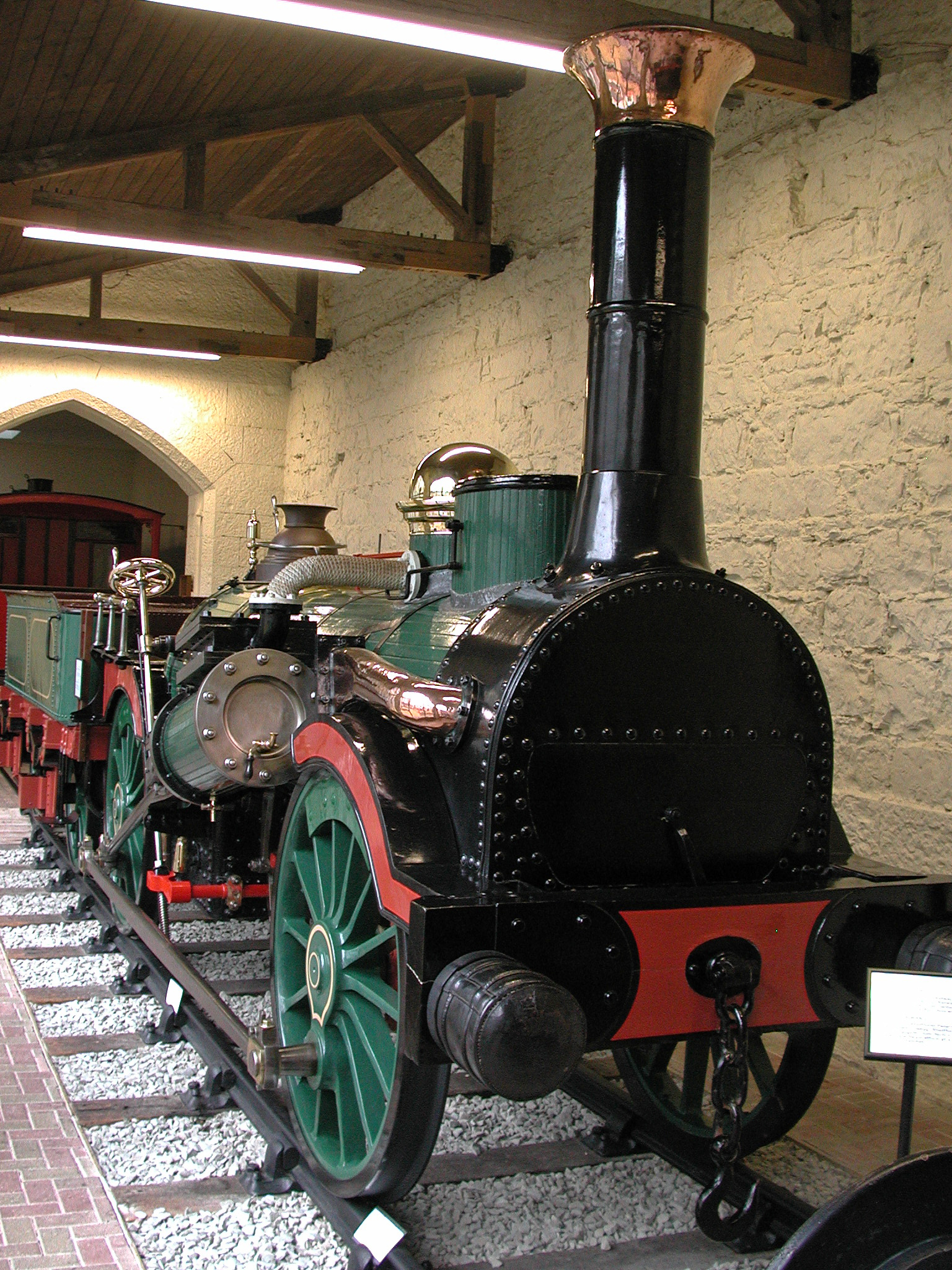
The preserved Padarn Railway locomotive Fire Queen when it was displayed at the Penrhyn Castle Railway Museum

The Padarn Railway was a narrow-gauge railway in North Wales, built to the unusual gauge of 4 ft (1,219 mm). It carried slate seven miles (11 km) from Dinorwic Quarry to Port Dinorwic. The line opened on 3 March 1843, replacing the Dinorwic Railway. It initially used horses, but was converted to steam haulage on 23 November 1848. The railway was formally titled the Dinorwic Quarries Railway or Dinorwic Quarry Railway, but informally "Padarn Railway" was widely used.

The railway officially closed on 3 November 1961. The locomotive Dinorwic performed the last practical services by hauling the track-lifting trains.

== Transporter wagons ==
An unusual feature of the railway was the transporter wagons, also referred to as "Host wagons" and to the workmen by the English names "Big Cars" or "Large Trolleys". These 4 ft (1,219 mm) gauge vehicles were flat wagons with two parallel "Quarry Gauge" – 1 ft 10 3/4 in (578 mm) – tracks on them. Without loads these vehicles resembled modern day "Container Flats". Loaded Quarry Gauge slate wagons were wheeled onto the transporter wagons and carried four per transporter wagon down to their destination at Penscoins, above Port Dinorwic, where they were wheeled off again onto a Quarry Gauge rope-hauled (until May 1924 chain-hauled) incline which led down, partly through a tunnel, to the quayside.

== Workmen's transport ==
As with many other aspects of the Industrial Revolution, the rapid growth of slate quarrying required a lot of labour concentrated in small areas where, typically, little had been needed before. This required new or expanded towns, commuting, or both. Llanberis grew considerably through the first part of the 19th century, but not sufficiently to keep pace with the opportunities the quarries offered.

The first "mass transport" commuting to and from Dinorwic's quarries was by boat across Llyn Peris and, especially, Llyn Padarn, with an estimated 26 boats involved. "Weekly commuting" began and lasted until the Second World War, notably by "The Anglesey Men" who crossed the Menai Strait from Craig-y-Don to Port Dinorwic on Mondays, lodged in "barracks" at the quarry and returned home on Saturday afternoons.

It was common across North Wales for quarry owners to tolerate the widespread practice among quarry workers to devise rail vehicles to get to, from and around work. Such vehicles were known generally as "ceir gwyllt" or "wild cars". Dinorwic was no exception. From 1850 at the latest men were permitted to travel to and from work along the Padarn Railway using "velocipedes" – large, four-wheeled trucks propelled by foot ("car cicio" in Welsh, "kicking car" in English) or hand power ("car troi" - "turning car"). Similar contraptions later became famous in early comic silent movies. Each was owned by a syndicate of men, though an "outsider" might fill a vacant seat for 6d a week. Men were known to race (akin to Bumps in boat races) at speeds of up to 40 mph (64 km/h) and accidents happened.

It is highly likely that men also travelled the line unofficially, riding on wagons. In February 1892 this practice became formalised – quarrybound before the first shift on a Monday morning and homebound after the last shift on a Saturday; expressly at the rider's own risk. These trains consisted of around thirty transporter wagons with a full set of slate wagons on top, on which the men sat back to back, facing outwards.

By the 1890s, the number of men, distances travelled, the example of the Penrhyn Railway and rising expectations led the men to ask the quarry management to provide trains to convey them to and from work. The company was reluctant to entertain the idea, seeming to fear burdensome liabilities in case of accident more than the cost and effort of providing such a service. Nevertheless, after three years of discussion the company decided to run "proper" trains and set about the task professionally. They originally placed an order with the Gloucester Railway Carriage and Wagon Company for four four-wheeled brake carriages each capable of seating 58 passengers and 15 matching carriages each capable of seating 60 passengers. The order for carriages was subsequently raised to nineteen, each bearing a single letter. The company built stations at all stopping places except Cefn Gwyn Crossing Halt and Crawia Halts (also known as Pont-Rhythallt Mill West Halt and Pont-Rhythallt Mill East Halt).

A timetable was devised with an elaborate allocation of numbers of men set to travel from each stop. Notices and a rule book were issued with severe penalties for, among other things, allowing non-employees to travel or using offensive language. A rate was set for a weekly "season ticket" for daily travel, ranging downwards from half a crown (2s. 6d.) for travel over the full length of the line. On the homeward (northbound) run specific carriages were dropped off at specific stations, such as Pen-Llyn, where the men in them hand shunted them into a purpose-built carriage shed before walking to their homes. The process was reversed the following working morning. The overall journey time for the little over six miles (9.7 km) was 45 minutes.

The workmen's service commenced operating on Monday 25 November 1895 and last ran on 8 November 1947, by which time it was down to three carriages – K, Q and U. The charges for using Coach "U" were higher than the other coaches, but the reasons why have been forgotten.

Workman's carriage tokens:

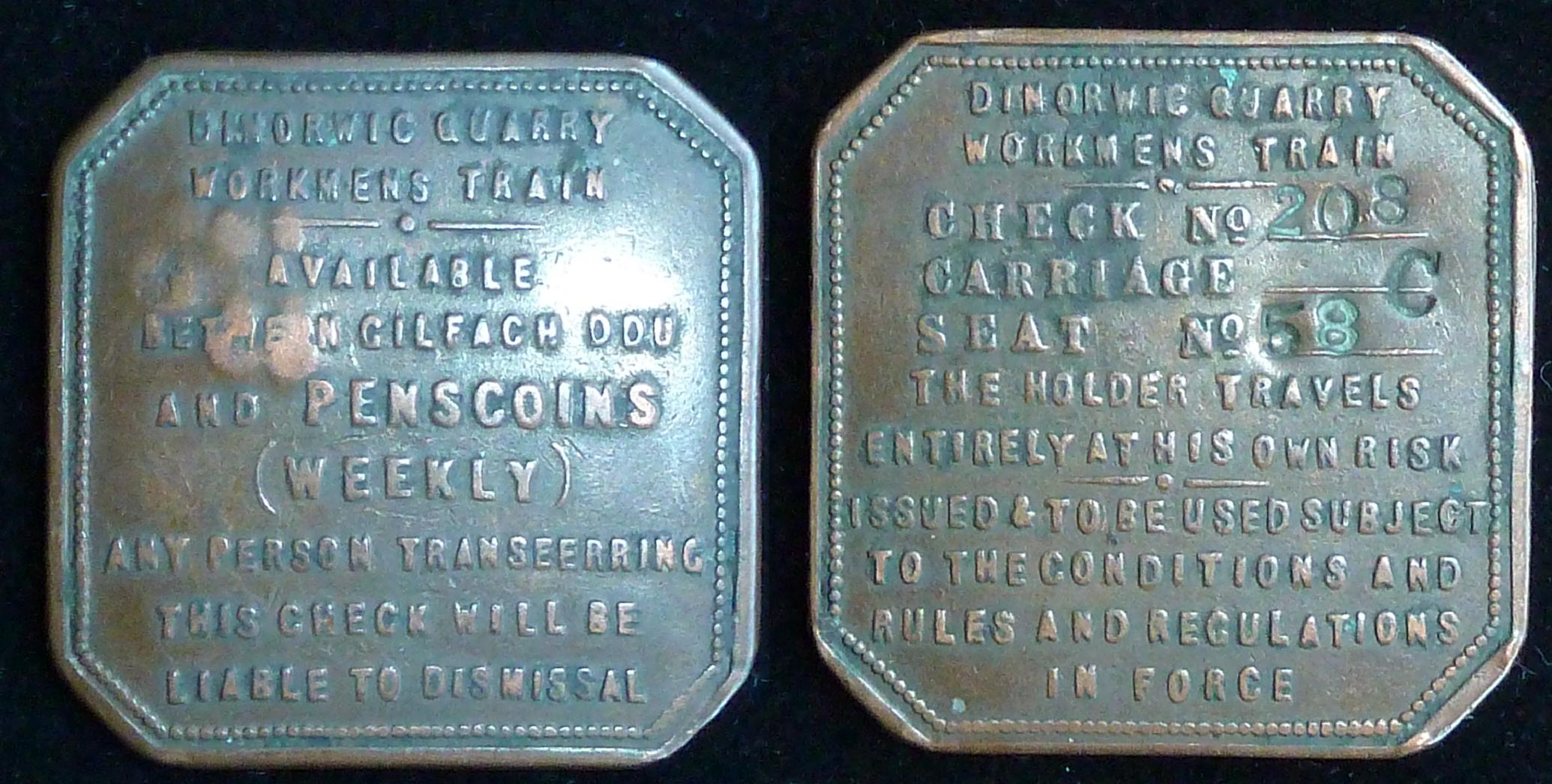
Penscoins weekly

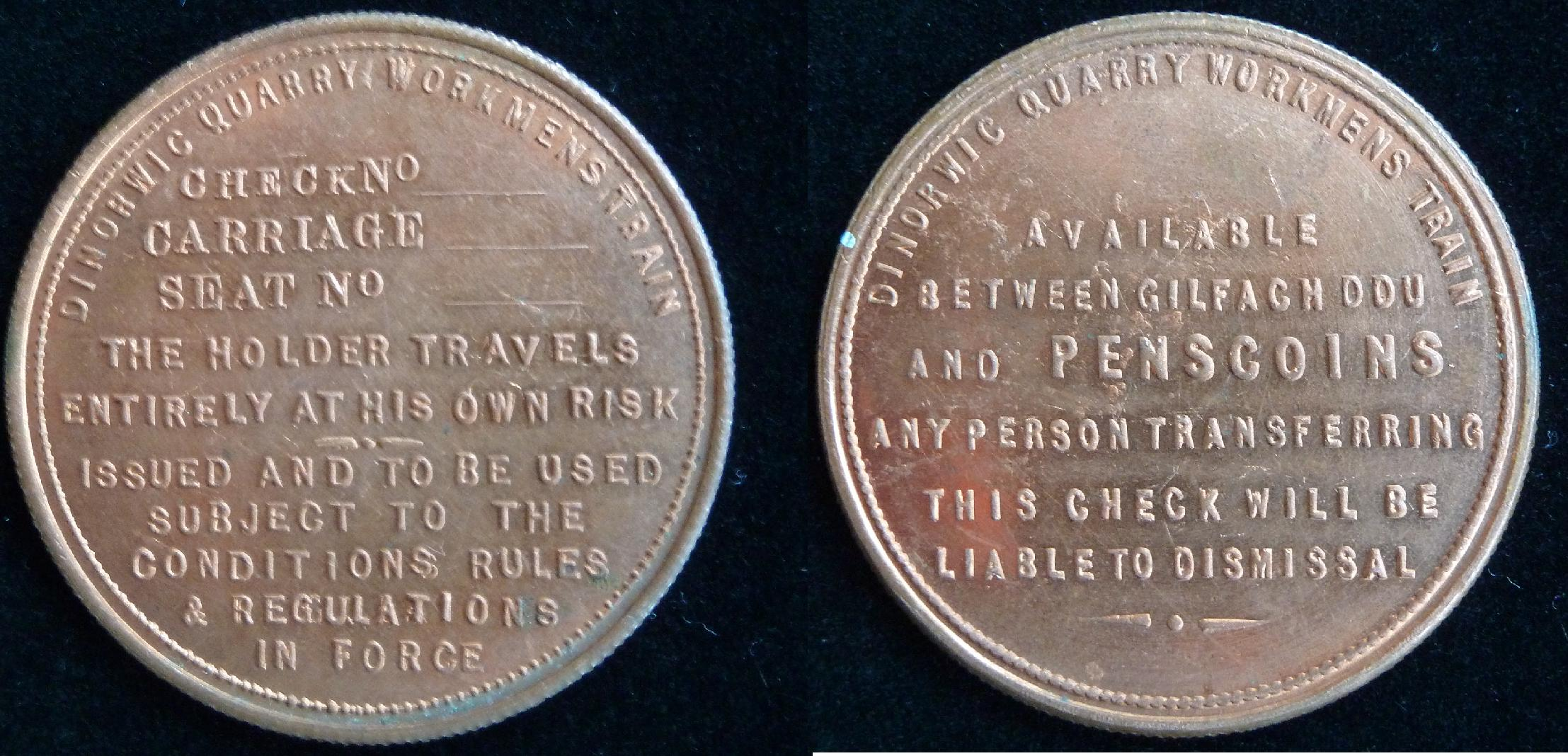
Penscoins token

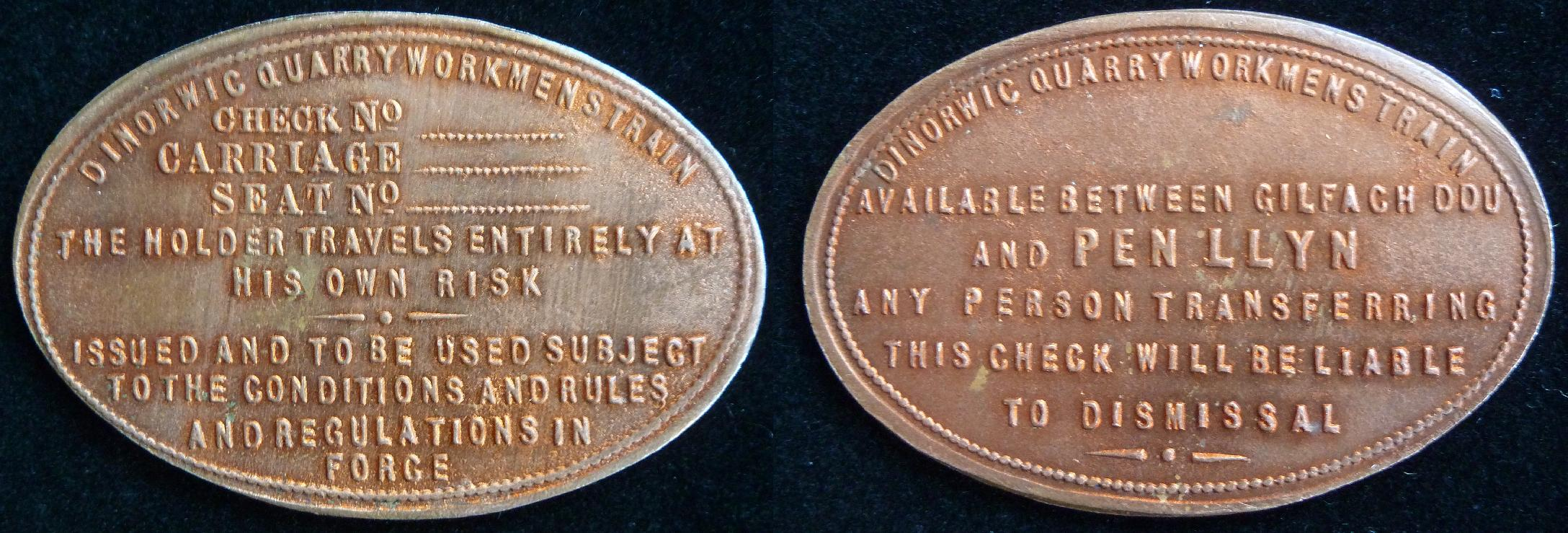
Penllyn oval

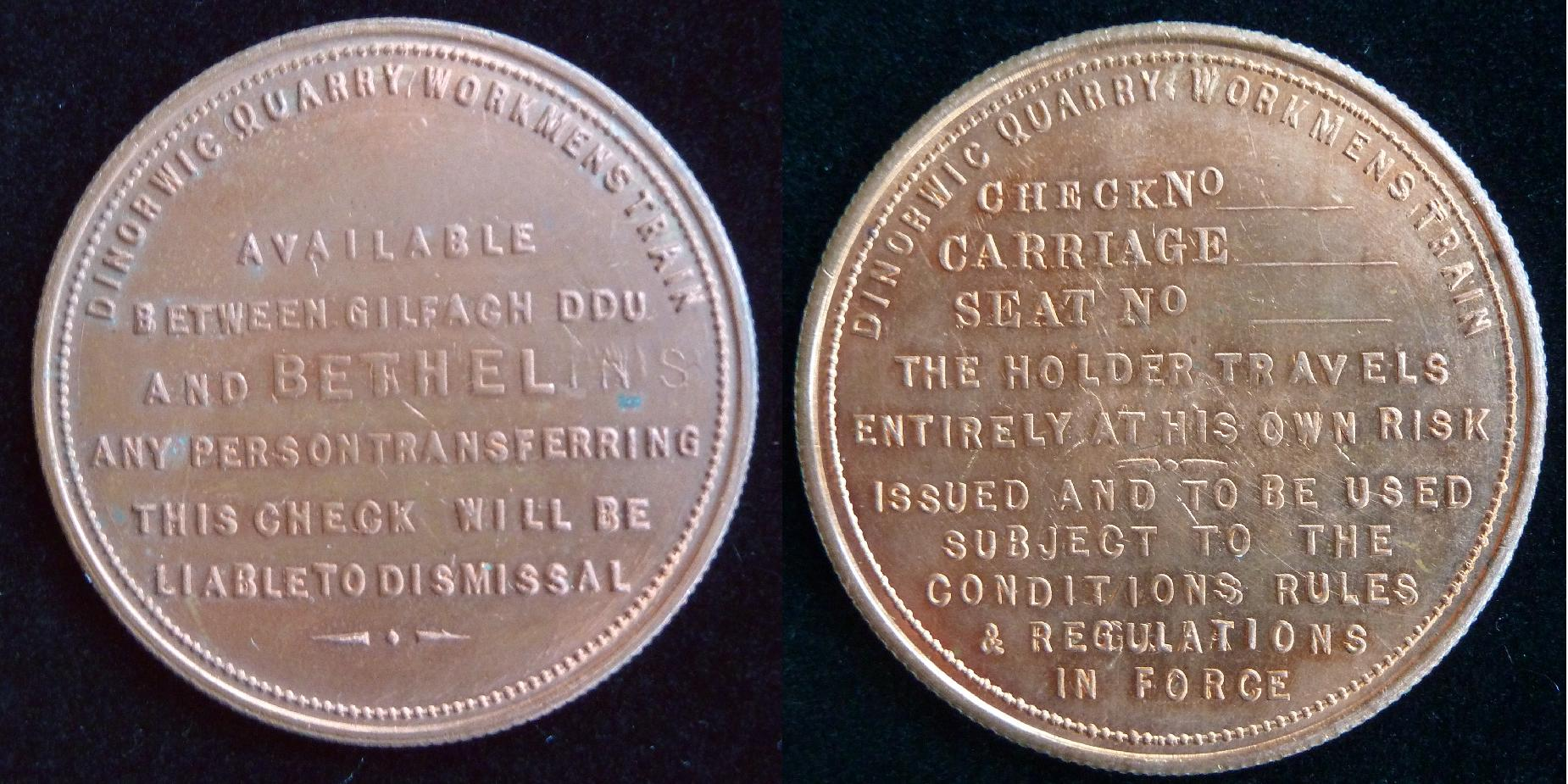
Bethel token

== Owner's saloons ==
The owner was "not a man to hide his light under a bushel". In 1845, he had a coach house built at Penscoins, and (by implication, as no mention is made in the company accounts) bought a saloon from his own pocket for use when he took guests from the port to the quarries. It was "a smaller version of the saloon [..] which survives today."

The "Saloon Shed" was rebuilt in 1888. Around the same time as the order for the workmen's carriages, the company also ordered a replacement private saloon for the owner and his guests. This had the same running gear and dimensions as the workmen's, but was relatively opulent inside, with, for example, eight padded revolving chairs instead of wooden benches.

Up to closure, the saloon was attached to a normal train on pay days and used to carry the workers' wages. The vehicle has survived into preservation at Penrhyn Castle.

== Locomotives ==
Name	Builder	Type	Date	Works number	Notes
Fire Queen	A. Horlock and Co	0-4-0 tender	1848		Withdrawn 1886, was preserved at the Penrhyn Castle Railway Museum at Penrhyn Castle
Jenny Lind	A. Horlock and Co	0-4-0 tender	1848		Withdrawn 1880s, scrapped.
Dinorwic	Hunslet	0-6-0T	1882	302	Scrapped 1963
Pandora	Hunslet	0-6-0T	1886	410	Renamed Amalthaea in 1909. Believed to be the only British locomotive with a ligature ("æ") cast in its nameplates. Scrapped 1963
Velinheli	Hunslet	0-6-0T	1895	631	Dismantled for major overhaul 1953, majority of parts scrapped 1963
Hardy	Hardy Motors Ltd.	4wPM	1925	954	Scrapped 1963

=== Velinheli ===
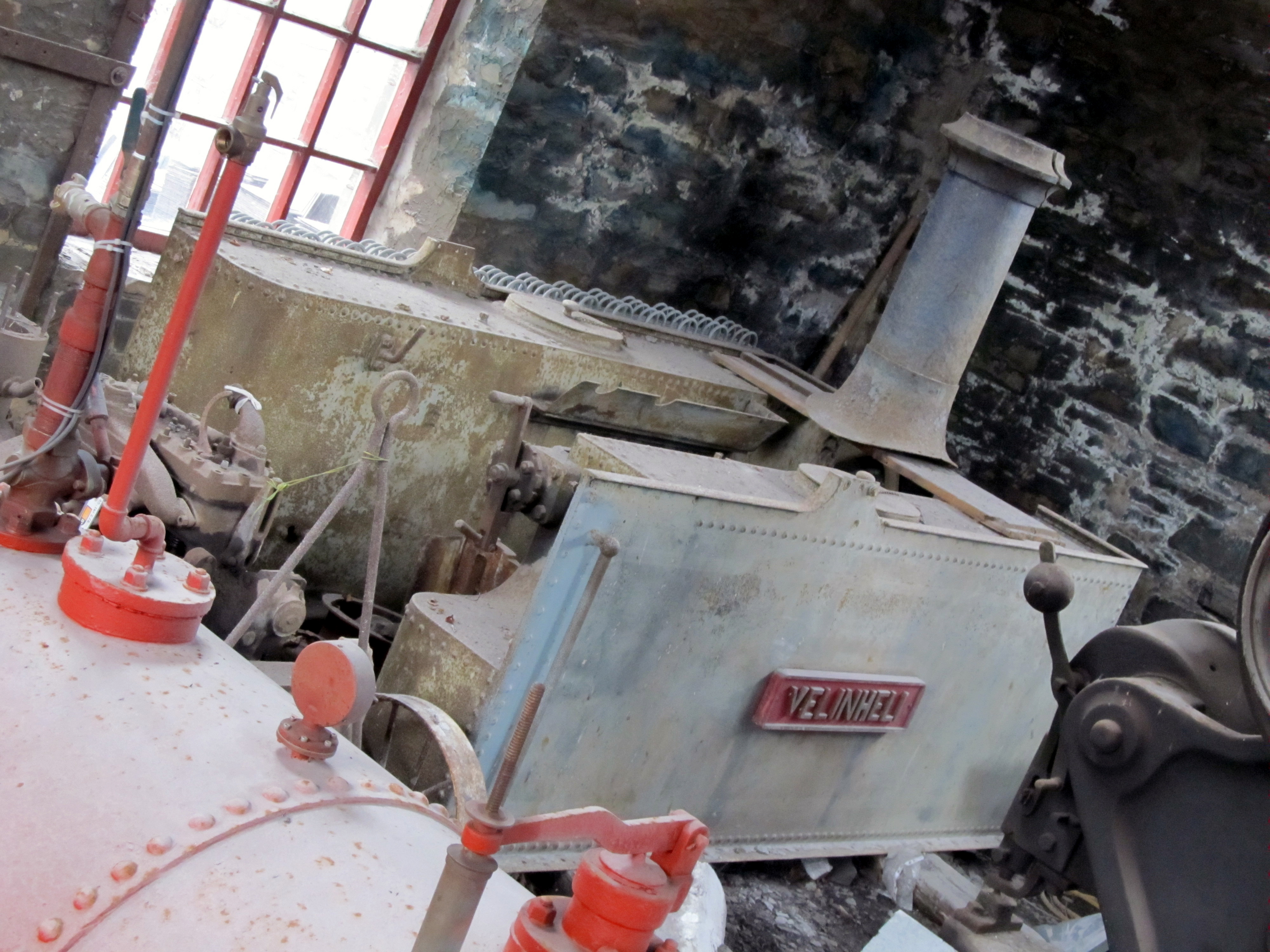
The side tanks and chimney belonging to Velinheli

In 1963, Velinheli was in pieces in the railway's workshops at Gilfach Ddu, having been out of traffic since 1953 for major overhaul that was never completed. Whilst the majority of this locomotive was scrapped, certain items survive and are now on display within the National Slate Museum at Gilfach Ddu. Preserved part include the side tanks (complete with nameplate Velinheli on one side only), chimney, sand boxes and ash-pan. The identity of all the remaining parts cannot be confirmed as belonging to Velinheli due to the swapping of locomotive parts, a common practice on the quarries' various railway systems.

== Llanberis Lake Railway ==
On 28 May 1971, the southern part of the route was reopened as the 1 ft 11 1/2 in (597 mm) narrow-gauge Llanberis Lake Railway.

== See also ==
- British narrow-gauge railways
- Port Dinorwic railway station
