= Penrhyn Castle Railway Museum =

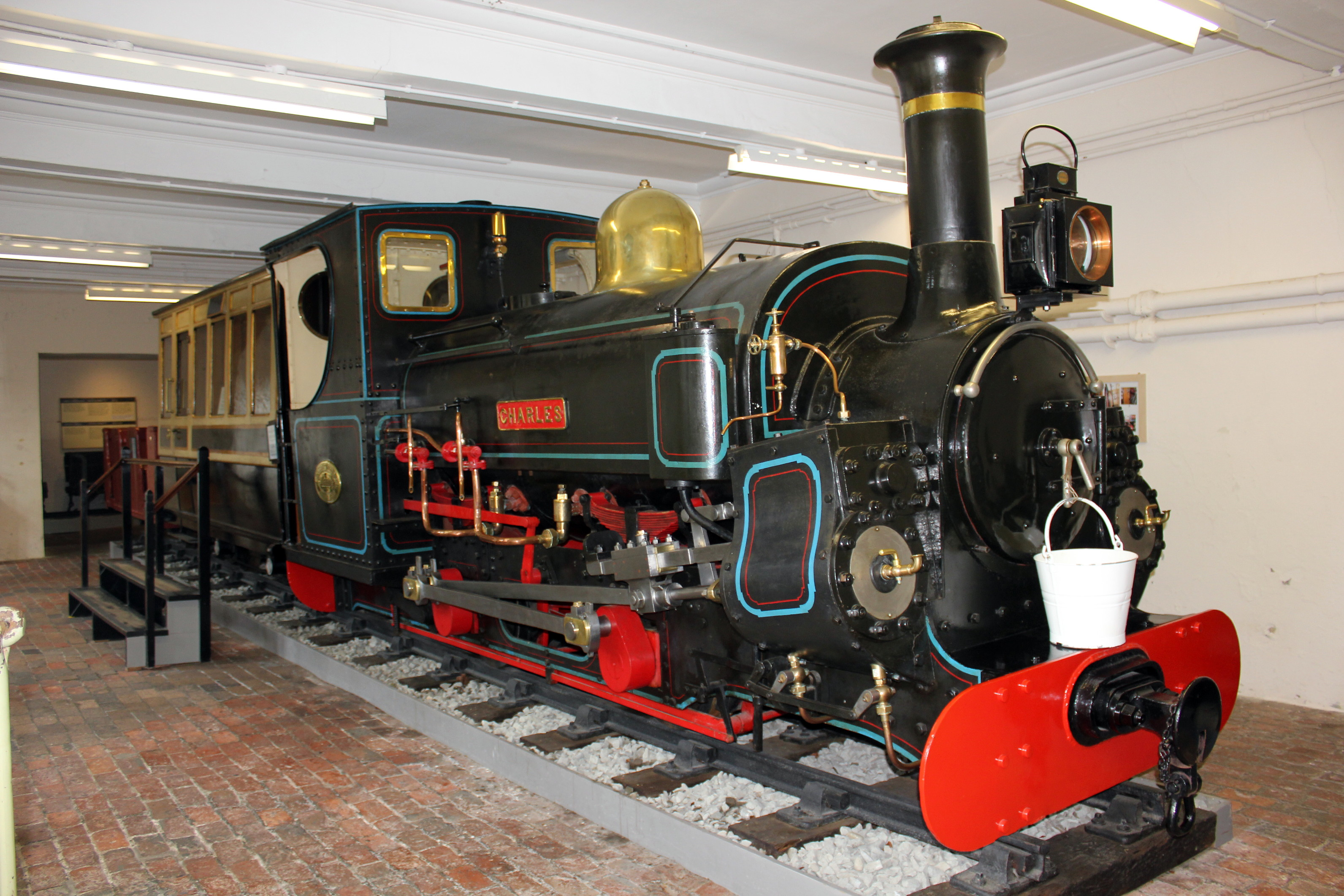
- Charles of the Penrhyn Quarry Railway

- Location within Gwynedd
- Established: 1951
- Location: Llandygai, Gwynedd, Wales
- Coordinates: 53.2264°N 4.0947°W
- Type: Railroad museum
- Owner: National Trust
- Website: Penrhyn Castle Railway Museum

The Penrhyn Castle Railway Museum (Welsh: Amgueddfa Rheilffordd Castell Penrhyn) was a museum of industrial railway equipment, located at Penrhyn Castle near Bangor in Wales.

In the nineteenth century, Penrhyn Castle was the home of the Pennant family (from 1840, the Douglas-Pennants), owners of the Penrhyn slate quarry at Bethesda. The quarry was closely associated with the development of industrial narrow-gauge railways, and in particular the Penrhyn Quarry Railway (PQR), one of the earliest industrial railways in the world. The PQR ran close to Penrhyn Castle, and when the castle was bequeathed to the National Trust in 1951 a small museum of industrial railway relics was created in the stable block.

The first locomotive donated to the museum was Charles, one of the three remaining steam locomotives working on the PQR. Over the years a number of other historically significant British narrow-gauge locomotives and other artifacts have been added to the collection.

In early 2024, the Trust announced the closure of the museum, with the majority of the locomotives to be relocated and the site redeveloped as a new "Industrial Penrhyn" experience.

== Locomotives ==
Name	Image	Gauge	Builder	Type	Date	Works number	Notes
Charles		1 ft 10 3/4 in (578 mm)	Hunslet	0-4-0ST	1882	283	Worked on the Penrhyn Quarry Railway. To be retained as part of the planned "Industrial Penrhyn" museum.
Hugh Napier		1 ft 10 3/4 in (578 mm)	Hunslet	0-4-0ST	1904	855	ex-Penrhyn Quarry locomotive, moved to the Ffestiniog Railway and restored to working order at Boston Lodge in 2012.
Fire Queen		4 ft (1,219 mm)	A. Horlock and Co	0-4-0 tender	1848		Worked on the Padarn Railway. Moved to the Vale of Rheidol Railway in 2024.
Watkin		3 ft (914 mm)	De Winton	0-4-0VBT	1893		ex-Penmaenmawr & Welsh Granite Co.
Kettering Furnaces No. 3		3 ft (914 mm)	Black, Hawthorn & Co	0-4-0ST	1885	859	Ex-Kettering Ironstone Railway. Donated to the Waterford and Suir Valley Railway in 2024.
No. 1		4 ft 8 1/2 in (1,435 mm) standard gauge	Neilson and Company	0-4-0	1870	1561	ex Beckton Gas Works railway. Moved to the Museum of Scottish Railways in early 2024.
Hawarden		4 ft 8 1/2 in (1,435 mm) standard gauge	Hudswell Clarke	0-4-0ST	1899	526	ex Globe Ironworks, Stalybridge Donated to the Middleton Railway in 2024 where it is now on display.
Vesta		4 ft 8 1/2 in (1,435 mm) standard gauge	Hudswell Clarke	0-6-0T	1916	1223	ex Hawarden Bridge steel works Donated to the East Lancashire Railway in 2024 and is now on display in the Bury Transport Museum.
Haydock		4 ft 8 1/2 in (1,435 mm) standard gauge	Robert Stephenson & Co	0-6-0T	1879	2309	Ex Haydock Collieries Railway. Moved to the Isle of Wight Steam Railway in 2024.

== See also ==
- British narrow-gauge railways
