= Dinorwic quarry =

Former slate quarry in north Wales

Dinorwic
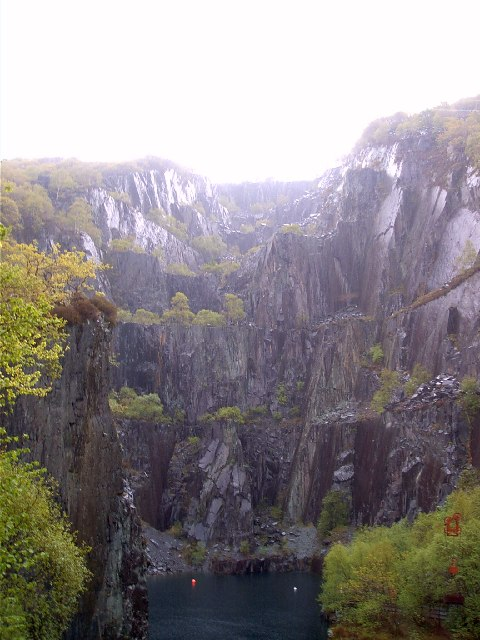
- Vivian quarry, part of the Dinorwic quarry

- Location in Gwynedd
- Location: Dinorwig, near Llanberis, Gwynedd (formerly Caernarfonshire), Wales; 53°07′34″N 4°05′53″W SH 59631 60860
- Products: Slate
- Type: Quarry
- Opened: 1787
- Closed: July 4, 1969

UNESCO World Heritage Site
- Part of: The Slate Landscape of Northwest Wales
- Criteria: Cultural: ii, iv
- Reference: 1633-002
- Inscription: 2021 (44th Session)

Dinorwic quarry (/dɪˈnɔːrwɪɡ/ din-OR-wig; Welsh: [dɪˈnɔrwɪɡ]; also known as Dinorwig quarry) is a large former slate quarry, now home to the Welsh National Slate Museum, located between the villages of Llanberis and Dinorwig (formerly Dinorwic) in Wales. At its height at the start of the 20th century, it was the second largest slate quarry in Wales (and thus, the world), after the neighbouring Penrhyn quarry near Bethesda. Dinorwic covered 700 acres (283 ha) consisting of two main quarry sections with 20 galleries in each. Extensive internal tramway systems connected the quarries using inclines to transport slate between galleries. Since its closure in 1969, the quarry has become the site of the National Slate Museum, a regular film location, hiking location, and an extreme rock climbing destination.

== History ==
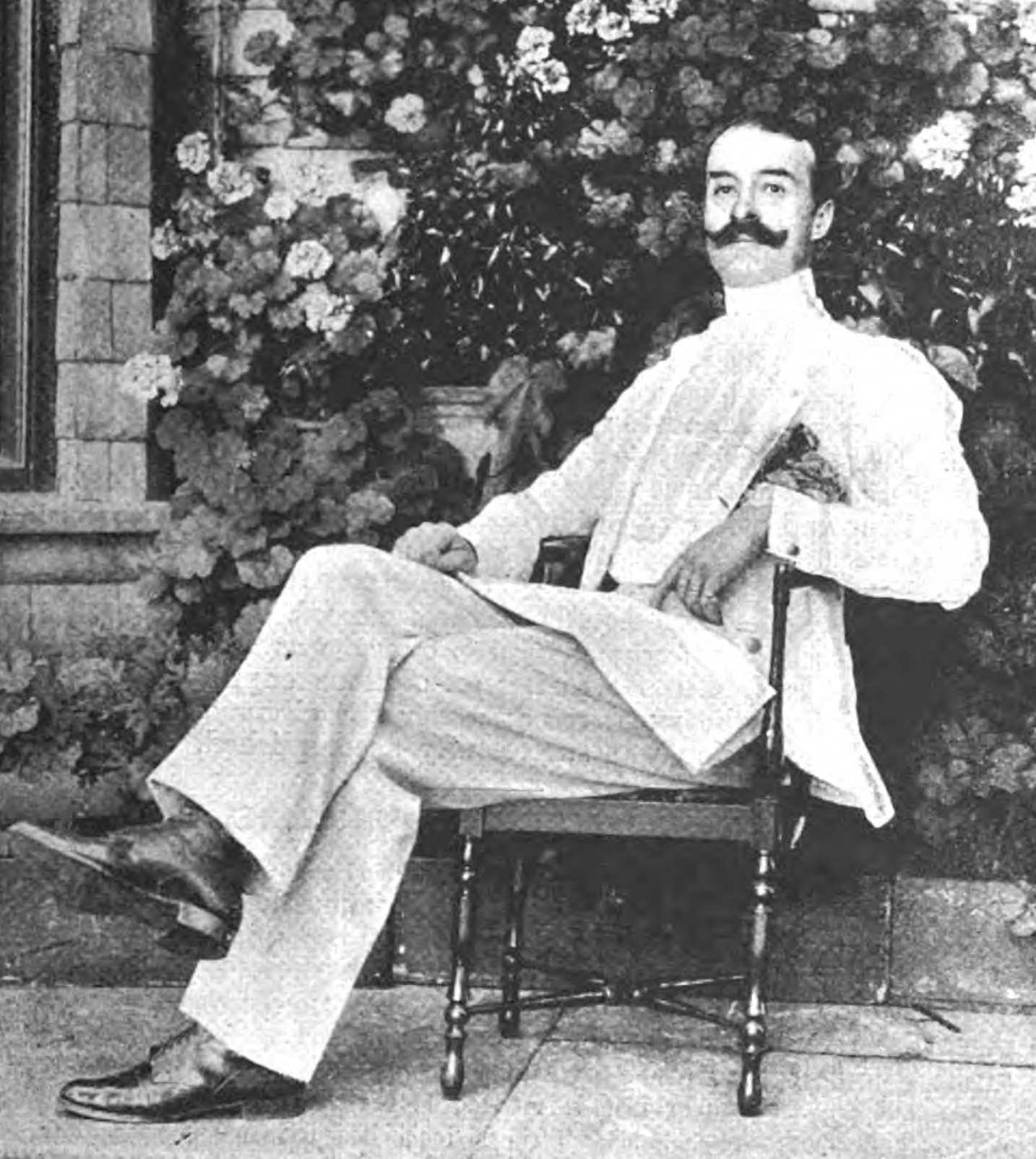
Walter Warwick Vivian, manager of Dinorwic, in 1896

The first commercial attempts at slate mining took place in 1787 when a private partnership obtained a lease from the landowner, Assheton Smith. Although this was met with moderate success, the outbreak of war with France, taxes, and transportation costs limited the development of the quarry. A new business partnership led by Assheton Smith was formed on the expiry of the lease in 1809 and the business boomed after the construction of a horse-drawn tramway to Port Dinorwic in 1824.

At its peak in the late 19th century, "when it was producing an annual outcome of 100,000 tonnes", Dinorwic employed more than 3,000 men and was the second-largest opencast slate producer in the country. Although by 1930 its working employment had dropped to 2,000, it continued in production until 1969.

=== Quarrying ===
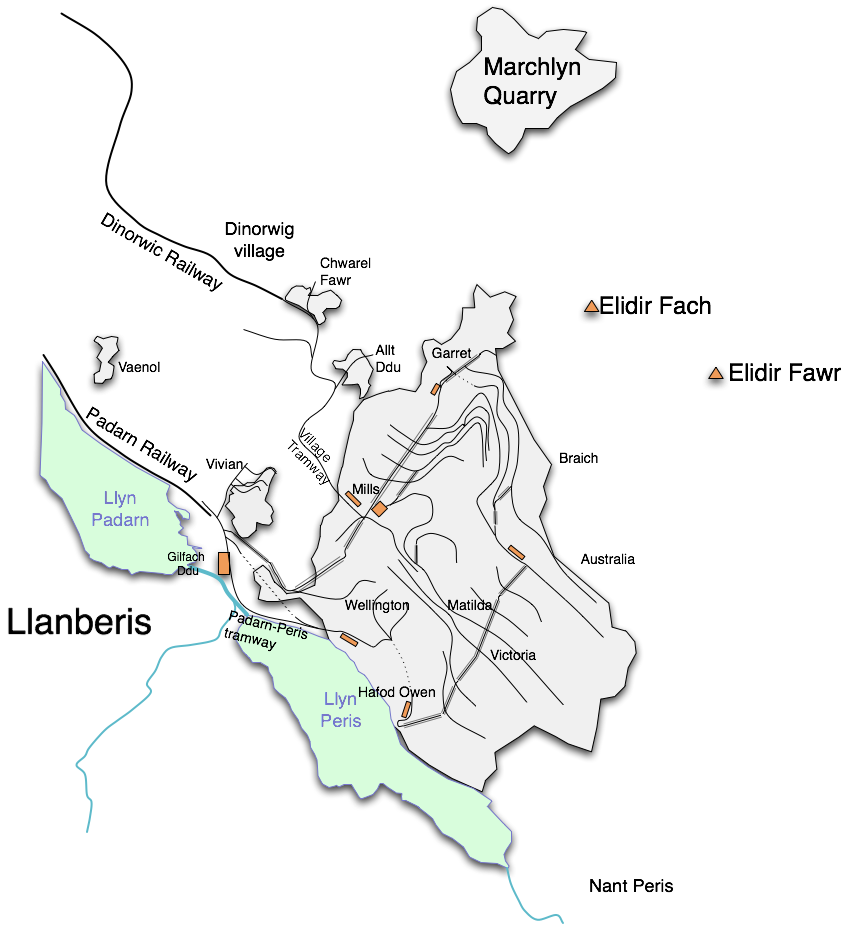
Dinorwic quarry, showing major inclines, mills, levels, and tramways, and the Padarn Railway and Dinorwic Railway

The slate vein at Dinorwic is nearly vertical and lies at or near the surface of the mountain, allowing it to be worked in a series of stepped galleries. This is however not quite how the quarry developed.

The first quarrying was spread across several sites: Adelaide, Allt Ddu, Braich, Bryn Glas, Bryn Llys, Chwarel Fawr, Ellis, Garrett, Harriet, Matilda, Morgan's, Raven Rock, Sofia, Turner, Victoria, and Wellington. This was a situation that lasted for many years, certainly until the mid-1830s.

The 1824 railway brought transport problems. Produce from the upper quarries was not a problem, but Wellington, Ellis, Turner, Harriet, and Victoria quarries were all below the level of the railway. This was a problem solved in the 1840s when the lake level railway was built, and the quarry as we know it began to take shape.

Adelaide quarry became a part of Allt Ddu, and Chwarel Fawr and Chwarel Goch became linked to it too. In the 'Great New Quarry', Raven Rock and Garret Quarries became one massive quarry, operating as an open hillside gallery quarry, with the lowest two levels being accessed by tunnels. Harriet, Morgans, and Sofia quarry are all still identifiable as separate pits today, whilst Braich quarry became a large working of three contiguous smaller pits. Below this, The galleries of Victoria and Wellington were joined along the hillside and continued downwards in two separate main workings: Wellington and Hafod Owen. Each was eventually to contain several small sinks too, some below lake level. The current form of the quarry is little different from that of the time of the Great War, save for enlarging of the actual quarry faces and deepening of the sinks. Certainly, all the main inclines were in place, very little was altered until closure.

The nearby Marchlyn quarry was opened in the 1930s to provide access to the main slate vein higher up the mountain.

=== Closure ===
The quarry closed in July 1969, the result of industrial decline and difficult slate removal. During the 1950s/60s extraction had become difficult, because after 170 years of extraction many of the unsystematically dumped tips were beginning to slide into some of the major pit workings, and after an enormous fall in the Garret area of the quarry in 1966, production had ceased almost permanently. It was however decided that some final work could be done by clearing some of the waste from the Garret fall. This involved making an access road for more modern quarry vehicles across some of the terraces, to the rockfall. This amount of slate won by this method was small and all production stopped by 1969.

At the Receiver's instruction a public auction was arranged, intended to pay off some of the quarry's debts. The auctions were held on 12 and 13 December 1969. The auctioneer's national advertisement (in The Guardian 29 November 1969), the event was described as "An auction sale of machine tools and stocks, four Hunslet locos, and engine and boat fittings". The locomotives referred to, lots 613–616, were "Dolbadarn", "Red Damsel", "Wild Aster" and "Irish Mail". Before the bidding started, it was announced that Gwynedd County Council had placed a Preservation Order on the Gilfach Ddu workshops, and many items within it.

== Transport ==
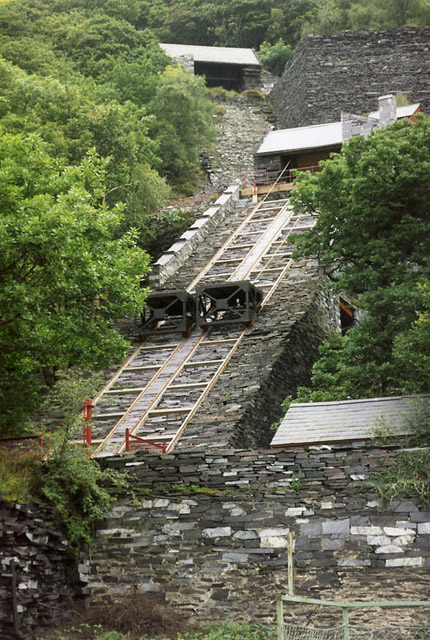
The Vivian transporter incline, completed in 1873, and restored in 1998. The transporters run on 5 ft 6 in (1,676 mm) gauge tracks.

The original connection between the quarry and the company's port at Y Felinheli was the Dinorwic Railway, a 2 ft (610 mm) gauge line built in 1824. This was worked by horses and it soon became apparent that it was inadequate for the traffic generated by the quarry. A number of surveys of alternative routes were undertaken by members of the Spooner family, the result of which was the construction of a new railway which opened in 1848: the 4 ft (1,219 mm) gauge Padarn Railway which operated as the quarry's main transport link until closure in 1961.

=== Tramways ===
The first use of railways at the quarry came around 1800 when the first internal tramways were in use. These first lines were worked using horse- and hand- power. For the next seventy years, the tramway system grew until it reached the point where more powerful traction was required. The first steam locomotives used were small vertical boiler locos supplied by De Winton's of Caernarfon. In 1870 the first locomotive supplied by the Hunslet Engine Company arrived at the quarry, and the majority of the locomotives that worked at Dinorwic were eventually supplied by Hunslet.

Between 1935 and 1949 the Quarry acquired 22 light internal combustion rail tractors for use on the levels. Half of these were new, the other half second-hand. Their survival rate did not match those of the steam locomotives, and when the quarry closed in 1969 only three still survived.

Although a nominal two-foot gauge, the actual gauge between the rails at Dinorwic was 1 ft 10 3/4 in (578 mm) in common with its neighbour Penrhyn, but fractionally narrower than the public lines of the Ffestiniog Railway or North Wales Narrow Gauge Railway which were 1 ft 11 1/2 in (597 mm).

=== Locomotives ===
Early steam locomotives were used by the quarry, and built by De Winton & Co. But from 1870 the quarry acquired most of its locomotives new from the Hunslet Engine Company of Leeds. These were purpose-built, initially using a series of Hunslet general/unclassified designs, but after 1886 these fell into one of three classes:

- Alice
- Port: larger and designed primarily to work at Port Dinorwic, although Michael never did.
- Tram or Mills: worked on marshaling duties on the Padarn–Peris Tram Line, which linked the quarry mills to the Padarn Railway for transportation to Port Dinorwic.

Orig. name / number	Later name	Image	Builder	Year acquired	Year sold	Notes
Wellington			De Winton	c1870	1898	
Harriet			De Winton	1874	pre 1895	
Peris			De Winton	1875	pre 1895	
Victoria			De Winton	1876	pre 1895	
Padarn			De Winton	c1898	?	
Dinorwic	Charlie		Hunslet	1870	by 1919	
George	Minstrel Park		Hunslet	1877	by 1919	
Louisa			Hunslet	1877	by 1989	
Sybil			W. G. Bagnall	1906	?	Restoration project taking place at the West Lancashire Light Railway
No.70			Barclay & Sons	1931	1962	
Elidir			Avonside Engine	1933	1966	
Velinheli			Hunslet	1886	1965	Alice class Now preserved at the Launceston Steam Railway. Currently on loan to the Ffestiniog Railway.
Alice	King of the Scarlets		Hunslet	1889	1965	Alice class Preserved at the Statfold Barn Railway
Enid	Red Damsel later Elidir		Hunslet	1889	1969	Alice class
No.1	Rough Pup		Hunslet	1891	1968	Alice class Preserved at the NGM
No.2	Cloister		Hunslet	1892	1962	Alice class Preserved at the Statfold Barn Railway
The First	Bernstein		Hunslet	1892	1967	Alice class
The Second	Covertcoat		Hunslet	1898	1964	Alice class
Wellington	George B.		Hunslet	1898	1965	Alice class Now at the Bala Lake Railway
No.3	Holy War		Hunslet	1902	1968	Alice class
No.4	Alice		Hunslet	1902	1972	Alice class
No.5	Maid Marian (briefly Covertcoat)		Hunslet	1903	1966	Alice class
No.6	Irish Mail		Hunslet	1903	1969	Alice class Preserved at West Lancashire Light Railway
No.7	Wild Aster now Thomas Bach		Hunslet	1904	1969	Alice class Now running on the Llanberis Lake Railway
No.1	Lady Joan		Hunslet	1922	1967	Port class Preserved at Bredgar and Wormshill Light Railway
No.2	Dolbadarn		Hunslet	1922	1969	Port class
Michael			Hunslet	1932	1965	Port class Preserved at the Statford Barn Railway
Vaenol	Jerry M		Hunslet	1895	1967	Tram/Mills class Now at the Hollycombe Steam Collection
Port Dinorwic	Cackler		Hunslet	1898	1966	Tram/Mills class

== Port Dinorwic ==
Port Dinorwic (Y Felinheli) was initially only a tidal creek on the Menai Strait's mainland shore called Aber-Pwll, Moel-y-Don, or Felin Heli. The Assheton-Smith family of Vaynol established a tiny wharf on a marshy inlet to convey the output of its Dinorwic quarry in 1793, which marked the beginning of the development of the dock system and related buildings. It was located directly downstream of a tide-powered grain mill that gave the region its Welsh name, Y Felinheli, and replaced an earlier setup where slate was lightered into the Menai Straits from 500 metres to the southwest. Slates from Dinorwic quarries were hoisted onto lighters and transported to ships anchored further offshore in the Menai Strait until the quays were opened in 1809 allowing ships to be loaded directly. The name Port Dinorwic was being used by 1824, and in this year a tramroad from Dinorwic quarries (the Dinorwic Railway) was opened.

In 1848, a steam-operated railway on a new track replaced the tramroad and operated until 1961. The Padarn Railway, or the Dinorwic Quarries Railway as it was also known, belonged to the quarry company. It was constructed with a four-foot gauge but transported slate waggons with a nominal two-foot (centre-to-centre) gauge from the Gilfach-ddu quarry yard to Penscoins at the top of the escarpment with a view of Port Dinorwic. From the transporters, they were unloaded here and lowered down a self-acting incline to the port, where locomotives moved them to the quays. Despite the fact that these locos were close to but not identical to those employed in the quarry, they were occasionally moved between places. The buffer beams on the port locos caused particular difficulties when trying to get them up the inclines to the higher levels of the quarry, but it was achieved.

Docks and quays were constructed in 1809, lock gates were added in 1828, dry docks and engineering facilities were built in the 1830s, a new outer basin was finished in 1854, an outer lock was added in 1897, and a new sea wall was built in 1905 between the harbour and basin to extend the quays. In 1852, a standard gauge extension of the Chester and Holyhead Railway reached Port Dinorwic, although nearly 90% of the slate continued to be transported by sea, exclusively in rented vessels. The dry dock was a unique facility in North Wales, making it very valuable to coastal shipping while the vessels were there. The engineering shops of The Dry Dock Co. also were looking to have Merddin Emrys's boiler repaired with new copper fireboxes and retubing the FR Co. got estimates from Avonside Engine Company of Bristol and the Quarry Engineering Works at Port Dinorwic. The boiler was eventually sent to Bristol to get the work done.

In 1892, the first steamship owned by a quarry was purchased. Port Dinorwic was never the fully developed maritime community of the nineteenth century that Porthmadog was, in part because it shared ownership with the Quarry and was devoted to its commerce. For instance, it lacked a sizable shipbuilding sector, and the surveyor for ship insurance in Port Dinorwic worked for the Portmadoc Mutual Ship Insurance Society. The organisation has no less than thirteen surveyors working in Porthmadog! Other visiting steamers that were not owned by the quarry were nevertheless crucial after the First World War. The ships owned by Dinorwic Quarry were underrepresented in a 1925 photograph of coastal steamers.

== Post-closure ==
=== National Slate Museum ===
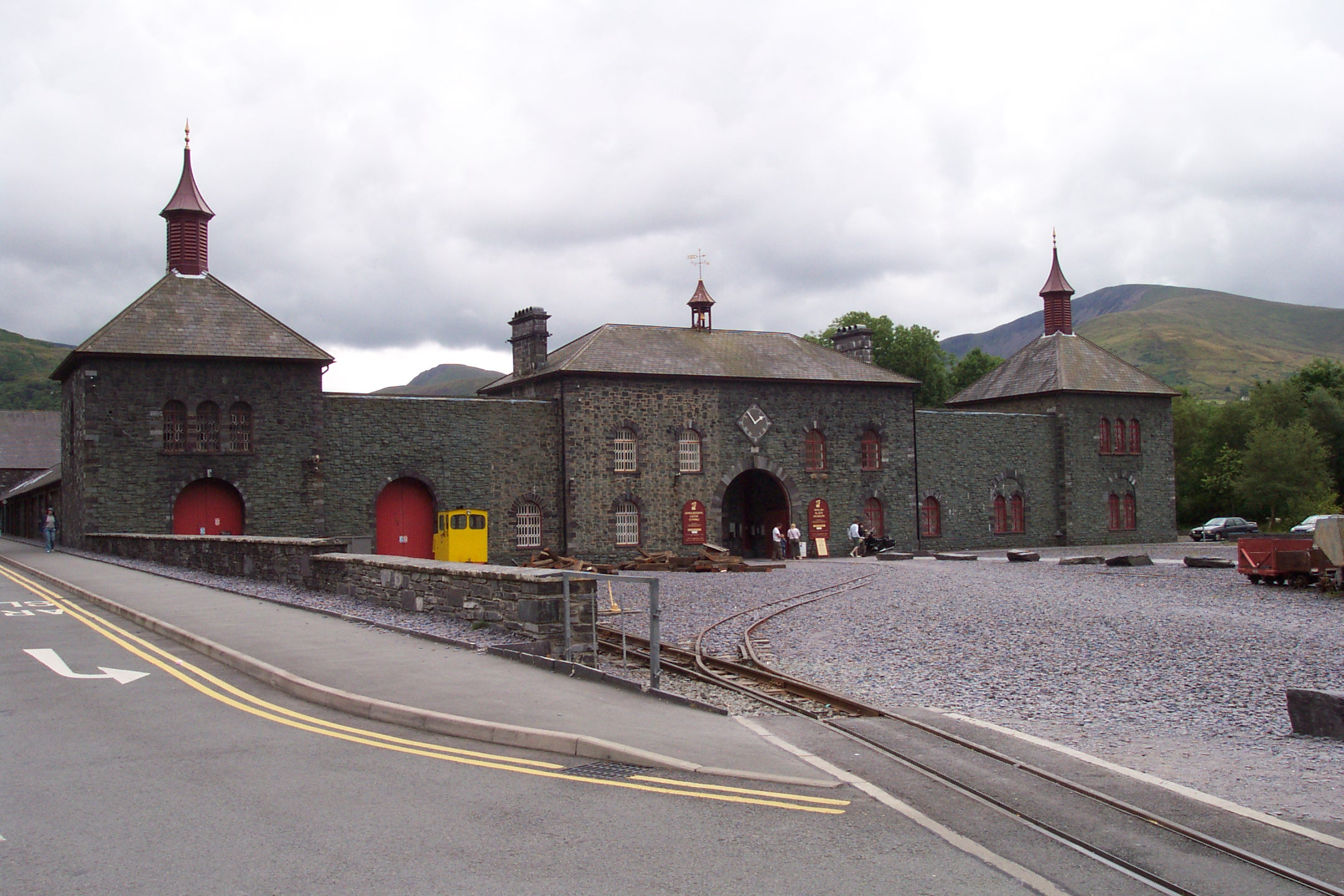
Welsh Slate Museum located in Gilfach Ddu

Following closure, the quarry's workshop at Gilfach Ddu was acquired by the then Caernarfonshire County Council, who now lease the building to the National Museum and Galleries of Wales. It now houses the National Slate Museum. Equipment from the internal quarry railway was used to build the Llanberis Lake Railway over part of the trackbed of the Padarn Railway. The quarry has been partly used by the Dinorwig power station, a pumped storage hydroelectric scheme. Many of the Hunslet locomotives have been preserved on several of Britain's narrow gauge heritage railways. More recently, new build versions of the class have been built by the Exmoor Steam Railway, and by a new Hunslet company at the Statfold Barn Railway.

=== Film location ===
In 1987, part of the film Willow was shot in the Dinorwic quarry, on the lower terraces next to the pumped-storage scheme. Scenes from the 1994 film Street Fighter were filmed on the south side of "Watford Gap" near the Matilda hole. Clash of the Titans was filmed in the quarry in 2009. English art-rock band Everything Everything filmed the music video for their song “Cold Reactor” at the quarry in 2023. It has also been used as a filming location for House of the Dragon.

=== Rock climbing ===
Rock climbing in the Dinorwic quarry

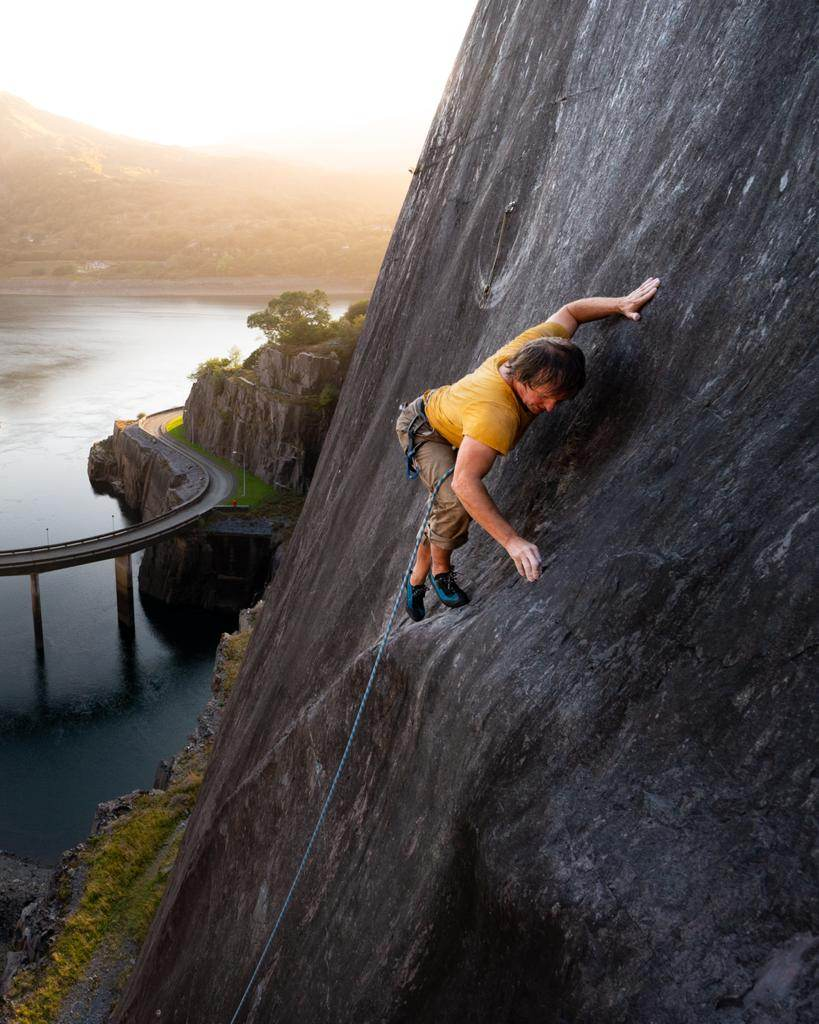
Johnny Dawes on Poetry Pink (E5 6b), Rainbow Slab

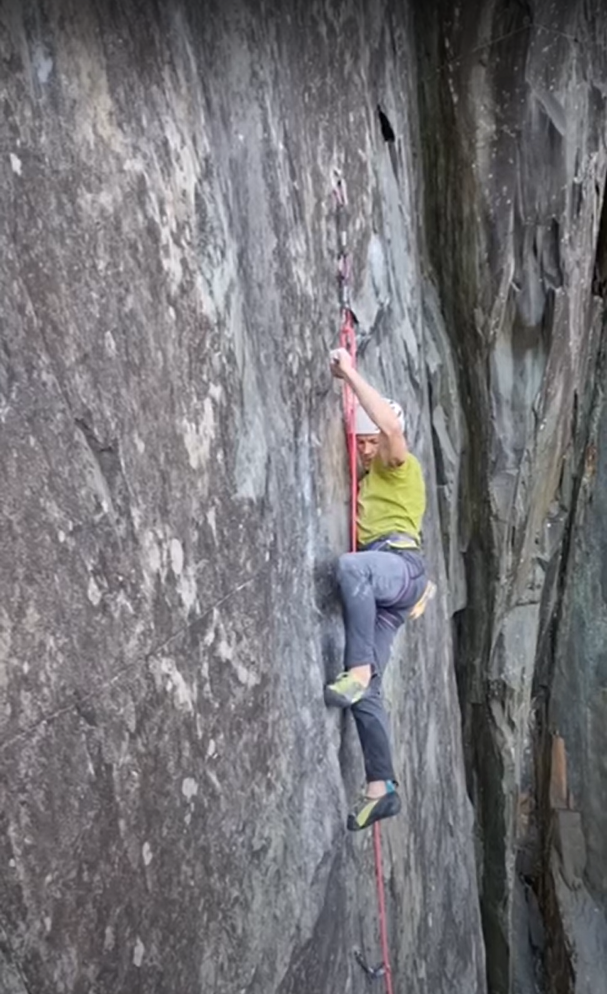
Angus Killie on The Meltdown (9a), Twll Mawr

The Dinorwic quarry has also become a major British rock climbing venue, particularly the sections of Twll Mawr (meaning "big hole"), Vivian quarry, Rainbow Slab, and Australia. Famous British rock climbers such as Johnny Dawes have created well-known extreme test-pieces such as the traditional climbing route The Quarryman (E8 7a) in the Twll Mawr section, and the sport climbing route The Very Big & the Very Small 8b+ (5.14a) in the Rainbow Slab section, of the Dinorwic quarry. The most famous route is Stevie Haston's Comes the Dervish (E3 5c) in the Vivian quarry section, and the hardest route is currently James McHaffie's sport climbing route, The Meltdown at 9a (5.14d) (previously bolted and attempted by Dawes and Jerry Moffatt), also in the Twll Mawr section. Climbing in the Vivian quarry has been prohibited by its owners following significant and frequent rockfalls in 2020, 2022, and after.

=== Scuba diving ===
The Vivian quarry section was also used for diving, with good visibility and depths ranging from 6–18 metres (20–59 ft), a platform at 6 metres (20 ft), plus flooded buildings, boats, a van and a gnome garden. The leaseholder, Scuba Scape, had planned to re-open with new diving activities in summer of 2025.

=== Hiking ===
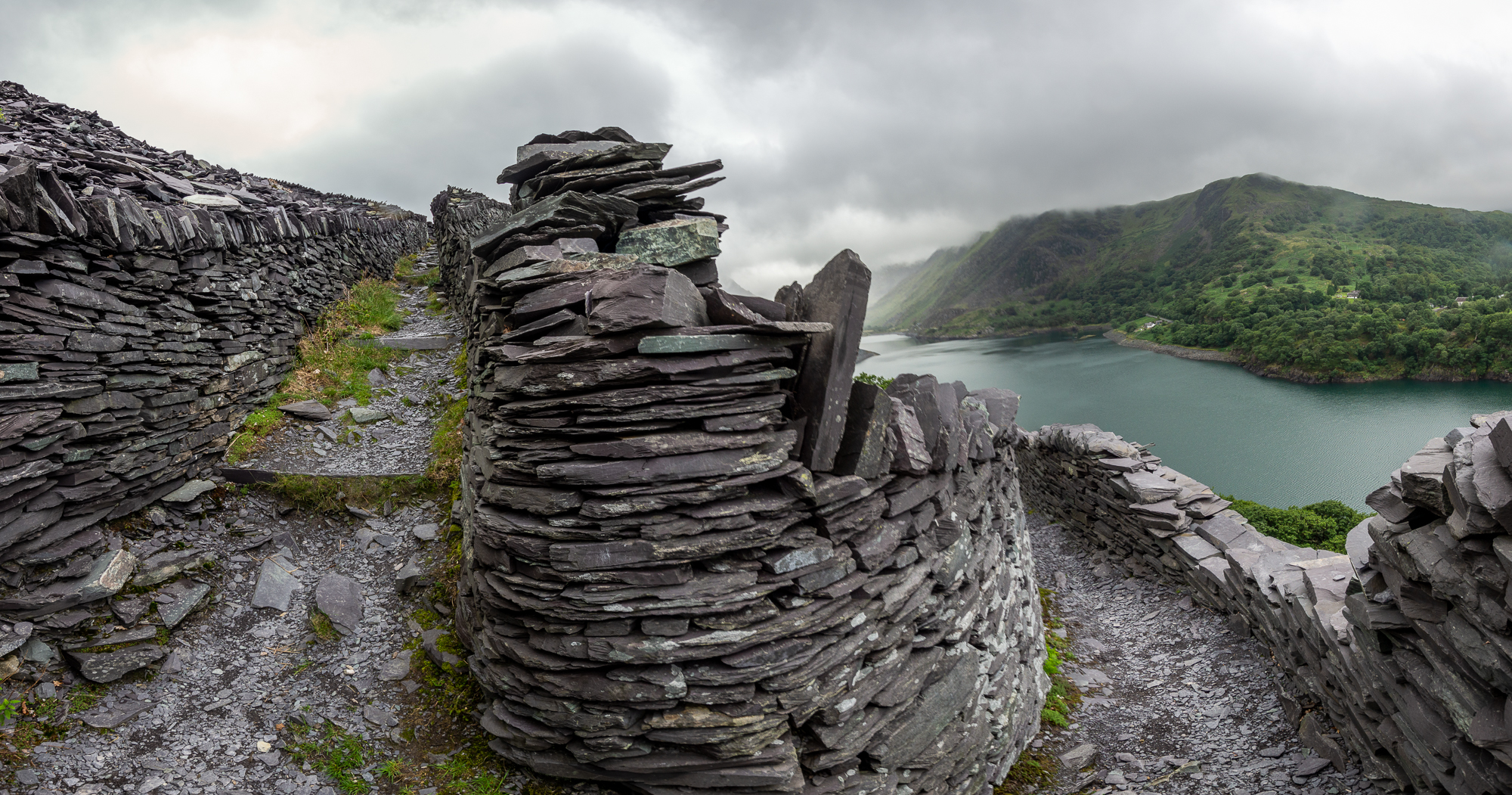
Zig zag path leading up to Dinorwic Quarry

A well-maintained hiking path with stairs and a zig zag trail leads into the quarry site from the National Slate Museum carpark. In 2020 foot access to Vivian quarry (only one part of the site) was closed for visitors due to several rockfalls in the area. Further rockfall in 2022 permanently closed off all remaining routes into the Vivian quarry. In spring of 2025 a surge of visitors brought by TikTok viral videos "overwhelmed" the site, and CCTV was installed to deter trespassing, with some visitors requiring rescue after trespassing off trail. In June of 2025 there was an additional rockfall in one of the prohibited areas.
