= Dinorwic Railway =

Railway line in UK

Overview
- Headquarters: Llanberis
- Locale: North Wales
- Dates of operation: 1824–May 1843
- Successor: Padarn Railway

Technical
- Track gauge: 2 ft (610 mm)
- Length: 8.25 miles (13.28 km)

The Dinorwic Railway was an early 2 ft (610 mm) narrow gauge industrial railway connecting the slate quarry at Dinorwic in Caernarvonshire with the coastal port at Y Felinheli. The line is sometimes referred to as the Dinorwic Tramroad or the Dinorwic Tramway.

== History ==
The Dinorwic slate quarry was purchased in 1809 by a group of investors led by Thomas Assheton-Smith and a significant expansion was started. Better transportation to the coast was required to handle the new production levels. Until 1812 slate for sale beyond the locality was sent by packhorse ("hampers on horseback") then sometimes by boat across Llyn Padarn then by cart to Caernarfon to be forwarded by sea. This slow, labour-intensive process could cost more and take longer for the seven miles from quarry to shore than from Caernarfon to Liverpool. In that year a trackway known as the "Slate Road" for horse-hauled sleds was opened leading without interruption from the quarry to the creek at Y Felinheli on the Menai Strait, sometimes known then as Aber Pwll and sometimes, confusingly, as Moel y Don because it was the mainland embarkation point for the Moel y Don ferry to the hamlet of Moel y Don on Anglesey. At this stage slate was sent from shore to ship using lighters.

Also in 1812, railways and inclines were introduced within the quarry.

By 1823, plans were being made to construct a railway from the quarry to the port, and construction began in June 1824, though Boyd gives the opening as "by 1824". By 1825 quarry records show slate shipments being made by rail.

The new railway followed the general route of the Slate Road from the highlands of The Braich northwest to near the coast, where it swung west to approach the creek on its northern side. All traffic was horse-drawn, with stables at Allt-Ddu, at the foot of the Craig Llwyd incline, at "Stablau Newydd" where the line came near the Slate Road and at the head of the Garth Incline. Port horses and manpower were used at the port itself. Between inclines the route was either level or favoured loads, though it was never "gravity worked". The inclines were "balanced" and "self-acting", i.e. the extra weight of a descending rake of loaded wagons lifted a corresponding rake of empties, with the rope, cable or chain passing round a braked drum to enable staff to maintain control.

Although the railway was a significant improvement on what went before, it had a number of limitations. It passed over land that was not owned by the quarry, so rent had to be paid to the landowners. It used three inclines along its route as it descended; working these slowed traffic and required extra manpower. More difficult still was that most quarry workings were below the level of the line's upper, southern reaches, and even, in some cases, below the line itself. By the early 1840s it was clear that as quarry production expanded further a newer, more efficient railway was needed. In 1841 work began on the replacement Padarn Railway, which opened on 3 March 1843.

The Dinorwic Railway ceased operations in May 1843 and had been "wholly removed" by 1850.
