= School of Psychology and Sport Science, Bangor University =

Coordinates: 53.228418°N 4.131108°W

School of Psychology and Sport Science
- Ysgol Seicoleg a Gwyddor Chwaraeon
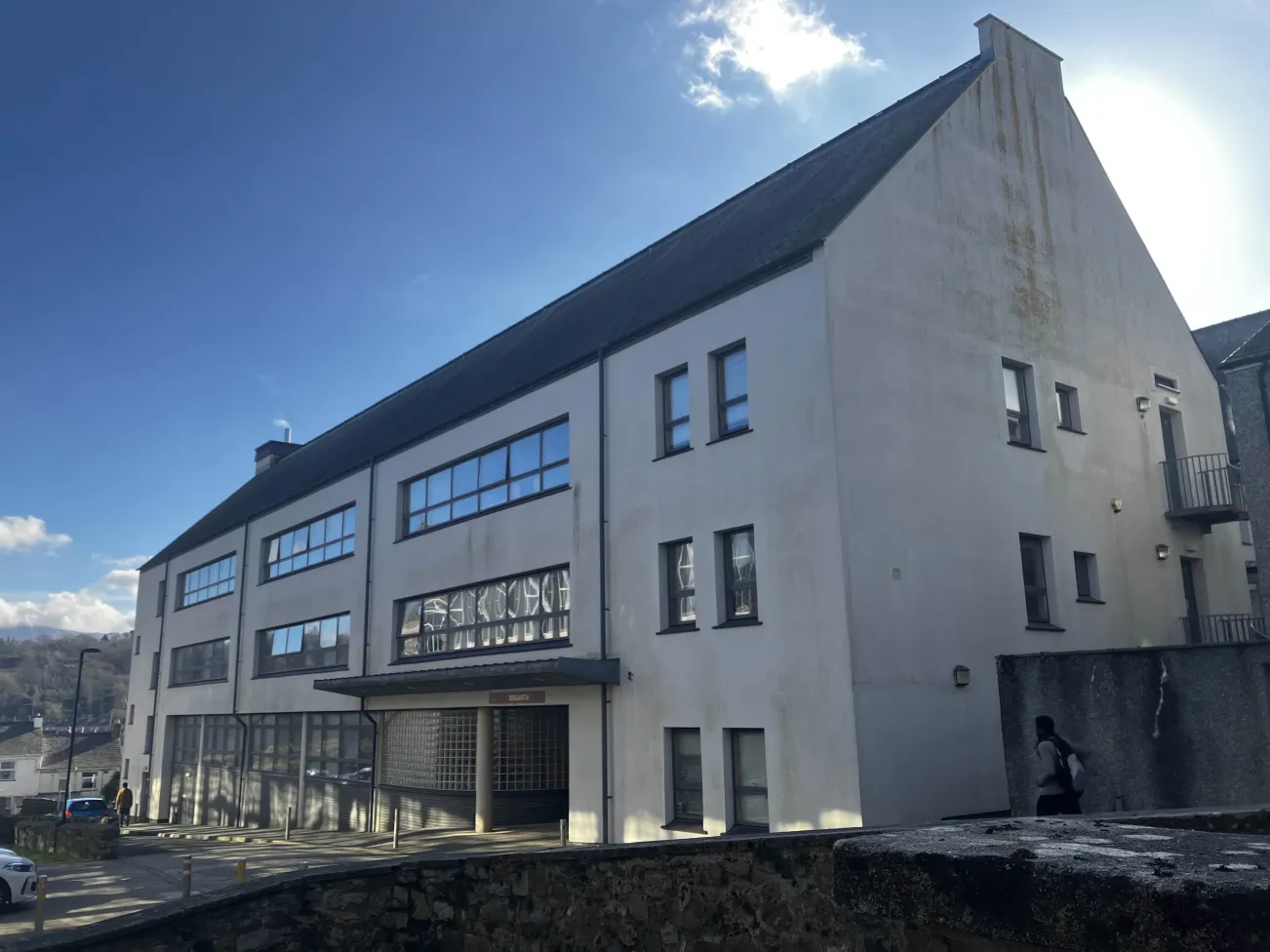
- Parent institution: College of Medicine and Health, Bangor University
- Head of School: Professor Dave Richardson
- Location: Bangor, Gwynedd, Wales
- Campus: Urban
- Website: bangor.ac.uk/spss

The School of Psychology and Sport Science is the school of psychology, clinical psychology, and sports science at Bangor University and is one of the largest psychology departments of any university in the United Kingdom. The school forms a large part of the College of Medicine and Health. In the latest Research Assessment Exercise, the School's Ph.D. program placed 9th overall within the UK.

The PsyPag Annual Conference of 2011 was held at Bangor University, hosted by the School.

== Research centres ==
- Bangor Imaging Unit
- Behavioural Analysis
- Centre for Mental Health
- Centre for Research on Bilingualism
- Clinical Programme
- Dementia Services
- Miles Dyslexia Centre
- Experimental Consumer Psychology
- Food and Activity Research Unit
- Incredible Years
- Tir Na n-Og Nursery
- Wales Institute of Cognitive Neuroscience
- Wolfson Centre for Clinical and Cognitive Neuroscience
- Centre for Mindfulness Research and Practice

== Brigantia ==
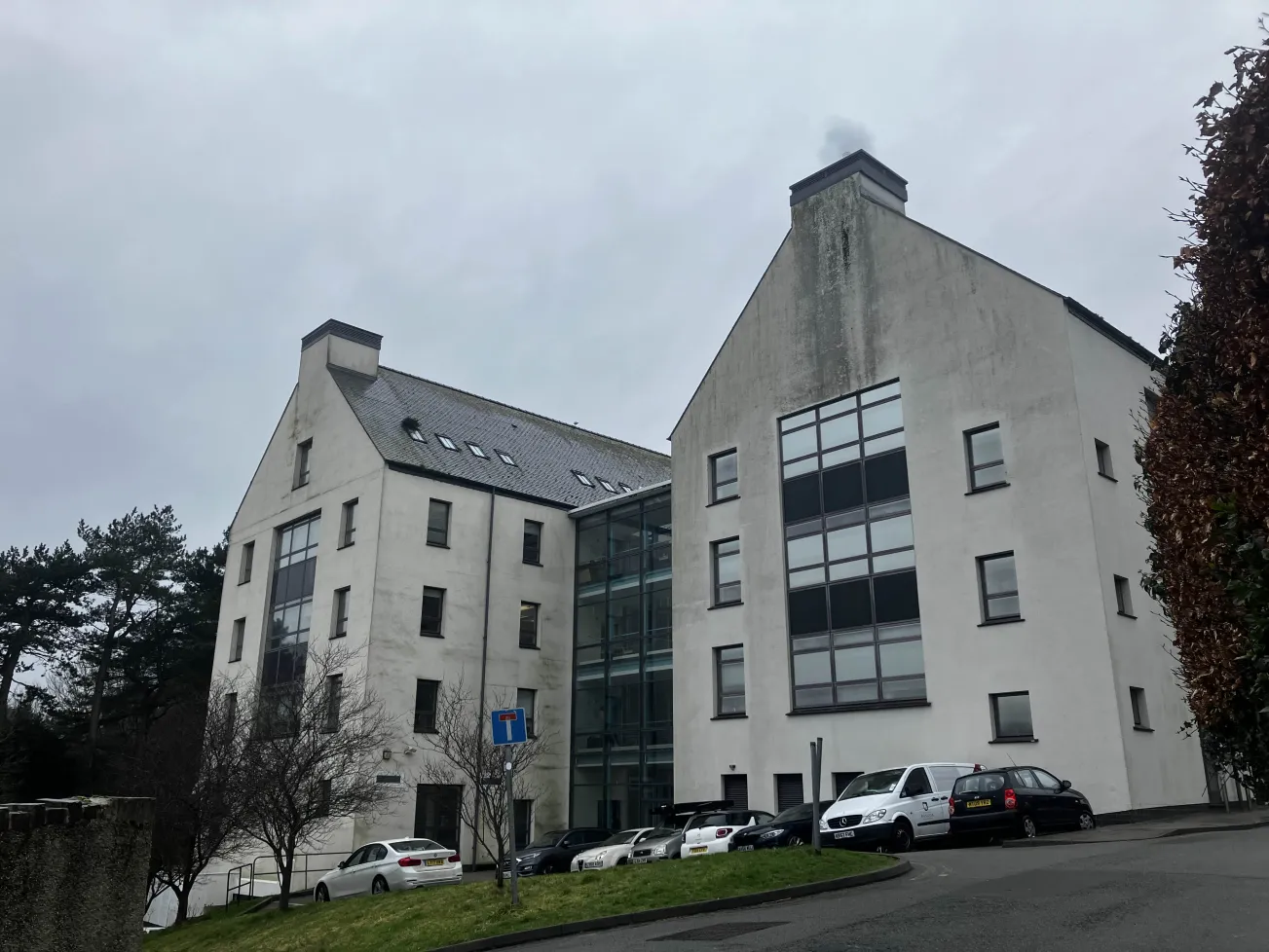
The southeastern side of the building

Brigantia, formerly known as the Psychology Building, is now the location of both the North Wales Medical School and the School of Psychology and Sport Science. It is located next to the central Main Arts building. Construction of the building began in 1998, completing two years later.

In 2019, amid a retrenchment review by the university, it was considered that the School of Health Sciences would move to the building as others would close.

The building is built in a contemporary style, whilst still similar to the Pritchard-Jones hall of the neighbouring Main Arts.
