= Bangor University =

Public research university in Bangor, Wales

- Welsh: Prifysgol Bangor
- Arms (official) Flag
- Other name: Welsh: Y Coleg ar y Bryn ("The College on the Hill")
- Former names: University College of North Wales (1884–1996); University of Wales, Bangor (1996–2007)
- Motto: Welsh: Gorau Dawn Deall
- Motto in English: "The Best Gift is Knowledge"
- Type: Public
- Established: 1884; 142 years ago
- Affiliations: EUA; ACU; HEA; Universities UK; EIBFS
- Chancellor: Sir Robin Williams
- Vice-Chancellor: Edmund Burke
- Students: 9,935 (2024/25)
- Undergraduates: 6,665 (2024/25)
- Postgraduates: 3,270 (2024/25)
- Location: Bangor, Wales; 53.2289°N 4.1301°W
- Campus: Bangor
Colours
Academic:
Athletic Union:
- Website: bangor.ac.uk

Bangor University (Welsh: Prifysgol Bangor) is a public research university in Bangor, Gwynedd, Wales. It was established in 1884 as the University College of North Wales (UCNW; Welsh: Coleg Prifysgol Gogledd Cymru, CPGC), and received a Royal Charter in 1885. In 1893 it became one of the founding institutions of the federal University of Wales. In 1996, after structural changes to the University of Wales, it became known as the University of Wales, Bangor (UWB; Welsh: Prifysgol Cymru, Bangor). It became independent of the University of Wales in 2007, adopting its current name and awarding its own degrees.

The university has over 10,000 students across three academic colleges and eleven schools, as well as several large research institutes. Its campus makes up a large part of Bangor and extends to nearby Menai Bridge as well, with a second campus in Wrexham teaching some healthcare courses.

Its total income for 2022/23 was £178.0 million, of which 19% came from research grants, and it has an endowment of £8.2 million. Its alumni include several fellows of the Royal Society, as well as heads of state and Nobel Prize winners.

== History ==
=== University College ===
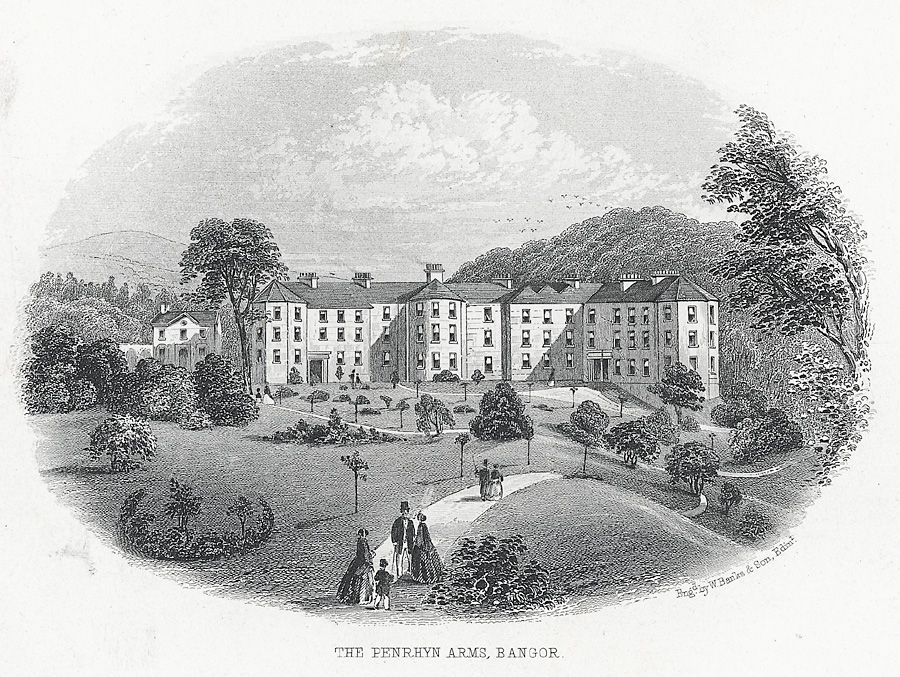
The pre-1911 home of the University College of North Wales, otherwise the Penrhyn Arms Hotel, now demolished

==== Origins ====
In 1858, the British and Foreign School Society and Hugh Owen founded the Normal College, Bangor, for training teachers for its British Schools in Wales.

In October 1872, University College Wales, Aberystwyth opened, with 26 students. In October 1875, chapels in Wales raised the next tranche of funds from over 70,000 contributors.

The foundation of the University College of North Wales in 1884 was the result of a campaign for better higher education in Wales. In 1880, parliament appointed Lord Aberdare to chair a Departmental Committee on Intermediate and Higher Education in Wales and Monmouthshire, and in 1881 it published the Aberdare Report, which recommended the creation of two further university colleges in Wales, one in the south and another in the north. At the beginning of 1883, a conference took place at Chester to consider the question of a college for North Wales, and this passed a resolution which created a committee for choosing a location and pursuing the matter. In January, Lord Penrhyn, Lord Lieutenant of Caernarvonshire, promised a contribution of £1,000. By May of that year, £6,000 had been raised for establishing such a college, and the British government had promised an annual grant of £4,000 towards its running costs. As it became clear that the planning was likely to succeed, there was intense rivalry among the towns of North Wales over which was to be the home of the new college, and several of them established local committees to pursue their claims. Bangor, Caernarfon, Conwy, Denbigh, Rhyl, and Wrexham were on the shortlist of the General Purposes Committee of the College for North Wales, and in the end Bangor was chosen.

The arrangements for the college's future were secured and settled by the General Purposes Committee and the Draft and Charter Committee in the first half of 1884. In May, a report was published which stated that the Penrhyn Arms Hotel, Bangor, had been leased from Lord Penrhyn for twenty years, at a rent of £200 a year, with the option to terminate the lease after seven or fourteen years. Work to adapt the hotel for use by the new college began in June. A College Council was established, chaired by Colonel the Hon. William E. Sackville-West, meeting initially at a hotel in Chester. Henry Reichel, a 27-year-old Fellow of All Souls College, Oxford, was appointed as the college's first Principal, and applications were invited for teaching positions. It was announced that the college would open in the third week in October, and the Earl of Derby was invited to give an inaugural address. Sackville-West petitioned Queen Victoria for a Royal charter of incorporation for the college at Bangor, and it was hoped that this would be considered at a Privy Council meeting on 21 October. The first Duke of Westminster, Lord Penrhyn, and others, gave scholarships, and in the second week of September examinations for these took place in several towns. The names of the scholars were announced on 20 September. Three of the six scholarships worth £50 a year each were awarded, and seven out of the eight scholarships worth £30 each. Others wishing to join the college as students were invited to send their names to the Registrar by 4 October, together with a birth certificate and "a satisfactory testimonial to character".

There was a formal opening ceremony at the Penrhyn Arms Hotel, renamed as Penrhyn Hall, on 18 October 1884, and in the event the inaugural address was by the Earl of Powis, the college's first president. There was then a procession to the college including 3,000 quarrymen, as quarrymen from Penrhyn Quarry and other quarries had subscribed more than £1,200 for the college.

==== Early years ====
When the college opened in October 1884 it had just 58 students, who were to receive their degrees from the University of London. At the outset, it had academic staff teaching Greek, philosophy, mathematics, history, English, physics, and chemistry. It was incorporated by a Royal Charter in 1885.

The relationship with the University of London continued until 1893, when the college became a founding constituent institution of the federal University of Wales. In that year, the "Bangor dispute" led to the closure of the Women's Hall. Its head, Frances Hughes, who was in the eye of the storm, resigned from the college.

==== 20th century ====
In 1903, the city of Bangor donated a 10-acre site at Penrallt for a new college building, and funds for it were raised by local people. The new building, now known as Main Arts, was opened in 1911.

During the Second World War, paintings from national art galleries were stored in the Prichard-Jones Hall at UCNW, to protect them from enemy bombing. They were later moved to slate mines at Blaenau Ffestiniog. Students from University College London were evacuated to continue their studies in a safer environment at Bangor.

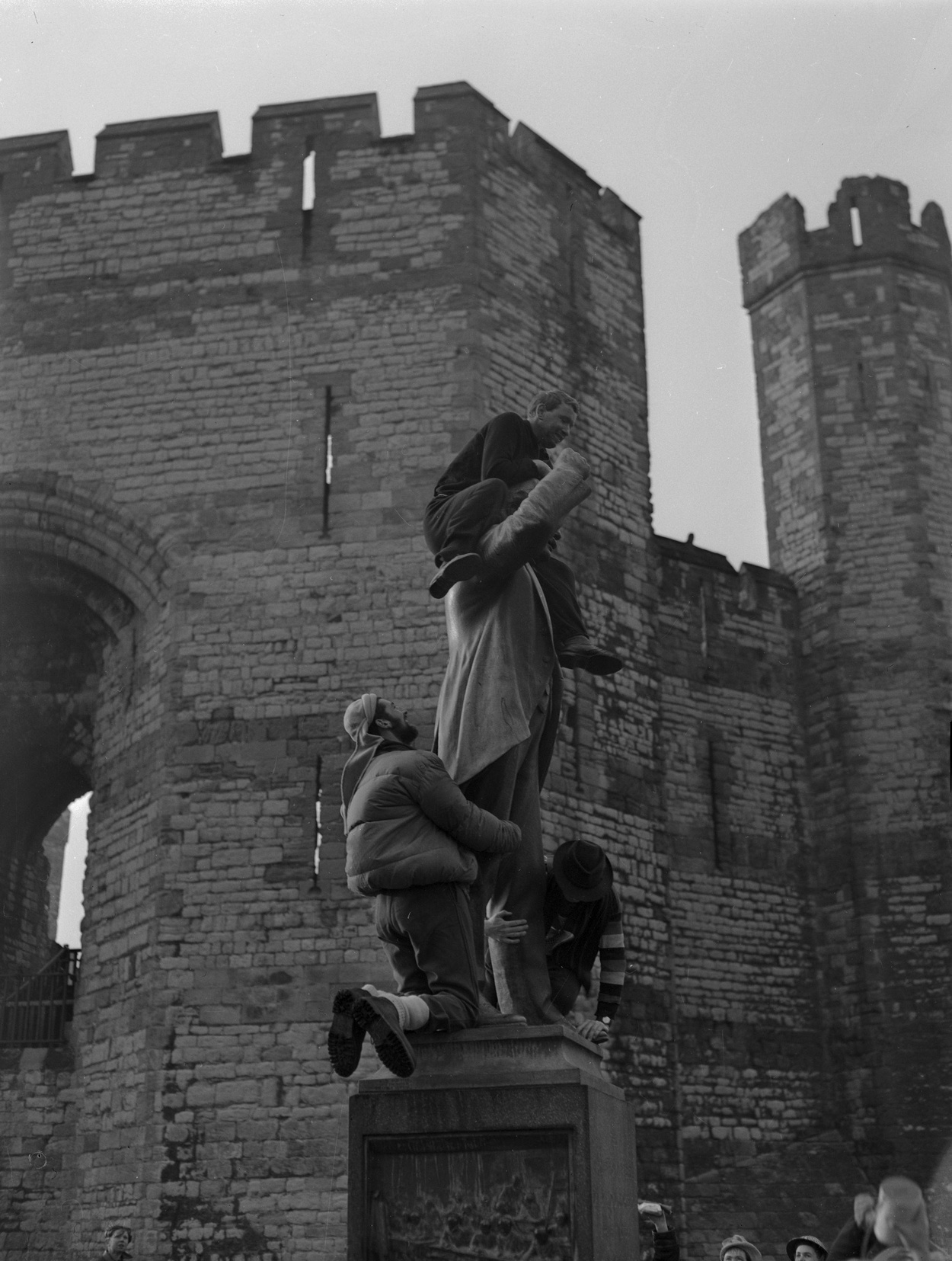
Bangor students scale a statue during the Wythnos Rag (Rag week) of 1960.

During the 1960s, the university shared in the general expansion of higher education in the United Kingdom following the Robbins Report, with many new departments and new buildings. In 1967, the Bangor Normal College, now part of the university, was the venue for lectures on Transcendental Meditation by the Maharishi Mahesh Yogi at which the Beatles heard of the death of their manager, Brian Epstein.

Student protests at UCNW in the 1970s focused mainly on calls to expand the role of the Welsh language. Radical students would disturb lectures held in English and paint slogans in Welsh on the walls of the Main Building, resulting in some suspensions of these activists. In the early 1980s, the Thatcher government even considered closing down the institution. Around this time consideration began of mergers with two colleges of education in Bangor: St Mary's College, a college for women studying to become schoolteachers, and the larger and older Normal College. The merger of St Mary's into UCNW was concluded in 1977, but the merger with Normal College fell through in the 1970s and was not completed until 1996.

Alongside the eventual merger of Normal College, the North Wales College of Nursing and Midwifery merged with the university in 1992, forming a new Faculty of Health Studies. A year later it also took over the small North Wales College of Radiography.

=== Independence and development ===
The university made a formal application for degree-awarding powers in 2005. The 2007 a change of name to Bangor University, or Prifysgol Bangor in Welsh, was instigated by the university following the decision of the University of Wales to change from a federal university to a confederal non-membership organisation, and the granting of degree-awarding powers to Bangor University itself.

As a result, every student starting after 2009 gained a degree from Bangor University, while any student who started before 2009 had the option to have either Bangor University or University of Wales Bangor on their degree certificate.

Despite the effective abolition of the federal university system, a research and enterprise partnership with Aberystwyth University was agreed in 2006, with £11 million of funding from the Higher Education Funding Council for Wales.

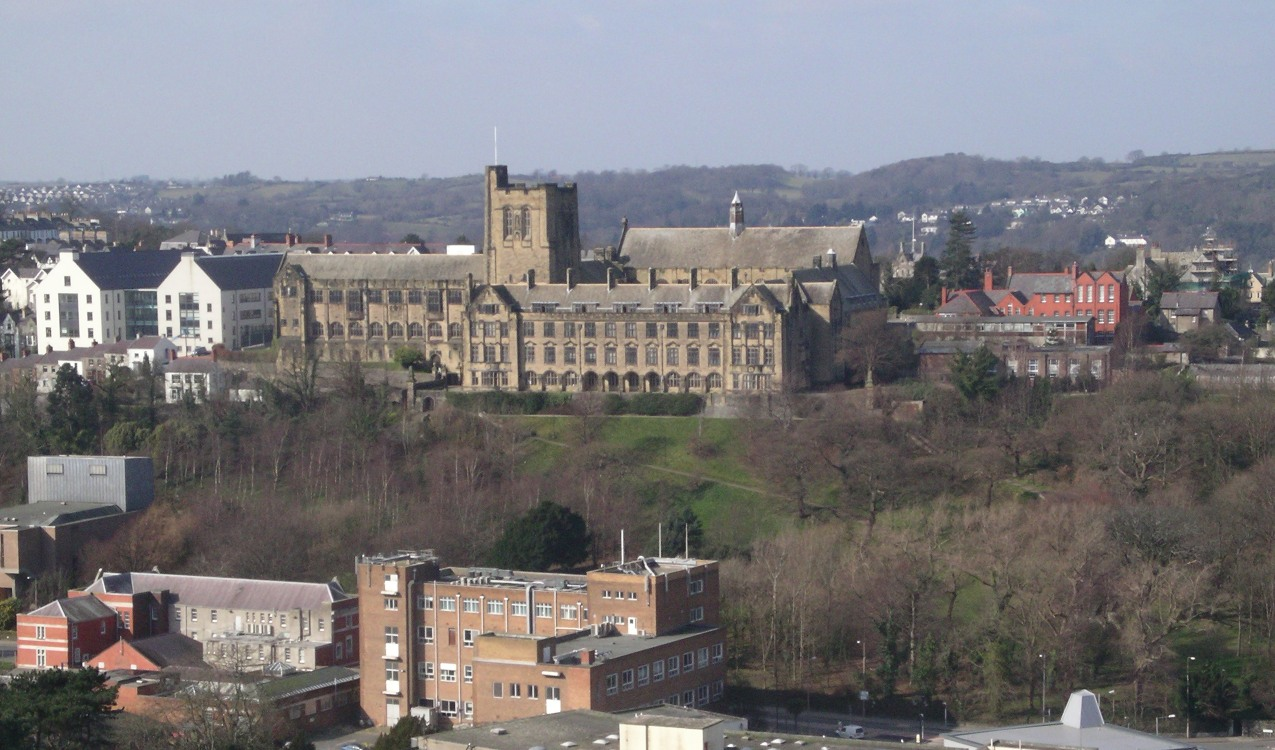
Main Arts and other Bangor University buildings from Bangor Mountain

==== Expansion and financial issues ====
Under John Hughes' leadership as Vice-Chancellor from 2010 to 2018, there were several new developments including the opening of St Mary's Student Village, and the first-ever collaboration between Wales and China to establish a new college, which involved Bangor University and the Central South University of Forestry and Technology (CSUFT).

In 2014, the university secured a £45M loan from the European Investment Bank, to assist the university in developing its estates strategy. In 2016, the university opened Marine Centre Wales, a £5.5M building on the site of the university's Ocean Sciences campus in Menai Bridge, which was financed as part of the £25 million SEACAMS project, partly funded through the European Regional Development Fund.

In May 2017, Bangor became the fourth Welsh university to review its cost base to make savings of £8.5M. The university responded and introduced several cost-saving measures including a reorganisation of the structure of Colleges and Schools and the introduction of a voluntary severance scheme, and several compulsory redundancies was reduced from the initial estimate of 170. In addressing its financial challenges, Bangor University also reorganised some subject areas in 2017, which involved introducing new ways of coordinating and delivering adult education and part-time degree programmes, continuing to teach archaeology, but discontinuing the single honours course, and working with Grwp Llandrillo Menai to validate the BA Fine Arts degree.

Other issues which attracted adverse media comment included the cost overrun and delayed opening of the Pontio Arts and Innovation Centre in 2016, the appointment of Hughes's then wife to a newly created senior management position, the purchase and refurbishment of a house for the vice-chancellor by the university for £750,000, the expenses of some senior staff, and the discrepancy between senior management salaries and remuneration for staff working on zero hour contracts.

The university announced Hughes' early resignation in December 2018, after allegations of harassment were made against him by his ex-wife and student protests against staff cuts and the closure of the chemistry department.

In June 2019, the university launched a consultation to concentrate its non-residential estate onto a single campus in Bangor (Deiniol Road and College Road sites) and dispose of some major sites (including Normal Site, Dean Street and Fron Heulog), 25 per cent of the estate.

February 2020 saw a 14-day strike from staff in response to pay and working conditions. In September 2020, the university announced a new round of cuts to fill a £13M gap in the budget, saying 200 more jobs (including 80 academic posts) were at risk. Another reorganisation of the university's structure of Colleges and Schools was announced as well. Staff passed a motion of no confidence in the university management.

==== Development of new schools ====
In 2021 the Welsh Government announced plans to expand medical teaching at the university in collaboration with Cardiff University School of Medicine, to establish an independent medical school in North Wales following several years of delivering the franchised C21 North Wales for Cardiff. The independent North Wales Medical School admitted its first intake of 80 students in September 2024.

In 2025, the Albert Gubay Charitable Foundation donated £10.5 million to the university, for the redevelopment of Bangor Business School. It will be used to fund a new premises and the school will be renamed to the Albert Gubay Business School.

== Campuses and buildings ==
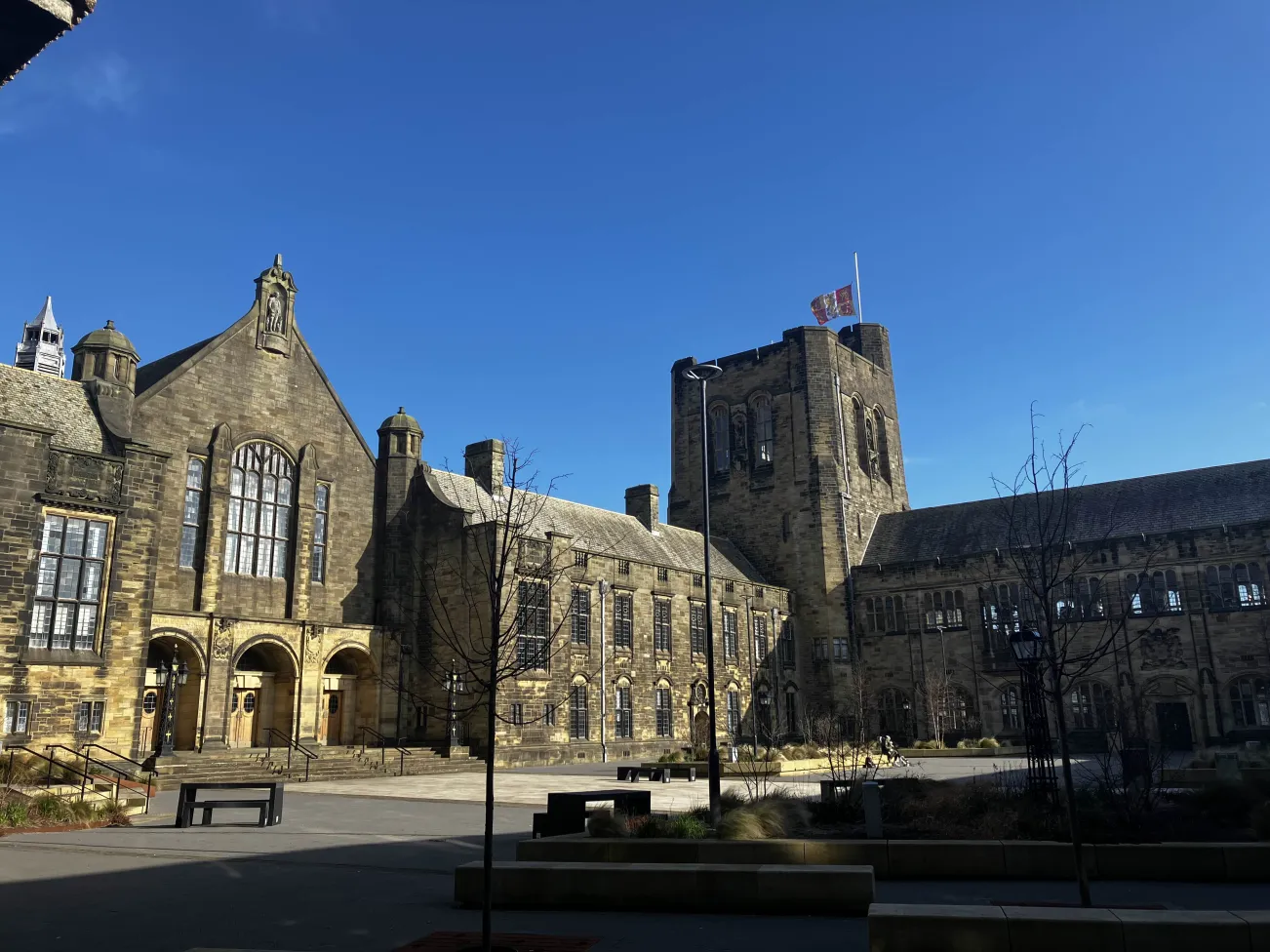
The outer quadrangle, Main Arts.

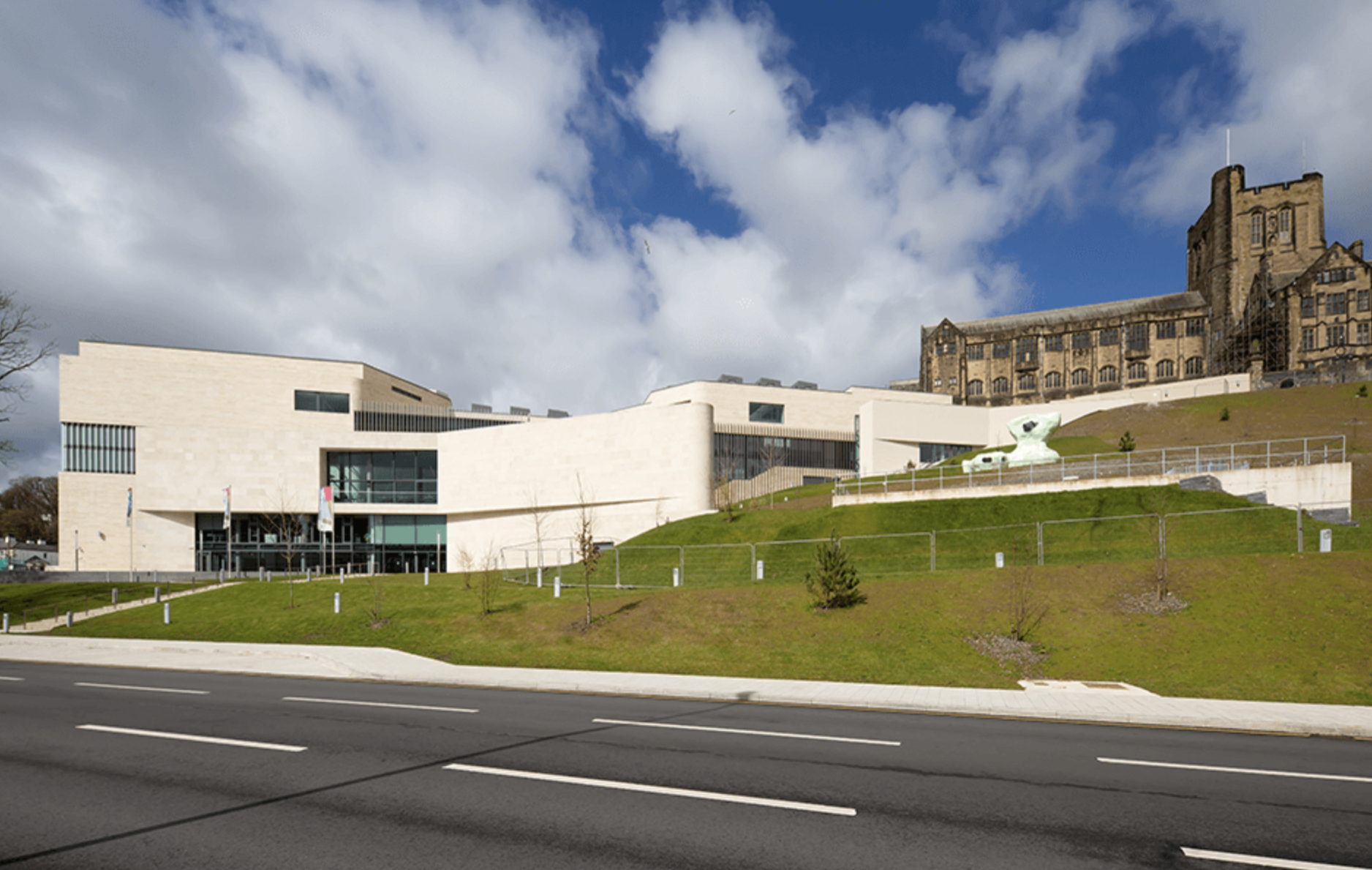
Pontio, the university's SU and arts centre.

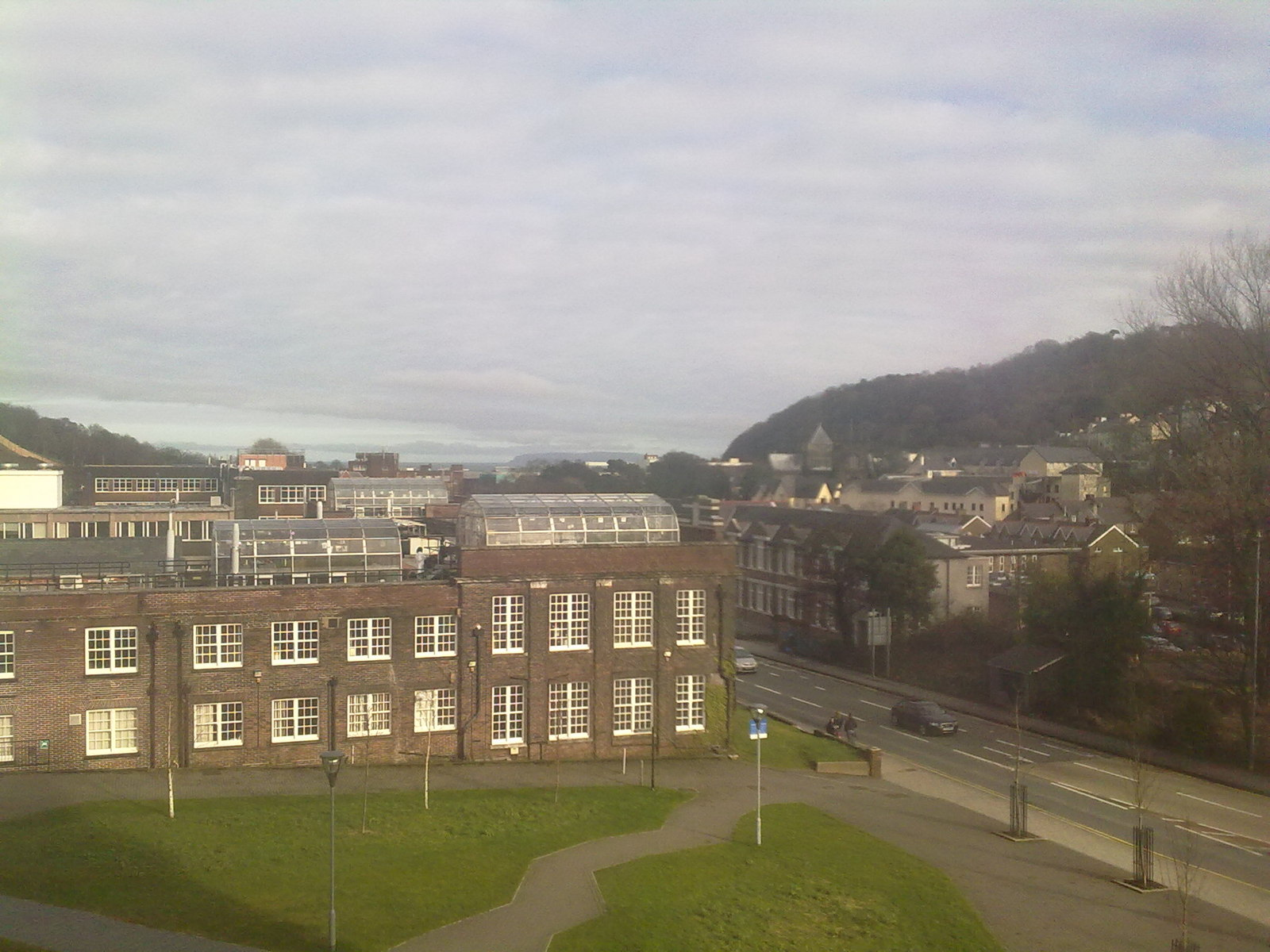
The science buildings.

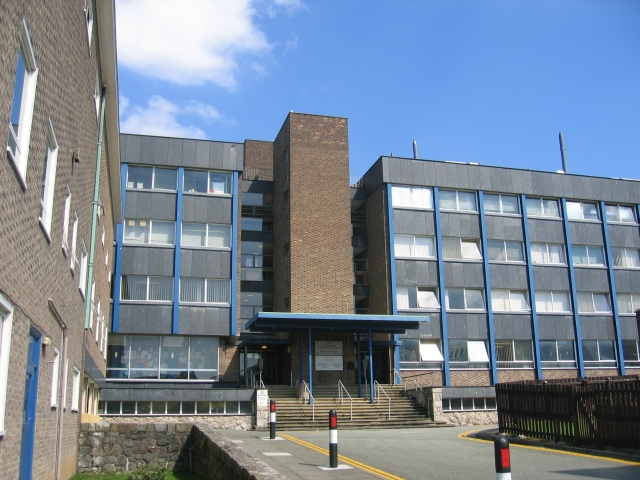
The School of Engineering at Dean Street.

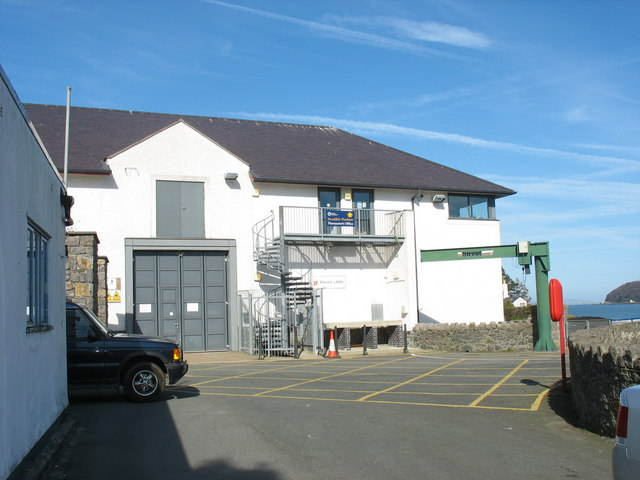
The marine laboratories in Menai Bridge.

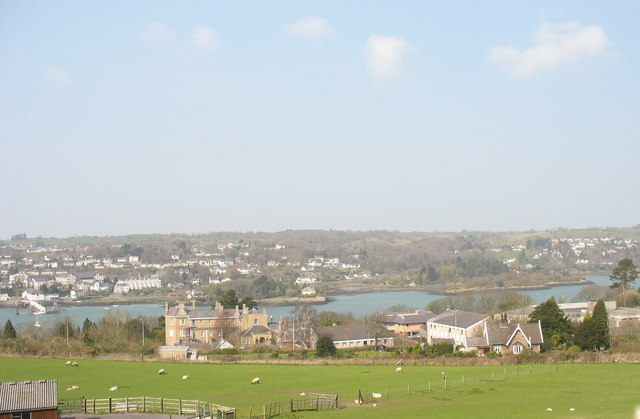
A view of Normal Site.

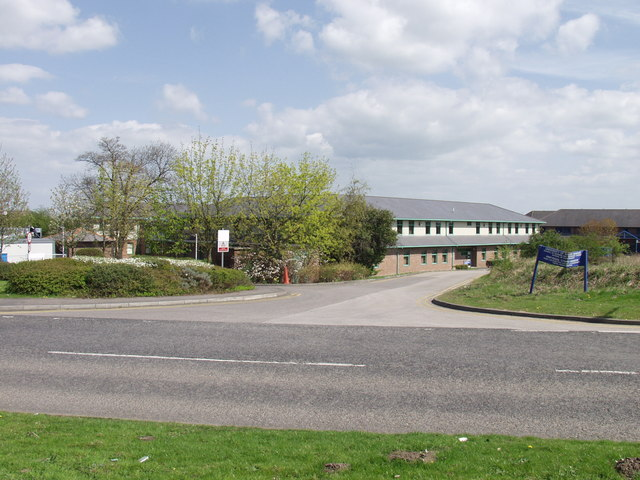
The School of Health Sciences in Wrexham.

The university occupies substantial buildings in and around Bangor, whilst the School of Health Sciences also operate facilities within Wrexham Technology Park. Most are clustered around 4 main campuses, with many outliers.

=== College Road ===
The university was originally based in an old coaching inn, the Penrhyn Arms Hotel, which housed its 58 students and its 12 teaching staff. In 1911 it moved to a much larger new building, which is now the old part of the Main Arts. This building, designed by Henry Hare, had its foundation stone laid by King Edward VII on 9 July 1907 and was formally opened by King George V in 1911. The iconic building, which occupies a highly visible position overlooking Bangor, gave the college its Welsh nickname Y Coleg ar y Bryn ("The College on the Hill"). It included the large Prichard-Jones Hall, named after Sir John Prichard-Jones who was a substantial benefactor of the building. It became grade I-listed building in 1949. A modern extension, completing a quadrangle on the College Road side of the building, was completed in 1969, known as New Arts. In 1991, the Brigantia building was also built next to it in a similar, though contemporary, style. It now houses the medical, psychology, and sports science schools.

Opposite Main Arts is Hen Goleg (English: Old College), historically home to the Normal College. It now houses the law department and, until development of a new premises in 2027, the business school. Around this is the Management Centre, a hotel that was formerly the halls for the college, and Neuadd John Phillips (English: John Phillips Hall), a theatre that was built for the college, and now used by the University.

=== Deiniol Road (science buildings) ===
Along Deiniol Road, which runs through the centre of Bangor, are a variety of science laboratory buildings. Most notable of these is the Memorial Building, which alongside the nearby Memorial Arch was built in 1921 to commemorate the First World War; and the brutalist Brambell building, which houses the School of Environmental Sciences.

Formerly, the students' union and Theatre Gwynedd also had buildings on Deiniol Road; these were demolished and replaced with Pontio, a new arts and innovation centre, in 2016. The building includes teaching and social spaces and now houses the offices of the students' union.

=== Dean Street ===
The current Dean Street campus was constructed in 1965 for the engineering and computing departments. On 22 November 1965, during its construction, a crane collapsed on the building. The three-ton counterweight hit the second-floor lecture theatre in the original building about thirty minutes before it would have been occupied by about 80 first-year students. The counterweight went through to the ground floor.

The university's partner nightclub, Trilogy, is also located on Dean Street.

=== Normal Site ===
Normal Site, on the Bangor side of the Menai Strait, was originally part of the Normal College. Whilst substantially decommissioned, it is partially still used for the university's sports science and product design departments.

=== Menai Bridge ===
Ocean and marine sciences are based across the strait in nearby Menai Bridge. Piers and a small marina house the university's fleet of boats and the research vessel Prince Madog.

== Organisation ==
=== Colleges and schools ===
The academic activities of Bangor University are organised into three colleges, which provide operational support to the schools. The colleges system was established in 2006, replacing the previous faculties.

As of 2025, the schools are set to change as part of a restructure, though the colleges will remain the same.

| College of Arts, Humanities and Social Sciences | College of Science and Engineering | College of Medicine and Health |
|---|---|---|
| Albert Gubay Business School; School of History, Law and Social Sciences; School of Arts, Culture and Language; North Wales School of Education; School of Welsh | School of Computer Science and Engineering; Nuclear Futures Institute; School of Environmental and Natural Sciences; School of Ocean Sciences; BioComposites Centre | School of Health Sciences; School of Psychology and Sport Science; North Wales Medical School; Bangor Institute for Health and Medical Research |

=== Arts, Humanities and Social Sciences ===
==== School of Welsh ====
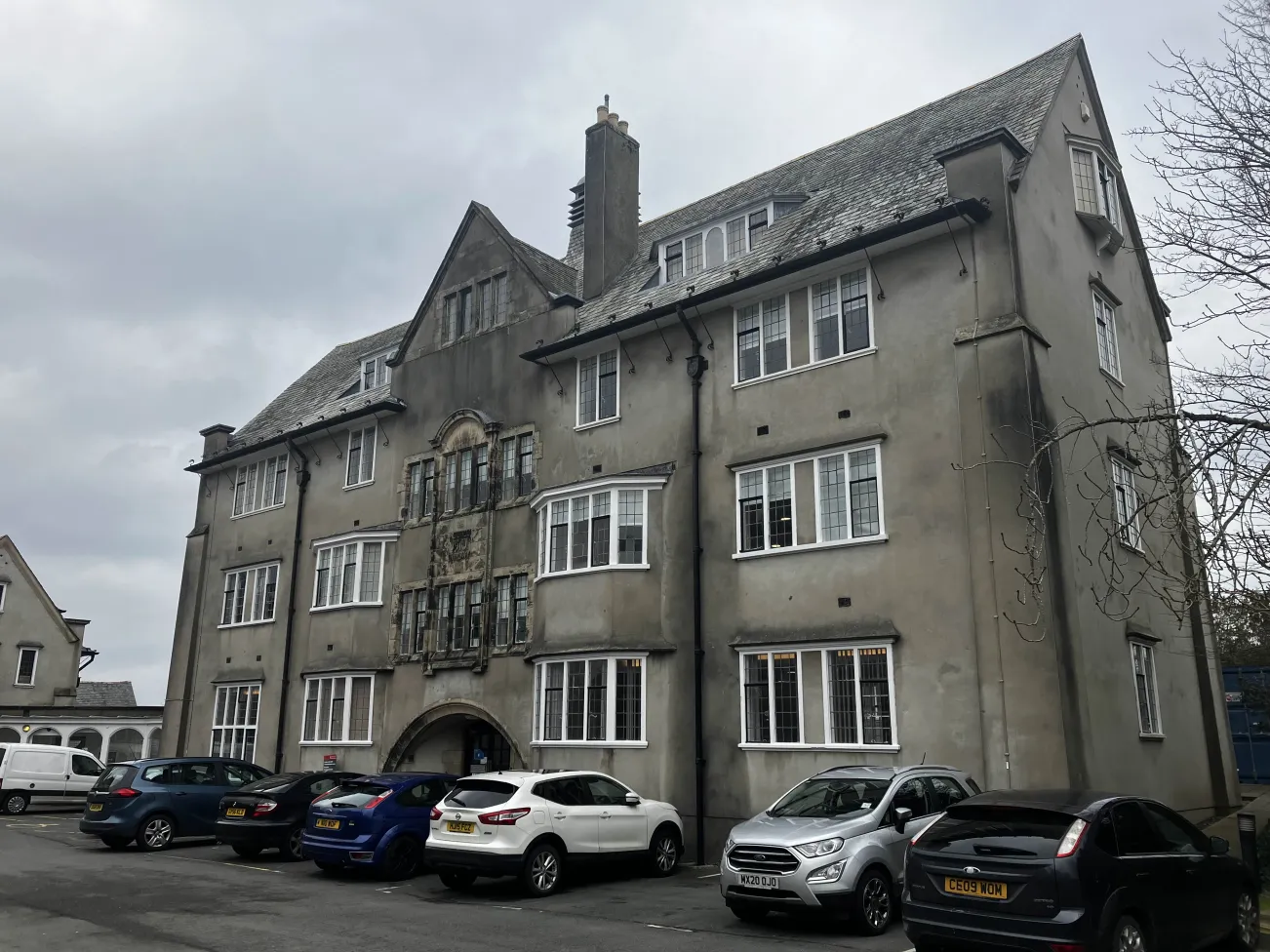
School of Welsh

The School of Welsh is the school of Welsh language and Celtic studies at the university. The first chair in Welsh was established at the university in 1894, for Sir John Morris-Jones. Prior to this the university council had considered establishing a chair in Welsh and classics but struggled to find a candidate. In 1920, a second chair in Welsh literature was established, the first holder being Ifor Williams. Whilst there had been a department previously, a School of Welsh-Medium Studies was formally instituted in 1986.

At undergraduate level, the school offers single-honours degrees in Welsh and joint-honours degrees in Welsh with arts and humanities subjects.

=== Governance ===
Governance of Bangor University is set out by its charter. It is ultimately governed by a council, which oversees the university's strategic direction, financial health, and policy compliance. Its senate manages all academic matters, such as teaching and research standards. The executive, led by the vice-chancellor, handles the day-to-day administration and implementation of strategic decisions.

The current vice-chancellor is Edmund Burke. He is supported by a deputy vice-chancellor and four pro-vice-chancellors.

Various committees support these bodies in specialized areas, and students are actively involved in governance through representation on key committees. The university is also accountable to external bodies like the Higher Education Funding Council for Wales.

== Academic profile ==
=== Research ===
The university's research expertise in the areas of materials science and predictive modelling was enhanced in 2017 through a collaboration with Imperial College London and the formation of the Nuclear Futures Institute at Bangor with the award of £6.5m in funding under the Welsh Government's Ser Cymru programme.

The university-owned £20m Science Park on Anglesey, M-Sparc was completed in March 2018, which will support the development of the region's low-carbon energy sector.

=== Rankings ===
Rankings
National rankings
- Complete (2027): 49
- Guardian (2027): 64
- Times / Sunday Times (2027): 53

Global rankings
- ARWU (2026): 401–500
- QS (2027): 567=
- THE (2026): 501–600

The 2014 Research Excellence Framework recognised that more than three-quarters of Bangor's research is either world-leading or internationally excellent. Based on the university submission of 14 Units of Assessment, 77% of the research was rated in the top two tiers of research quality, ahead of the average for all UK universities.

In 2017, Bangor University became the only university in Wales to be rated 'Gold' by the new Teaching Excellence Framework (TEF) which means that the university is deemed to be of the highest quality found in the UK, providing "consistently outstanding teaching, learning and outcomes for its students."

In recent years, Bangor has been rated highly by its students in two independent surveys of student opinion. In the National Student Survey, the university has been consistently ranked highly both within Wales and in the UK higher education sector. In 2017, Bangor University's students placed the university eighth among the UK's non-specialist universities and second among Welsh Universities.

For the second year in a row, Bangor was awarded Best University in the UK for Clubs and Societies at the 2018 WhatUni Student Choice Awards. It also regained the award for best Student Accommodation which it originally won in 2016. The university was also placed second overall for 'Courses and Lecturers' and retained third place in the category 'University of the Year'. WhatUni award nominations are based on the reviews and opinions of the university's students. This is the fourth year in a row that Bangor University has won a national WhatUni Award.

== Student life ==
=== Halls of residence ===
University Hall, built in red brick a Queen Anne style, was the first substantial block. It was opened in 1897. This building was to become the Welsh-language hall Neuadd John Morris-Jones in 1974, taking its name in honour of John Morris Jones. It is now called Neuadd Rathbone.

Neuadd Reichel, built on the Ffriddoedd Farm site, was designed in a neo-Georgian style by the architect Percy Thomas and was opened in 1942 as a hostel for male students.

Expansion in the 1960s led to the development of Plas Gwyn in 1963–64 and Neuadd Emrys Evans in 1965, both on the Ffriddoedd site, and Neuadd Rathbone at the top of Love Lane in 1965. Neuadd Rathbone, designed by Colwyn Foulkes and named after the second president of the college, was originally for women students only. The names of Neuadd Rathbone and Neuadd John Morris-Jones were later exchanged. The building originally opened as Neuadd Rathbone is now known as Neuadd Garth, and is now no longer in use.

Accommodation is guaranteed for all first-year undergraduate students. There are around 3,000 rooms available in halls of residence, all within under 20 minutes walking distance of the university. Three residential sites are currently in use: Ffriddoedd Village, St Mary's Village and Neuadd Garth. Launderette services on all three sites are provided by Circuit Laundry.

==== Ffriddoedd Village ====
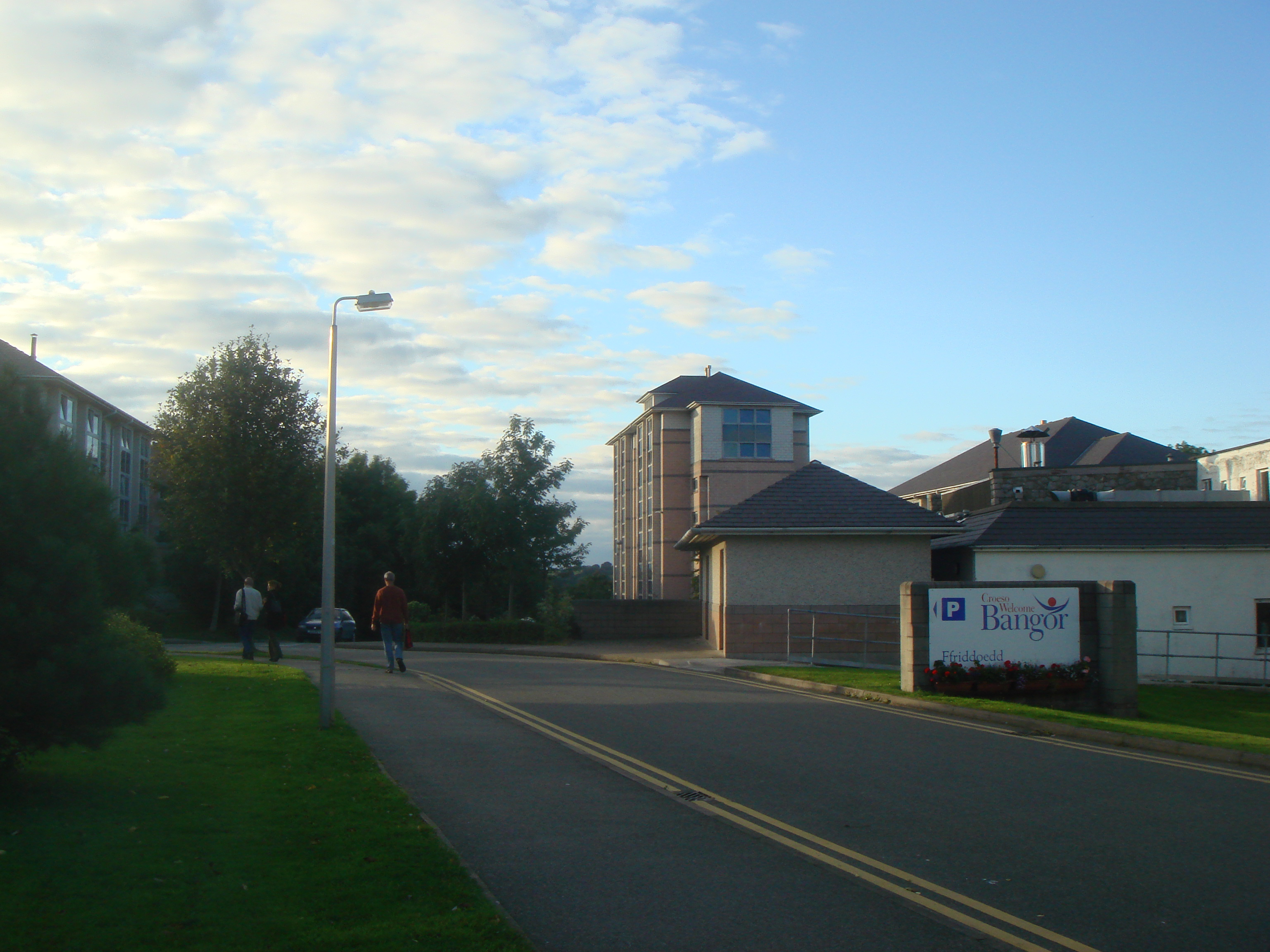
Ffriddoedd Halls of Residence village with Neuadd John Morris-Jones in the background

The largest accommodation site is the Ffriddoedd Village in Upper Bangor, about ten minutes' walk from Top College, the Science Site and the city centre. This site has eleven en-suite halls completed in 2009, six other en-suite halls built in the 1990s and Neuadd Reichel built in the 1940s, and renovated in 2011.

Neuadd John Morris-Jones is a Welsh-speaking hall, which started its life in 1974 on College Road and has, along with its equivalent Neuadd Pantycelyn in Aberystwyth, became a focal point of Welsh-language activities at the university. It is an integral part of UMCB, the Welsh Students' Union, which in turn is part of the main Students' Union.

The halls on "Ffridd" (ffridd [friːð] is the Welsh word for mountain pasture or sheep path; ffriddoedd [ˈfrɪðɔið] is its plural form) include Cefn y Coed, Glyder, Y Borth, Elidir, J.M.J. Bryn Dinas and J.M.J. Tegfan, all of which were built in the early 1990s; Adda, Alaw, Braint, Crafnant, Enlli, Peris, Glaslyn, Llanddwyn, Ffraw, Idwal and Gwynant, which were all built in the late 2000s; and Neuadd Reichel which was built in the 1940s and renovated in 2011. From 2021, Neuadd Reichel will no longer be used for student accommodation.

==== St Mary's Village ====
Bryn Eithin (English: Gorse Hill) overlooks the centre of Bangor and is close to the Dean Street campus, as well as the city's high street. Demolition of the former St Mary's Site halls, except the 1902 buildings and the Quadrangle, began in 2014 to make way for new halls which were completed in 2015. The halls on this site are Cybi, Penmon, and Cemlyn, which are all self-catered flats; Tudno, which is a townhouse complex; and the original St. Mary's building, with studios and flats.

==== Private halls ====
A private hall of residence called Tŷ Willis House (formerly known as Neuadd Willis) is operated by IQ Student Accommodation; which incorporates the old listed British Hotel with a new extension to the rear, and a further hall on the site of the old Plaza Cinema. Other privately owned halls of residence in Bangor include Neuadd Kyffin, Neuadd y Castell, Neuadd Llys y Deon and Neuadd Tŷ Ni.

=== Students' union ===
Undeb Bangor (English: Bangor Union) is Bangor University's students' union, providing services, support, and activities for students. All students automatically become members unless they opt-out. Annual elections are held for five sabbatical officers: the president, the Welsh union President, and vice-presidents for education, societies and volunteering, and sports.

In January 2016 the students' union moved to the new Pontio Arts and Innovation Centre, as it its old Deiniol road facilities were demolished.

==== Student representation ====
The Student Council is a forum that meets monthly in the academic year to discuss, debate, and pass ideas, as well as work alongside the sabbatical officers on projects to improve the student experience.

A representative is also elected from each school, supported by representatives from individual programmes, to inform academic decision-making.

==== Societies and volunteering ====
There are around 100 student societies in the union. Membership of the societies was free until 2025, when the union began to implement a paid structure as a result of funding issues.

The oldest extant society is the Debating and Political Society, which was founded in 1849. Other prominent societies have included the Welsh Language Society and Cymric Society, which led protests in the 1970s.

SVB (Student Volunteering Bangor) is the volunteering branch of the students' union, which has supported community projects in and around the Bangor area since 1952. SVB volunteers provide a total of around 600 hours of work per week on 58 community-based projects, including projects on mental health, children, the environment, the elderly and community & sports projects. SVB works closely with charities, organisations and schools around Bangor and North Wales, as well as further afield.

=== Sports and varsity ===
Sports at Bangor University are managed by the Athletics Union, a part of Undeb Bangor. Notable sports clubs include Bangor University F.C. and Bangor University Rowing Club.

Every year the university competes against Aberystwyth University in Varsity, a sporting tournament which sees hundreds of students compete in over 40 sporting events for the Varsity Trophy.

=== Academic dress ===
The university's dress was established in 2007 on its independence from the University of Wales. Prior to this it used the academic dress of the University of Wales, itself established in 1893. Bachelors' gowns use the traditional Welsh style gown, in black with the lower 6" of the forearm seam left open and folded back, held by 2 buttons, with third button on seam in middle. Masters' gowns no longer use the traditional Welsh style, but a plain long-sleeved style, also in black. Doctorates wear a maroon gown, with 4" red and 1" gold facings. Its sleeves are lined with red and red and turnback held with gold cord and button. The yoke is also lined with gold cord and button. Higher doctorates wear the same but in scarlet, with a plain scarlet neck band.

All hoods are a combination of the university's red and gold colours. There is no difference between hoods for subject areas, only degree levels. All graduates and postgraduates up until doctorates wear a plain black cloth mortarboard. Doctorates wear a black cloth (or velvet for higher doctorates) bonnet with gold and red cord and tassels.

== Notable people associated with Bangor ==
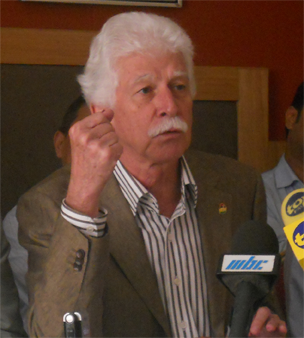
Paul Bérenger

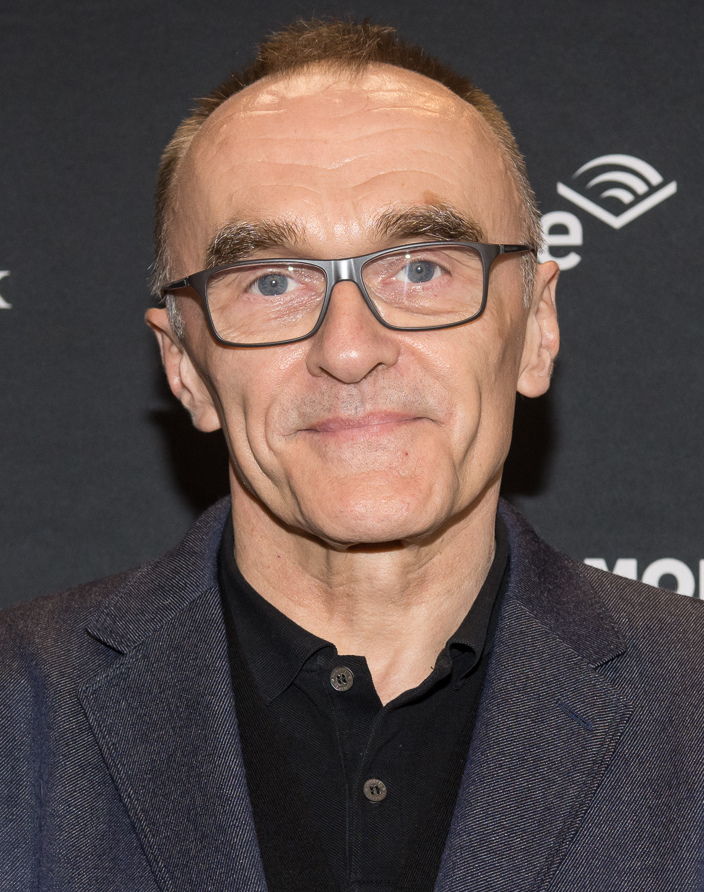
Danny Boyle

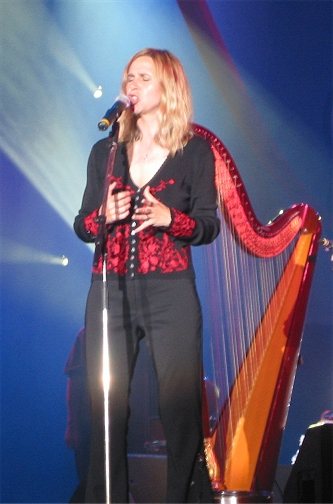
Siân James

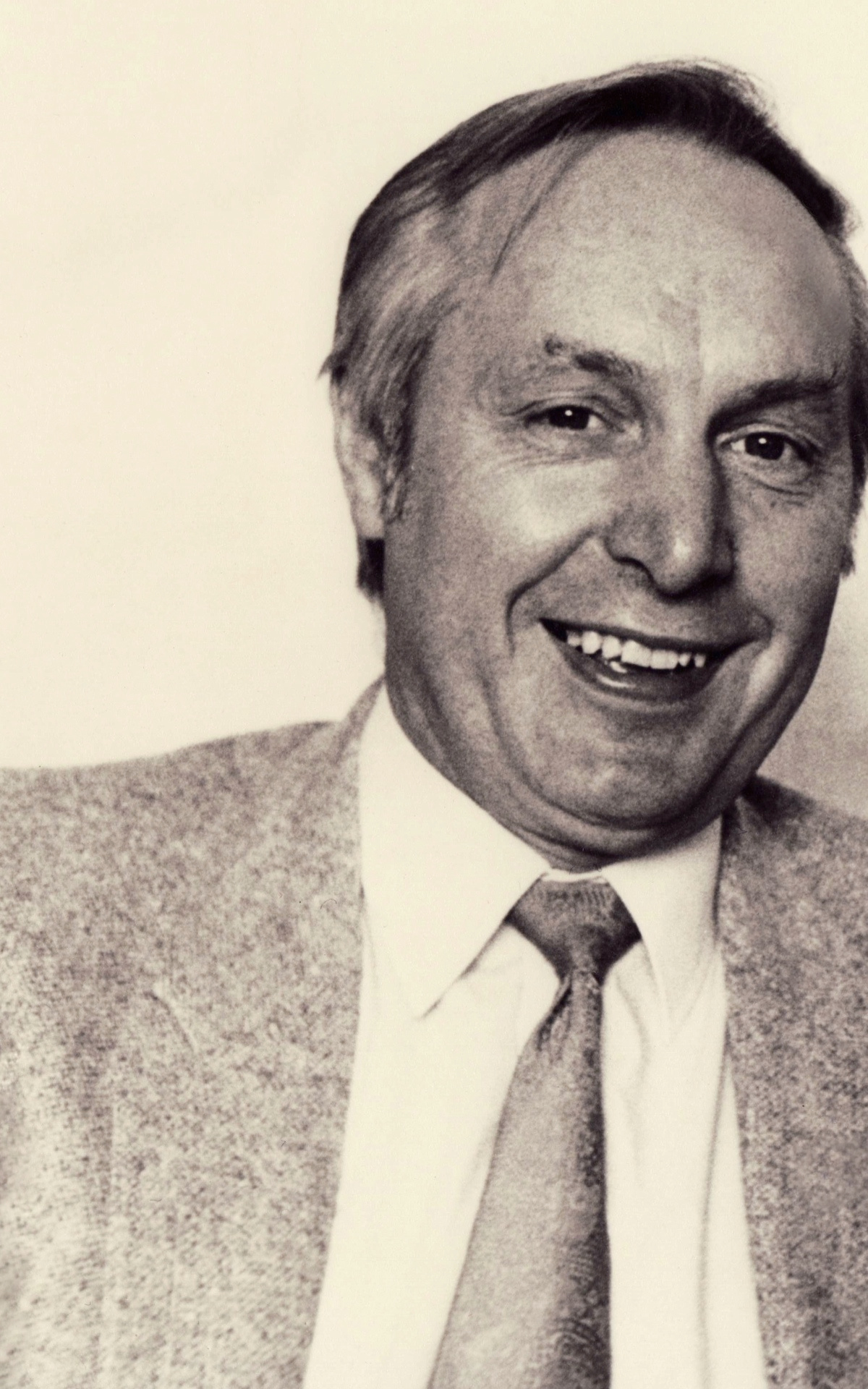
Tom Parry Jones

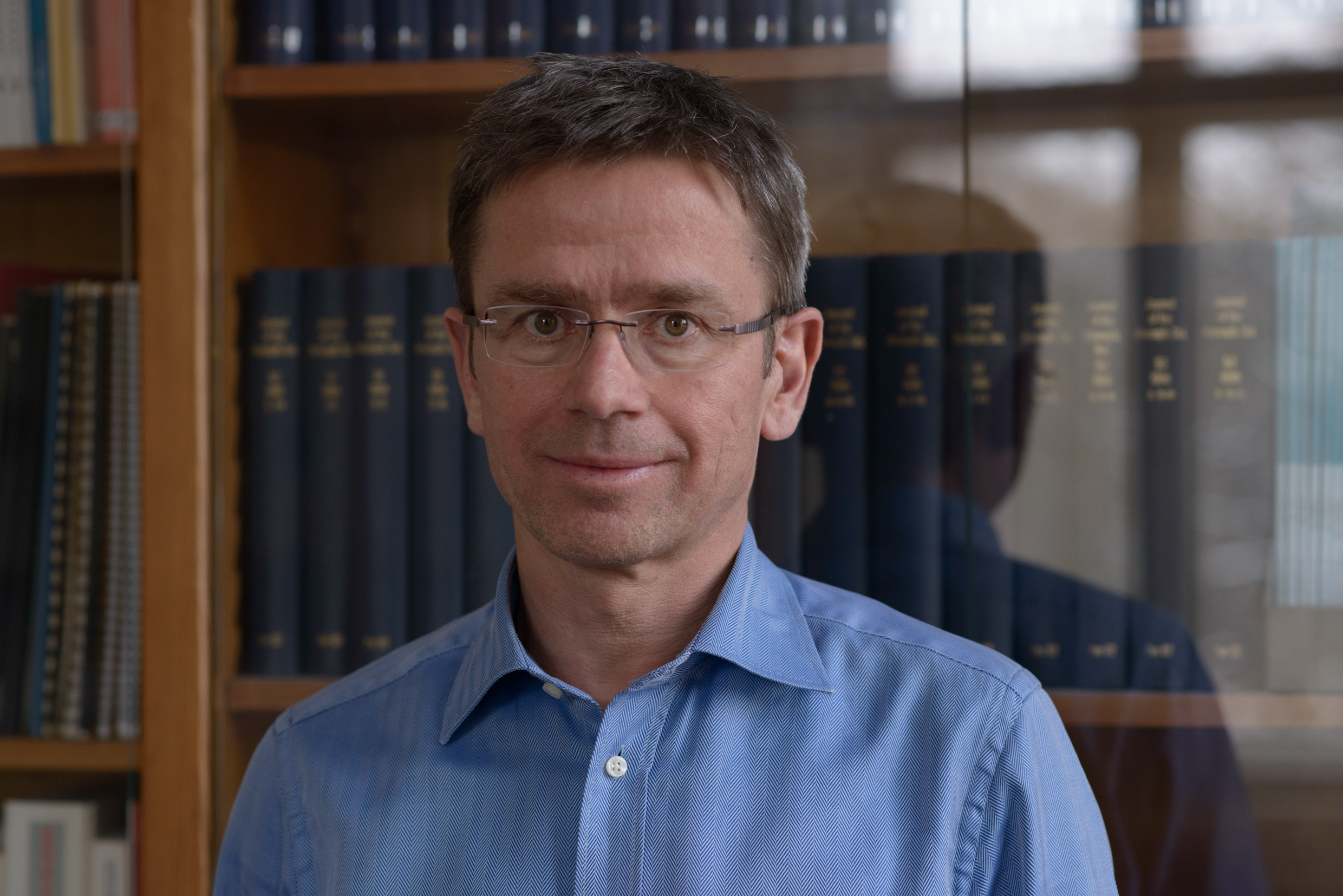
Stefan Rahmstorf

=== Presidents/Chancellors ===
- Edward Herbert, 3rd Earl of Powis, 1884–1891
- William Rathbone 1891–1900
- Lloyd Tyrell-Kenyon, 4th Baron Kenyon 1900–1927
- Herbert Gladstone, 1st Viscount Gladstone 1927–1935
- Lord Howard de Walden 1935–1940
- William Ormsby-Gore, 4th Baron Harlech 1940–1945
- Charles Paget, 6th Marquess of Anglesey 1945–1947
- Lloyd Tyrell-Kenyon, 5th Baron Kenyon 1947–1982
- William Mars-Jones 1982–1995
- Cledwyn Hughes 1995–2000
- Dafydd Elis-Thomas 2000–2017
- George Meyrick 2017–2022
- Sir Robin Williams 2022–present

=== Vice Chancellors ===
The university has had nine Principals/Vice-Chancellors:

- Henry Reichel, Principal 1884–1927
- David Emrys Evans, Principal 1927–1958
- Charles Evans, Principal 1958–1984
- Eric Sunderland, Principal, Vice-Chancellor 1984–1995
- Roy Evans, Vice-Chancellor 1995–2004
- Merfyn Jones, Vice-Chancellor, 2004–2010
- John G. Hughes, Vice-Chancellor 2010–2018
- Graham Upton, Vice-Chancellor 2018–2019
- Iwan Davies, Vice-Chancellor 2019–2022
- Edmund Burke, Vice-Chancellor 2022–present

=== Notable academics ===
- Nathan Abrams, professor of film studies, historian of Jewish communities in Wales, 2006–present
- Samuel L. Braunstein, quantum physicist, 1997–2004
- Ronald Brown was an English mathematician known for his work in algebraic topology
- Tony Conran, poet and translator, Reader in English and Tutor until 1983
- David Crystal, linguist and author, honorary professor of Linguistics
- A. H. Dodd, historian, 1919–1958
- Israel Dostrovsky (1918–2010), Ukrainian-born Israeli physical chemist, fifth president of the Weizmann Institute of Science
- Stephen Eichhorn, British materials scientist
- Malcolm Gavin, physicist and electronics engineer, developed the School of Engineering Science, 1955–1965
- John L. Harper, biologist, ecologist, British scholar and scientist, 1925–2009
- Raimund Karl, archaeologist, 2003–2020
- Christian Koller, historian, eighth director of the Swiss Social Archives, 2007–2014
- Bedwyr Lewis Jones, scholar
- William Mathias, composer, former professor of music
- Innes McCartney, British scientist
- John Morris-Jones, pioneering Welsh grammarian, editor, poet and literary critic
- Guto Puw, Welsh composer
- Duncan Tanner, historian of the Labour Party, 1989–2010
- Gwyn Thomas, Welsh scholar and poet
- John Meurig Thomas, Department of Chemistry
- Margaret Thrall, Welsh theologian and Anglican priest

=== Notable alumni ===
- Fahad Abdulrahman Badar, Qatari mountaineer and bankermanagement.
- Martin J. Ball, emeritus professor of linguistics at Bangor University, Cymru/Wales
- Frances Barber, actress
- Paul Bérenger, former prime minister of Mauritius
- Danny Boyle, film director and producer, graduated in English and drama
- Richard Brunstrom, Chief Constable of North Wales Police
- Gordon Conway, president of the Royal Geographical Society and vice Chancellor of the University of Sussex
- Dominic Chad, guitarist and pianist for Cheshire band Mansun
- Ann Clwyd, Labour MP for Cynon Valley
- Paul Alan Cox, ethnobotanist
- Colin Eaborn, chemist
- Aled Eames, maritime historian and warden of Neuadd Reichel in the 1950s and 1960s
- Robert G. Edwards, physiologist and pioneer in reproductive medicine won the 2010 Nobel Prize in Physiology or Medicine.
- John Evans, film director
- Bill Fay, singer/musician and recording artist
- Raymond Garlick, poet and editor
- Tony Gillam, musician and writer
- Mary Dilys Glynne, plant pathologist
- Gwynn ap Gwilym, poet
- Lowri Gwilym, television and radio producer
- Tim Haines, BBC producer
- Julian Hibberd, a plant scientist, was named by Nature as one of the "Five crop researchers who could change the world"
- Howel Harris Hughes, theologian, Presbyterian minister and Principal of the United Theological College, Aberystwyth.
- Siân James, traditional/folk singer and musician
- Einir Jones, poet
- Kathy Jones, Anglican priest and Dean of Bangor
- Denis Kwok, singer and actor; member of Hong Kong Cantopop group 'Error'
- Mmusi Maimane, South African politician
- Bethany C. Morrow, author
- Martha Elizabeth Newton, bryologist and cytologist
- John Ogwen, actor
- R. Williams Parry, poet
- Tom Parry Jones, scientist, and developer of the first handheld electronic breathalyser
- Stefan Rahmstorf, professor of Physics of the Oceans at Potsdam University
- Derek Ratcliffe, botanist, zoologist and nature conservationist
- Howard Riley, jazz pianist and composer
- Gareth Roberts, physicist and university administrator
- Kate Roberts, writer
- Andy Rowley, TV producer
- Aditi "Dot" Saigal, actress and musician
- John Sessions, actor
- Lyndon Smith, Professor in Computer Simulation and Machine Vision, University of the West of England
- Gwyn Thomas, poet and academic, National Poet of Wales
- R. S. Thomas, poet and Anglican priest
- Derick Thomson, Scottish Gaelic poet, publisher, academic and writer
- Tim Wheeler, Vice-Chancellor of the University of Chester
- Roger Whittaker, musician
- Bill Wiggin, Conservative MP for Leominster
- Gareth Williams, Secret Intelligence Service employee
- Ifor Williams, historian and editor of Welsh literature
- Herbert Wilson, a physicist who worked on the structure of DNA
- Hamza Yassin, TV presenter and wildlife cameraman. Zoology with conservation graduate

=== Fictional alumni ===
- The title character of Helen Fielding's 1996 novel Bridget Jones's Diary attended Bangor University.

== See also ==
- Armorial of UK universities
- List of universities in the United Kingdom
- List of universities in Wales
- List of forestry universities and colleges
