= Union Debating Society =

Union Debating Society or variations may refer to:

- Cambridge Union
- Debating and Political Society (Bangor University)
- Durham Union
- Manchester Debating Union
- Oxford Union
- University of St Andrews Union Debating Society
