= School of Health Sciences, Bangor University =

Health sciences school in Wales

Coordinates: 53.225249°N 4.135812°W

School of Health Sciences
- Ysgol Gwyddorau Iechyd
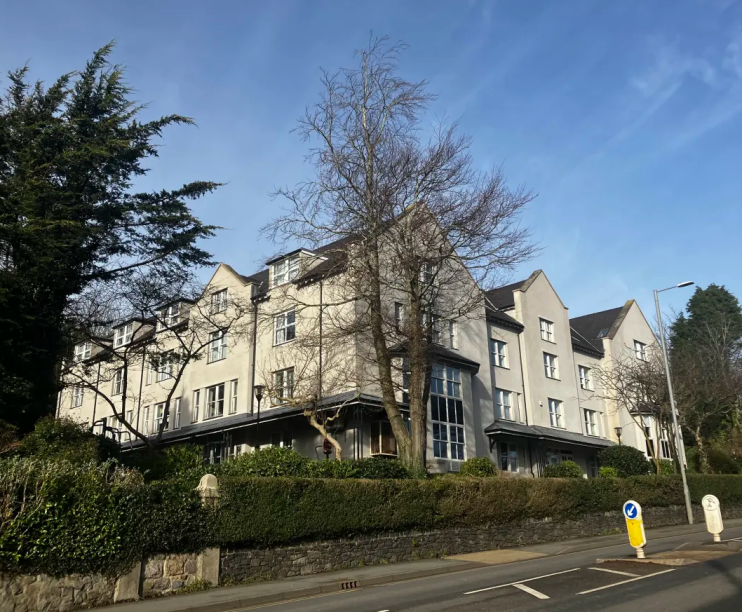
- Established: 1935 – Caernarvonshire and Anglesey School of Nursing; 1993 – Bangor University School of Nursing and Midwifery
- Parent institution: College of Medicine and Health, Bangor University
- Head of School: Professor Julie Green
- Total staff: 99
- Location: Bangor and Wrexham, Wales
- Campus: Multiple sites
- Colors: Purple
- Website: bangor.ac.uk/shs

The School of Health Sciences (Welsh: Ysgol Gwyddorau Iechyd) is the school of nursing, midwifery, and other allied health subjects at Bangor University. It is a part of the College of Medicine and Health. Founded as the Caernarvonshire and Anglesey School of Nursing in 1935, it went through various stages of reform until merging with the University College of North Wales (later Bangor University) in 1992.

The School offers undergraduate, postgraduate and research degrees as well as CPD courses for those entering or working in health and care-related professions.

== History ==
The Caernarvonshire and Anglesey Infirmary was first approved as a complete training school for nurses in 1935. In the 1960s, the infirmary matron Megan Willis began the development of a new nursing school with its own facilities. The new Gwynedd School of Nursing opened in 1969. By 1974, it had places for 48 registered nurses and 56 enrolled nurses.

In the 1990s, the Project 2000 review promised changes to the structure of nurse education to form a primarily graduate profession. As such, new mergers and developments took place across North Wales, forming a unified North Wales College of Nursing and Midwifery.

Shortly after the new college's formation, in 1992, the University College of North Wales proposed a merger. The college accepted, becoming the university's Faculty of Health Studies and the School of Nursing and Midwifery. A year later, in 1993, it also absorbed the small Wrexham-based North Wales College of Radiography.

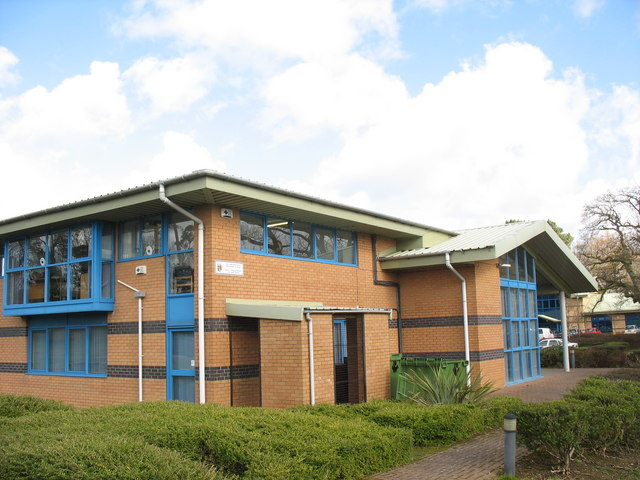
The Wrexham campus

Later, as UCNW reformed to become Bangor University, the school became known as the School of Healthcare Sciences. As more medical and clinical courses were taught at Bangor, and the establishment of North Wales Clinical School brought Cardiff University medical students to Bangor, it became known as the School of Medical and Health Sciences. The establishment of North Wales Medical School in 2023 moved medical teaching elsewhere, and the school took its current name.

In 2022, Paul Taylor was appointed as a mental health nursing lecturer, the first person with a learning disability to become a lecturer at a UK university.

=== In Wrexham ===
Unlike the Clwyd campus, Wrexham was retained as a teaching campus for the school. It moved in 1993 to the Wrexham Archimedes centre, along with several hospital administrative facilities. The former school was demolished in 1995 and replaced with new mental health wards, as the North Wales Hospital in Denbigh was closed.

== Campuses and buildings ==
The school operates on both of Bangor University's campuses, in Bangor and Wrexham. The Wrexham campus is dedicated to health sciences and is the base for the BSc Radiography course.

In Bangor, the school is based in Fron Heulog, which has clinical simulation facilities. It also uses other facilities used by the College of Medicine and Health, such as the Normal Site campus.

There is a dedicated hall in Friddoedd student village in Bangor for nursing and midwifery students.

== Academics ==
=== Research centres and chairs ===
The School has three research centres:

- Centre for Health Economics and Medicines Evaluation
- Centre for Mental Health and Society
- Dementia Services Development Centre

There is a single permanent Chair in Mental Health Research. Some professors have personal chairs or professorships.

There was previously also the Noreen Edwards Chair in Nursing Research.

=== Rankings ===
The school has consistently ranked highly in nursing, midwifery, and other allied health subjects. In 2025, it was ranked 1st for research and 3rd overall by the Complete University Guide for health and social care.

In the Research Excellence Framework 2021, 48% of research was considered world-leading and 47% internationally excellent. This placed it at 15th in the UK.

== Notable people ==
=== Principals of NWCNM ===
- Philip Pye (1991)

=== Heads of School ===
- Philip Pye (1991) (also Dean of Faculty)
- Professor Chris Burton
- Dr Lynne Williams (2021 - 2024)
- Professor Julie Green (2024 -)

=== Executive Heads of School ===
The school had both an executive head and head of school during the formation period of North Wales Medical School.

- Professor Mike Larvin (2021 - 2024)
