= Fahad Abdulrahman Badar =

Qatari mountaineer and banker (born 1979)

Fahad Badar
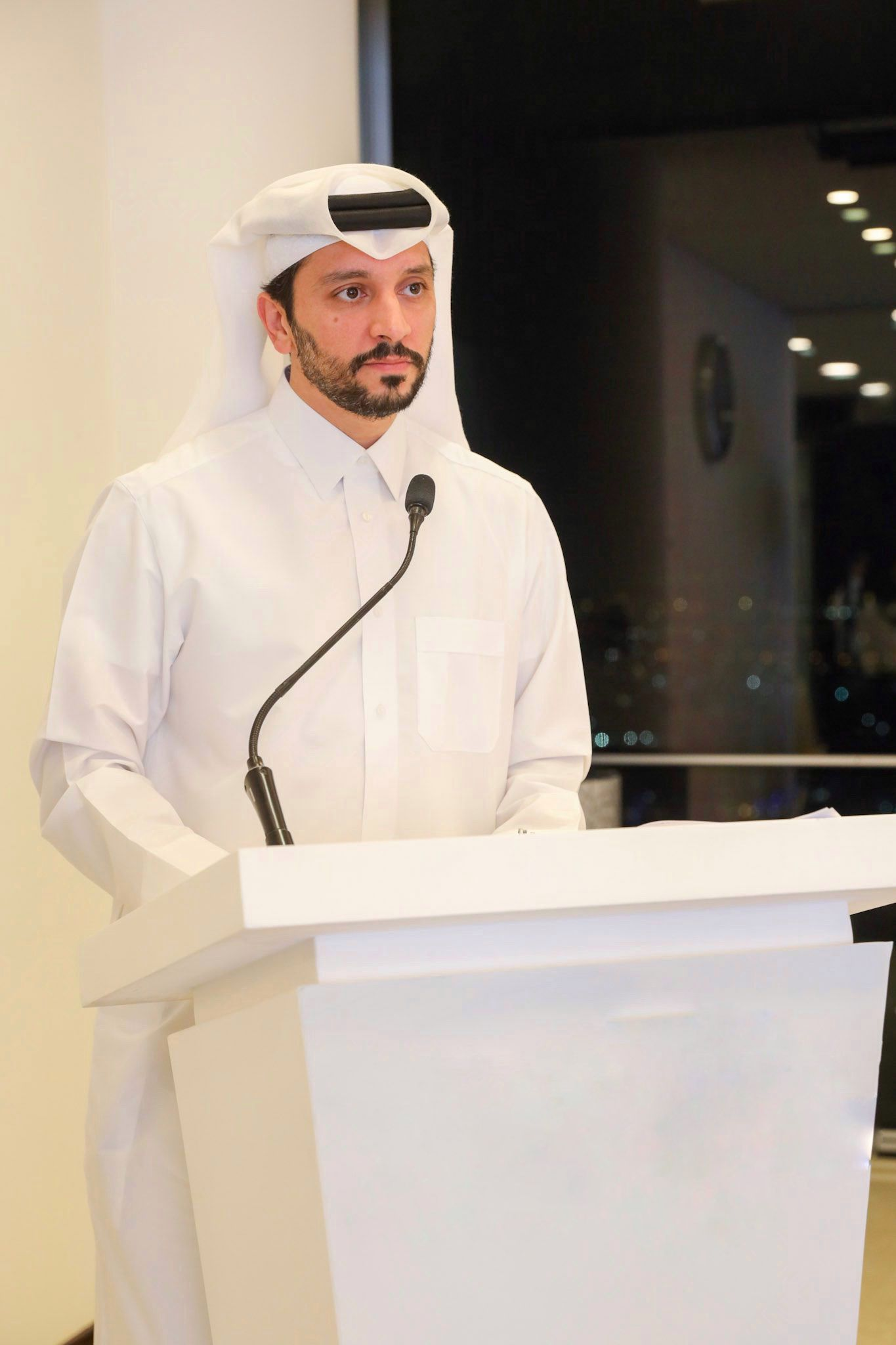
- Born: 1979 (age 46–47); Doha, Qatar
- Education: Bangor University; Durham University
- Occupations: Banker, Mountaineer
- Known for: First Qatari to summit Mount Everest and Lhotse in a single expedition
- Website: fahadbadar.com

Fahad Abdulrahman Badar (Arabic: فهد عبدالرحمن بادار) (born 1979) is a Qatari banker and mountaineer known for completing several high-altitude expeditions, including summits of Mount Everest and Lhotse in the same expedition, and first Qatari man to reach the summit of K2. He is one of the prominent figures in the development of high-altitude mountaineering within Qatar.

== Early life ==
Badar was born in 1979 in Doha, Qatar. He completed his early education in Qatar before moving to the United Kingdom for higher studies. Badar earned a bachelor’s degree in Banking and Finance from Bangor University in Wales. He later pursued postgraduate studies at Durham University, where he obtained a Master of Business Administration (MBA).

== Banking career ==
Badar is a veteran Qatari banker with more than two decades of experience in the Qatari banking sector. He spent the bulk of his career at Commercial Bank of Qatar where he held a series of senior roles across retail, operations, government & public sector relations, international and wholesale banking, and was later appointed Executive General Manager — Chief Wholesale & International Banking Officer. He has also served on the boards of regional banks including United Arab Bank and Alternatifbank, and is recognised for combining strategic management responsibilities with hands-on leadership of retail and international banking operations.

== Mountaineering career ==
Badar began pursuing high-altitude mountaineering in 2018, undertaking formal training while continuing his work in the banking sector. He has since completed expeditions to several major Himalayan and Karakoram peaks, including "Mount Everest", "Lhotse", and "K2", as documented in regional and international news reports. His climbing record includes both successful summits and significant setbacks; during an expedition to "Broad Peak", he sustained severe frostbite that later required partial amputation of several fingers.

== See also ==
- Nirmal Purja
- Mohammed bin Abdulla Al Thani
- Asma Al Thani
