= Hen Goleg, Bangor University =

University building in Bangor, Gwynedd, Wales

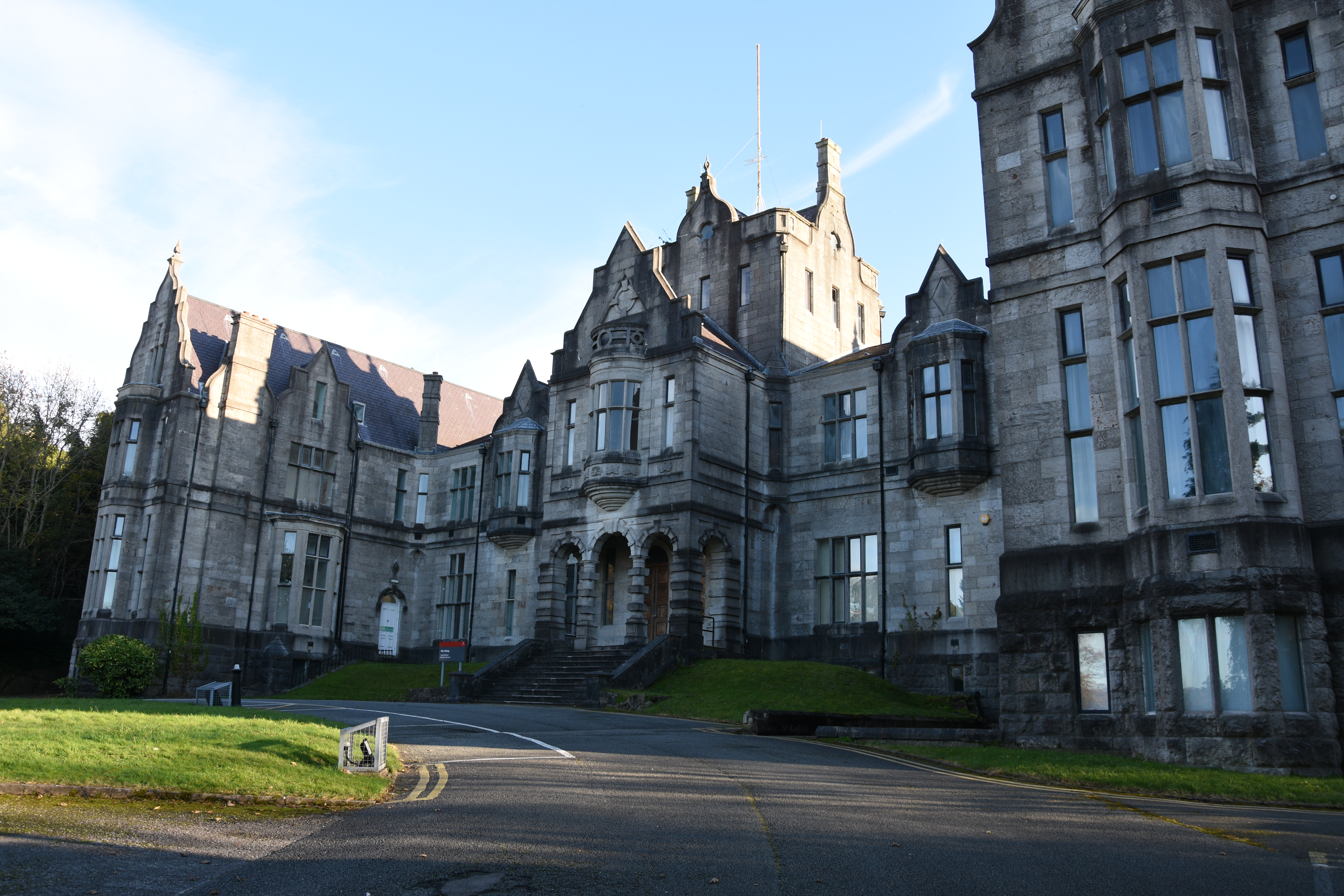
The building's coastal entrance

Hen Goleg (English: Old College) is a Grade II listed university building in Bangor, Gwynedd, Wales. It was built in 1858 in a Jacobean style, to house a teacher training school. Today, it is the location of Bangor Business School.

== History ==
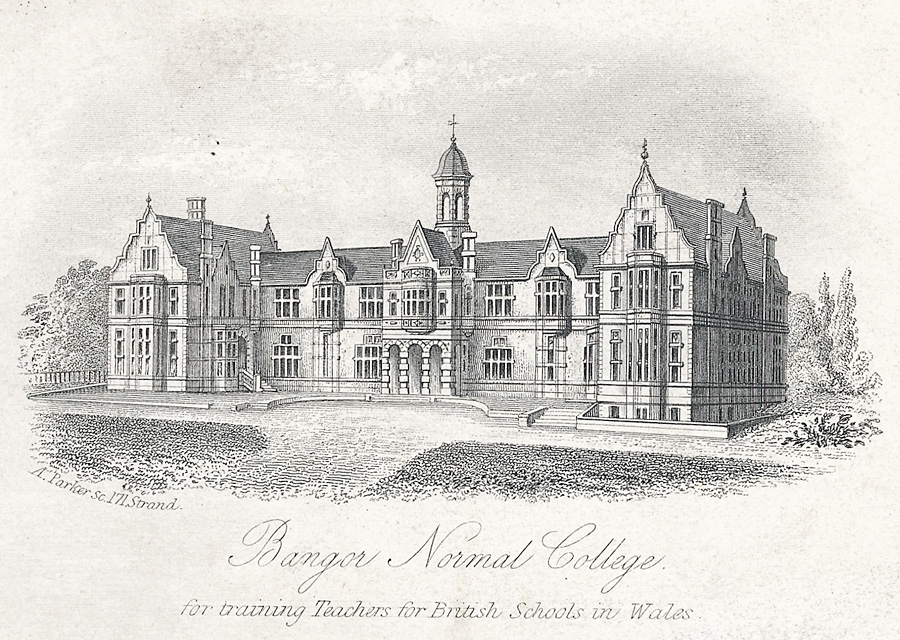
The original planned building

The Normal College, Bangor, was established in 1858 by the British and Foreign School Society. They hired the architect James Barnett to construct a building for the college, at a cost of £13,500 funded by local subscription. Construction began in 1865, taking two years.

It would later form part of the college's wider 'top college' site, as halls were constructed nearby (today known as the Management Centre).

== Architecture ==
The building is constructed in an E-shaped layout, with one side facing the coast and the other facing the Old Gymnassium building. It is constructed of ashlar stone.
