= Pontio, Bangor University =

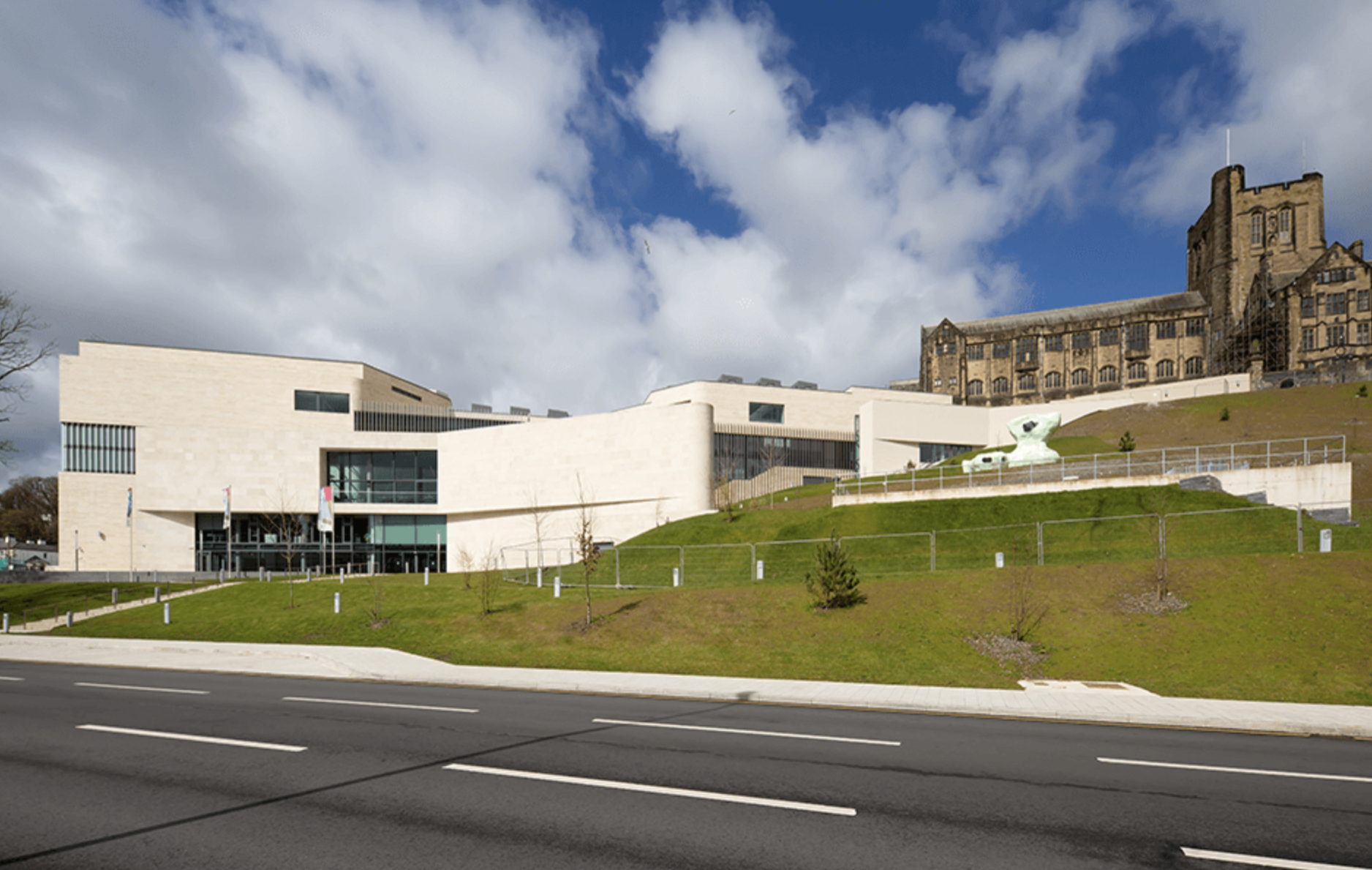
Pontio with Main Arts in the background

Pontio (English: to bridge) is a university building and arts centre located in Bangor, Gwynedd, Wales. It is operated by Bangor University. Opened in 2015, it houses community facilities, a cinema, and the university students' union.

== History ==
The centre was developed to replace the former Theatr Gwynedd and students' union buildings. Its construction was supported by Bangor University, the Welsh Government, the European Regional Development Fund, and the Arts Council of Wales. Originally planned to open in August 2014, various delays pushed back the opening by a year.

It sold 76,000 tickets in its first year. In 2019, it suffered a fire for which the building had to be evacuated.

In May 2024, an encampment was established on the lawn in front of Pontio as a demonstration against the conflict in Israel and Gaza. As of 2025, this has largely faded.

== Facilities ==
Pontio spans six levels, linking Deiniol Road in lower Bangor with Main Arts and College Road in Upper Bangor.

It has a 120-seat theatre and a 200-seat cinema. These are used as lecture facilities for the university during working hours.
