= Debating and Political Society (Bangor University) =

The Debating & Political Society
- Institution: Bangor University
- Location: Bangor, Gwynedd
- Established: 1849
- Colours: Red, White
- Website: www.undebbangor.com/groups/bangor-debating-political-society

The Debating and Political Society (Welsh: Cymdeithas Ddadlau a Gwleidyddiaeth) is a debating society at Bangor University. Founded in 1849, it is the oldest debating society in Wales. The society itself became a student society in 1884 upon the establishment of the University College of North Wales. A sister society would be later established at Bangor's Normal College in 1886 in connection with the University's society.

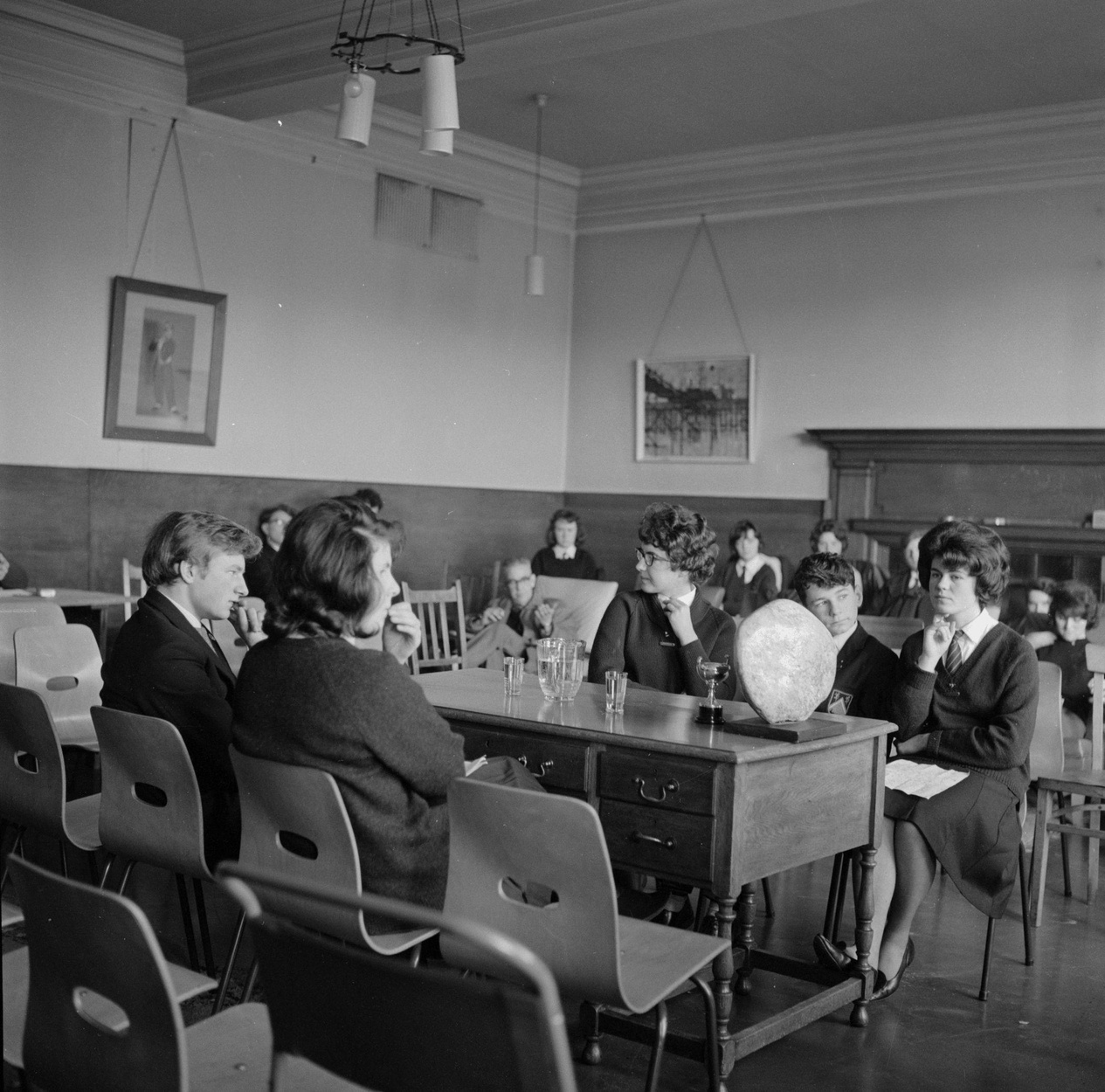
A schools debate on The Beatles at the society, 1964

In 2026, it received national publicity for banning Reform UK from speaking at its events. Undeb Bangor, the university's student union, distanced itself from the statement.

== Presidents ==
- 1911-1912: Leonard Owen
- 1945-46: Dafydd Gwilym Davies
- 1950: J. Gwynn Williams
