= Albert Gubay Business School =

Business school in Bangor, Wales

Coordinates: 53°13′46.2″N 4°07′51.3″W

The Albert Gubay Business School
- Ysgol Fusnes Albert Gubay
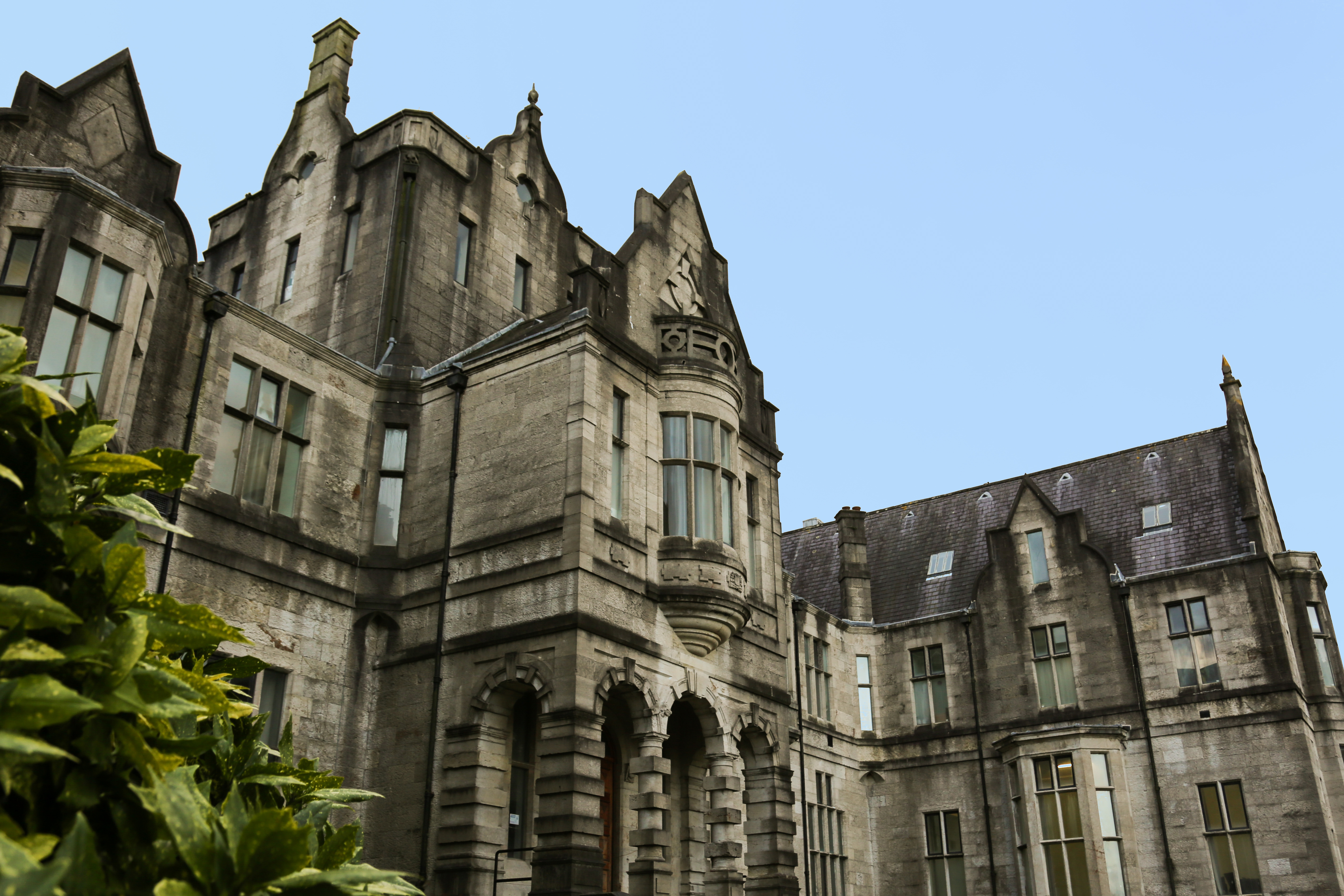
- Established: January 1, 1988
- Parent institution: College of Arts, Humanities and Social Sciences, Bangor University
- Accreditation: Chartered Banker Institute
- Head of School: Professor Bruce Vanstone (interim)
- Total staff: 35
- Location: Bangor, Gwynedd, Wales
- Campus: Urban
- Website: bangor.ac.uk/bbs

The Albert Gubay Business School is the school of business, accounting, and management at Bangor University. It is located in Bangor, Gwynedd, Wales. It is a part of the College of Arts, Humanities and Social Sciences.

It is currently located in Hen Goleg ("Old College"), the former site of Bangor Normal College. In 2025 it received a £10.5 million donation from the Albert Gubay Foundation, and will move to new premises.

== History ==
The school was established in 1998 as the School of Accounting, Banking and Finance. However, the school now offers a full suite of programmes in Accounting, Banking, Business, Data Analytics, Economics, Finance, Management and Tourism. It was later renamed to Bangor Business School, and expanded.

In 2025 the school received a £10.5 million donation from the Albert Gubay Foundation to fund expansion and a new site. The school thus took its current name.

== Academics ==
Rankings
National rankings
- Complete (2027): 67th (Accounting and finance), 37th (Business and management)
- Times / Sunday Times (2026): 54th (Accounting and finance), 43rd (Business and management)

Courses taught at the school include postgraduate degrees (MBA, Masters, and Research programmes) and undergraduate degrees (such as BSc Business and Management Studies).

It was the first business school in the UK to offer an MA in Banking and Finance, in 1973. It first offered an MBA program in 1991, with the University of Manchester.

The school is recognised as a centre of excellence by the Chartered Banker Institute.

The number of academic staff in the Business School has fallen in recent years, from 53 to 35.

The current Head of School is Professor Bruce Vanstone, who announced he was stepping down as Head of School on 27/10/2025. He stepped down as a result of falling student numbers.

=== Rankings ===
In The Complete University Guide 2025, the school ranked 67th out of 103 institutions for accounting and finance and 37th for business and management. Economics, Data Analytics and Tourism do not enter the Complete University Guide Rankings. It placed 43rd out of 134 UK universities in The Times Good University Guide 2024 for business and management and 54th for accounting and finance. Economics is one of six subjects in the university, and the only subject in the school, that is ranked in the QS World University Rankings.

In the Times Higher Education World Rankings 2026, the University was ranked 501-600th in the World in Business and Economics. It was ranked 401-500th in 2022. Measures of Research Quality, Industry and International Outlook have all risen since 2022.

The measures that have fallen since 2022 are Teaching and Research Environment.
