= Main Arts, Bangor University =

Grade I listed building of Bangor University, Wales

Coordinates: 53°13′44.14″N 4°7′46.87″W

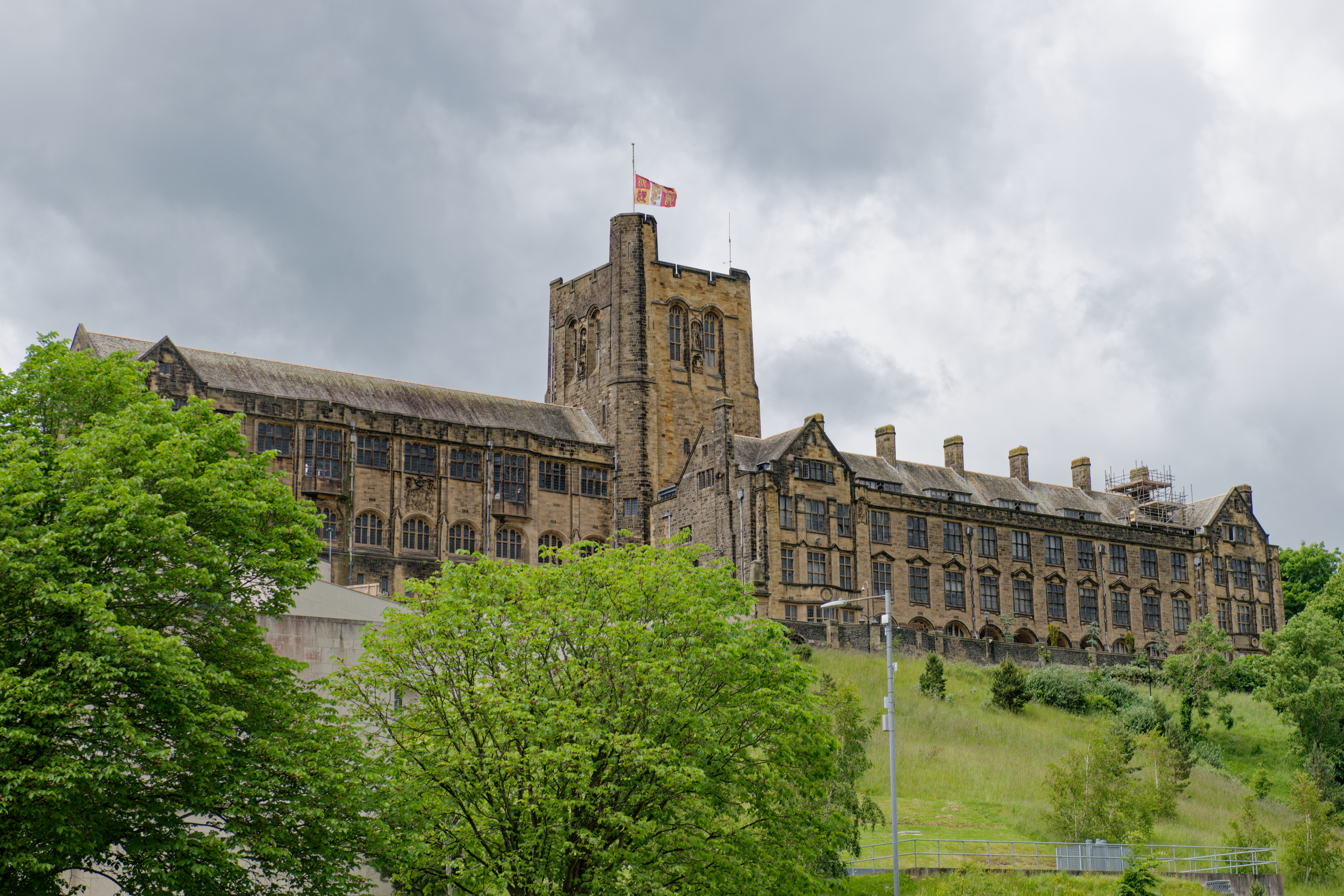
The southeastern side viewed from Deiniol Road

Main Arts is the central building of Bangor University in Bangor, Gwynedd, Wales. Described in its listing as 'perhaps the finest of all university buildings in Wales', it is a Grade I listed University building in the Collegiate Tudor style with Arts and Crafts influences. Designed by architect Henry Hare, it was completed in 1911.

Located in the centre of Bangor, the building dominates the views the city. Its highly visible location above the town meant that it became known, in Welsh as "Y Coleg ar y Bryn" (the College on the hill). The building contains the principal administrative areas of the university, in addition to the library, and the large Pritchard-Jones hall, named after Sir John Pritchard Jones.

== History ==
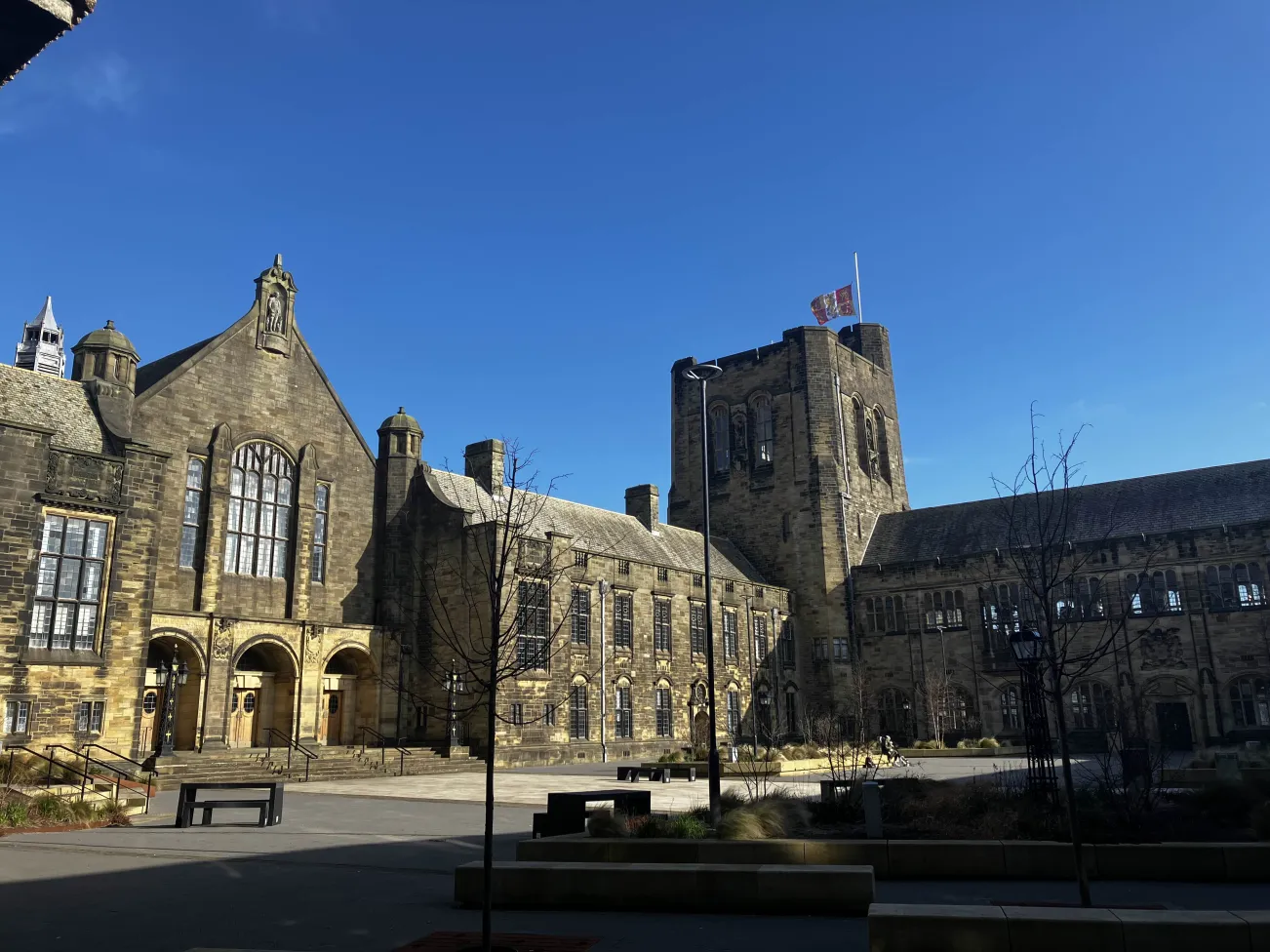
The outer quadrangle

When the University of North Wales was founded in 1884, it was initially based in a former coaching inn, the Penrhyn Arms hotel as there were less than 58 students and 12 teaching staff. As the university expanded however, a more significant base was required. After acquiring the current site from the city corporation in 1903, a competition was launched by the university. Designs were submitted from James Francis Doyle, Alexander Marshall Mackenzie, Arnold Mitchell, and the successful Henry Hare, whose design was selected by Sir Aston Webb.

University staff, most prominently Isambard Owen, modified the designs and the contractors used were Messrs Thornton & Sons from Liverpool. Construction began in 1907, its foundation stone was laid by King Edward VII. The total cost of the project was £175,000, and the building was formally opened in 1911 by King George V.

The competition of what would become the outer quadrangle was planned initially; but plans to raise funds were delayed by WW1. With Hare's death in 1921, these plans did not go ahead.

In 1949, the building was listed.

=== New Arts ===
In the 1960s, Sir Percy Thomas was contracted to complete the outer quadrangle, in a far more contemporary style than the original. The library extension, on the southwest side, was completed first in 1963. Five years later, in 1968, a teaching wing on the northwest side completed the quad. This new element of the building is known as New Arts.

== Architecture ==
The building is built around two quadrangles, the larger of which was left open initially but was later enclosed by the extensions built by Sir Percy Thomas between 1966 and 1970. The entire structure is linked together and focuses upon a central tower similar to that of a cathedral. The main courses are made from Cefn stone with freestone dressings and flat buttresses; and the slate roofs include a parapet and stone chimney stacks. Inside, the grandest room is the council chamber, decorated with Jacobean panelling, a vaulted ceiling, and the heraldry of the Welsh Princes. The same floor also contains the porcelain museum.

== Gallery ==
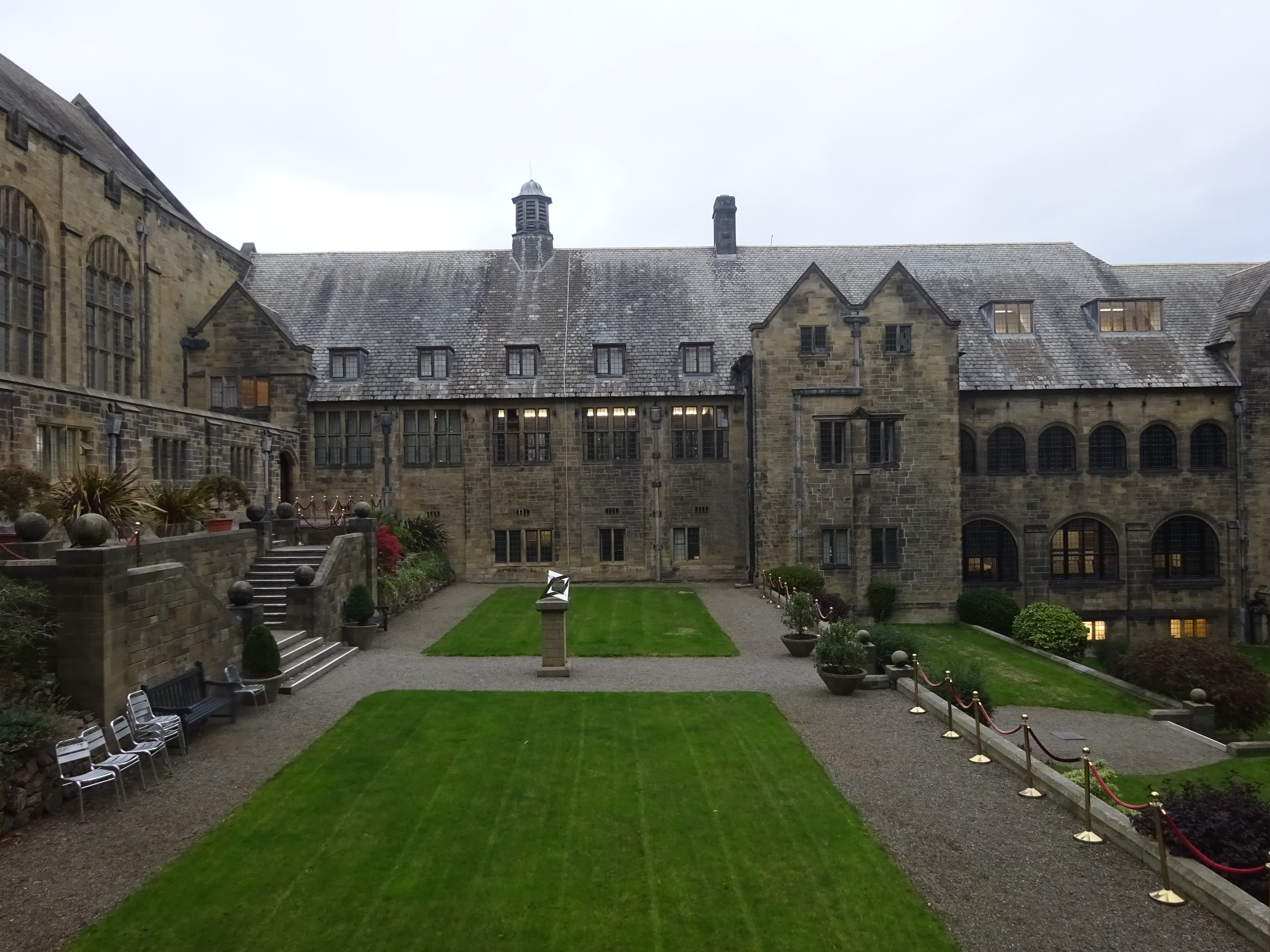
The inner quadrangle

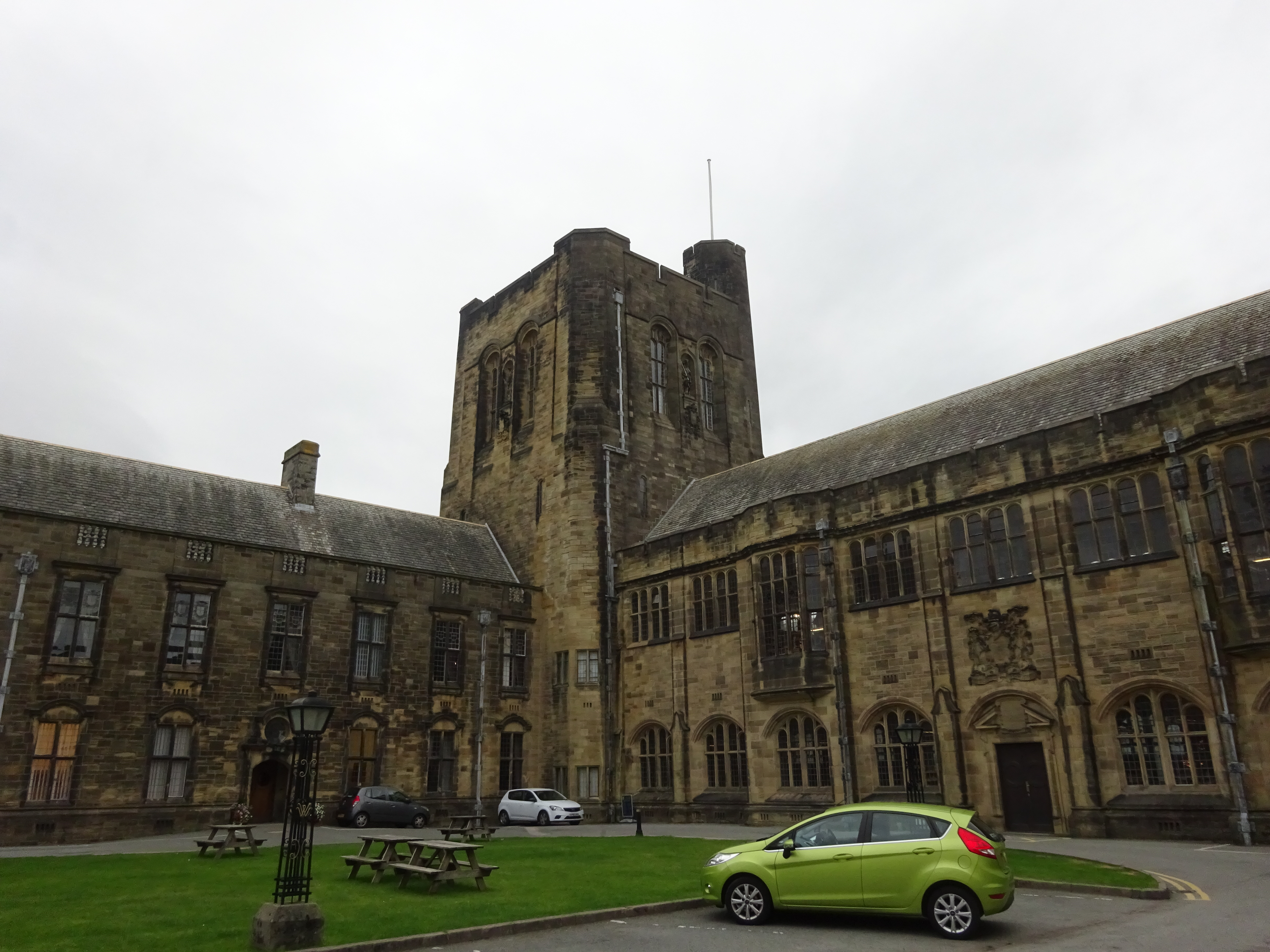
The central tower, before the redevelopment of the outer quadrangle

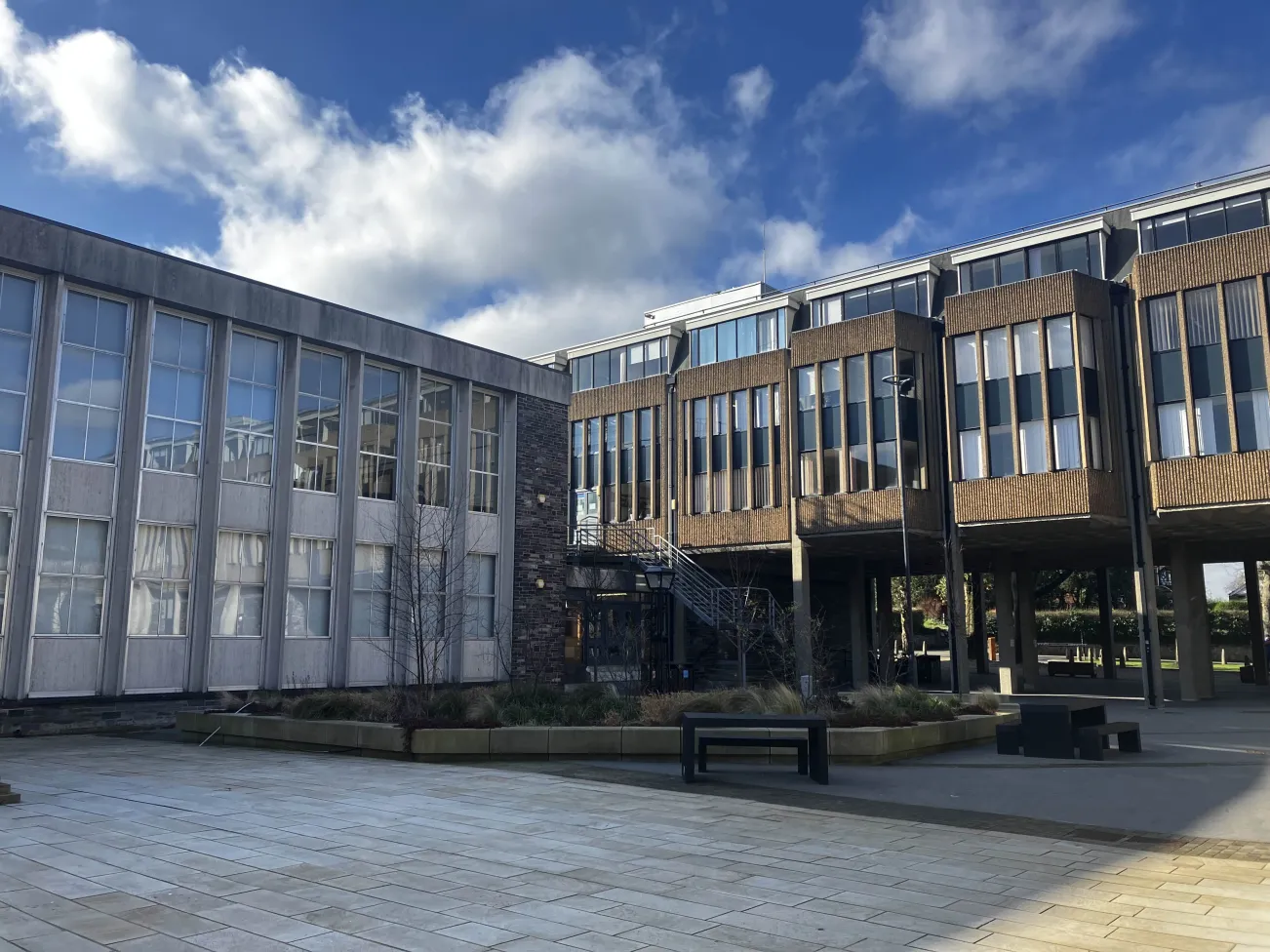
The New Arts half of the outer quadrangle
