= Tony Gillam =

British singer and writer (born 1961)

Tony Gillam (born 1961) is an English mental health nurse, writer and musician. A long-standing regular contributor to nursing and mental health journals, he has written more than 80 articles and two mental health related books, Reflections on Community Psychiatric Nursing (2002) and Creativity, Wellbeing and Mental Health Practice (2018). He founded the Music Workshop Project (which won a MIND Millennium Award in 1997, earning him lifetime membership of the Millennium Awards Fellowship). In 1998, he achieved international recognition as the only UK winner of the Lilly Schizophrenia Reintegration Award and, in 2008, was awarded a Meriden Carers’ Award and was highly commended in the Ian Falloon Memorial Awards for his work in the area of family interventions. He is a Senior Lecturer in Mental Health Nursing at the University of Wolverhampton, a trainer in Behavioural Family Therapy and a Visiting Lecturer at the University of Worcester.

== Personal life ==
Gillam was born in Shrewsbury, Shropshire, England. Alongside his career in mental health nursing, he is also a musician and singer-songwriter. In 2007, he released an album Untangle the Strings under his own name and has previously released two EPs recorded under the name Teach Yourself Shorthand. In 2013, he formed a duo with Phil Richards (cajon and harmonica), recording and performing as Fracture Zone. In 2018, Gillam released his first completely solo self-produced album Lazy Oceanography.

== Writing ==
Gillam has published numerous articles on nursing and mental health as well as two books on mental health nursing: Reflections on Community Psychiatric Nursing (2002) and Creativity, Wellbeing and Mental Health Practice (2018). He has also written widely on topics ranging from world music to children's literature. Writing for children as Anthony Gillam, he published a children's timeslip novel A Passenger in Time in 2009. His blog Passengers in Time purports to offer "adventures with books, music and time travel."

== Bibliography ==
- Gillam, T. (2002) Reflections on Community Psychiatric Nursing, London: Routledge. ISBN 978-0415259798
- Gillam, T. (2018) Creativity, Wellbeing and Mental Health Practice, Basingstoke: Palgrave Macmillan. ISBN 978-3319748832
- Gillam, A. (2009) A Passenger in Time, Brighton: Pen Press. ISBN 9781906710507

== Discography ==
- In the Emptiness
- Dizzy Heights EP by Teach Yourself Shorthand (2002)
- Supper in the Morning EP by Teach Yourself Shorthand (2004)
- Untangle the Strings (released by BiziB Music (2007)
- Lazy Oceanography by Tony Gillam (2018)
