= North Wales Medical School =

Medical school in Wales

Coordinates: 53°13′42.3″N 4°07′52″W

- Ysgol Feddygol Gogledd Cymru (Welsh)
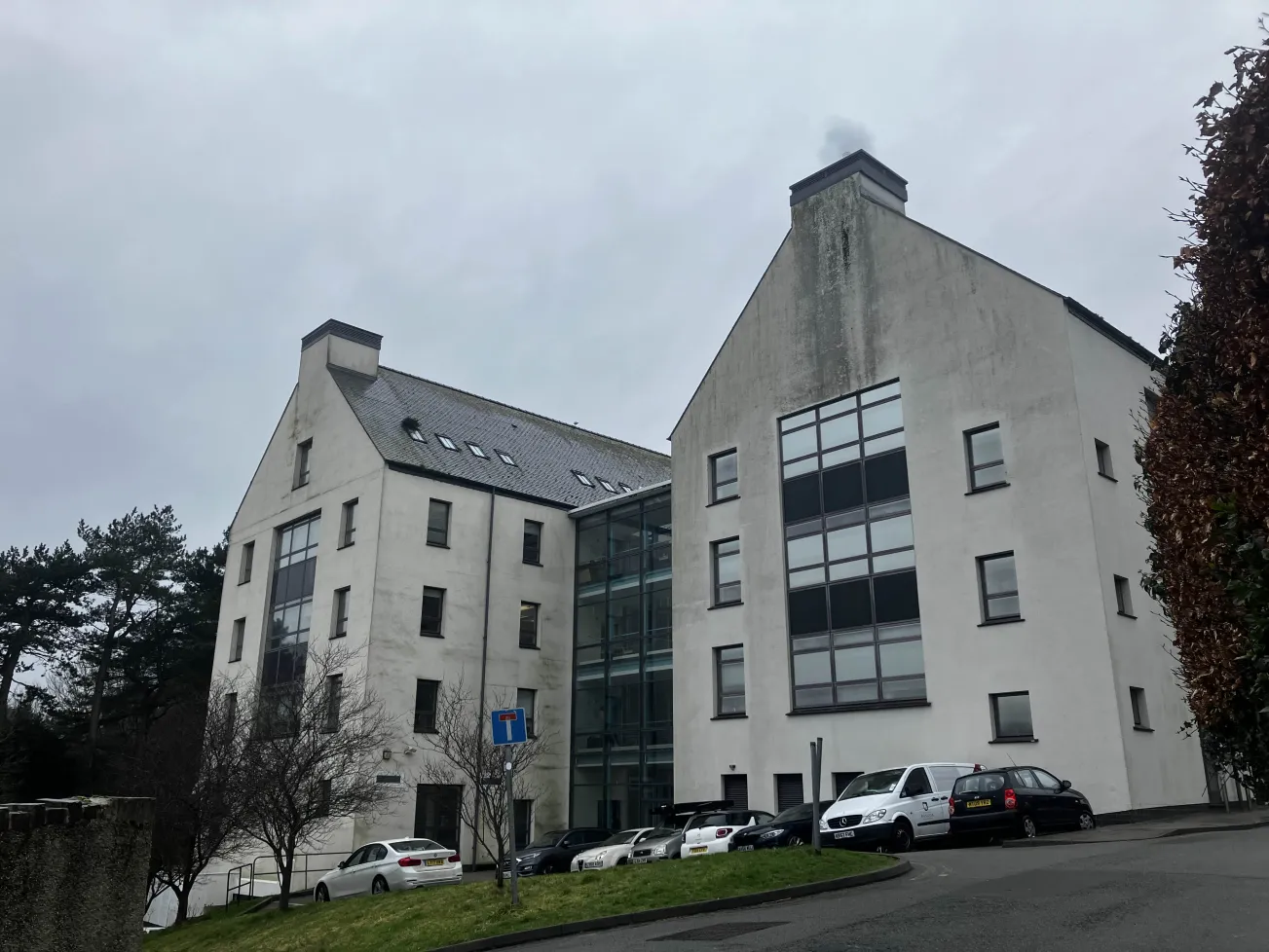
- Type: Medical school
- Established: September 2023; 3 years ago
- Affiliations: Bangor University
- Head of School: Stephen Doughty
- Location: Bangor, Gwynedd, Wales
- Campus: Single urban campus
- Language: English; Welsh
- Website: www.bangor.ac.uk/nwms

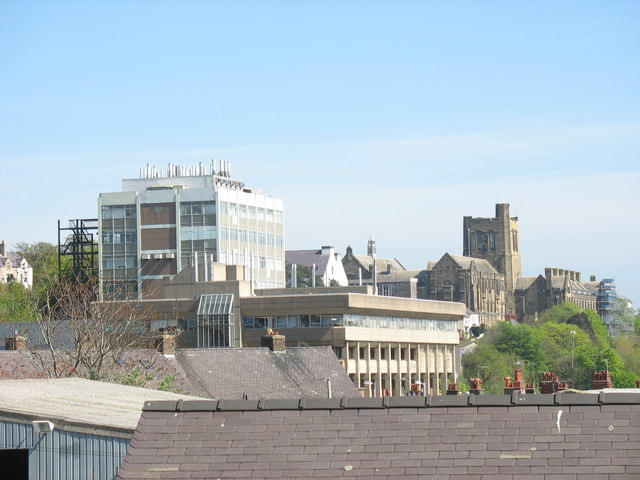
Bangor University from Bangor railway station

The North Wales Medical School (Welsh: Ysgol Feddygol Gogledd Cymru) is the school of medicine, pharmacy, and biomedical science at Bangor University in North Wales. It was formally established in 2023 following the reorganisation of the School of Medical and Health Sciences.

Originally known as the School of Medical Sciences, it merged with the School of Health Sciences in 2021 to form the School of Medical and Health Sciences. The making of the North Wales Medical School marked a significant step in the university’s expansion of healthcare education. The Biomedical Science programme, which has been running for over 20 years, is accredited by the Institute of Biomedical Science (IBMS) and continues to be a core part of the school’s academic offering.

The school delivered Years 2 to 5 of the C21 Medicine programme on behalf of Cardiff University under a franchise arrangement which began in 2018. In September 2021, the Welsh Government first proposed that a new, independent, North Wales medical school should be developed at the university, a commitment that was subsequently incorporated into the Programme for Government.

Health Minister Eluned Morgan established a North Wales Medical School Programme Board, which recommended that the school should grow to have an annual intake of 110 school-leavers and 30 graduate entrants, with the school commencing its first intake in Autumn 2024. In August 2023, the General Medical Council confirmed that the School would commence the quality monitoring process for new medical schools. The university recruited 80 applicants who commenced medical studies in September 2024. The intake will rise until the planned intake of 140 is reached in 2029. Both Direct Entry 5-year and Graduate Entry 4-year Medicine programmes are provided.

Student intake for Medicine commenced in September 2024, and Pharmacy will commence in September 2025 (subject to General Pharmaceutical Council approval).

== Overview ==
In 2004, the North Wales Clinical School was established jointly between the NHS in North Wales and Cardiff, Bangor University and NEWI. It had sites in Wrexham Maelor, Glan Clwyd and Ysbyty Gwynedd hospitals as well as sites at Bangor University. Initially the North Wales Clinical School provided support for 50 students in medical training in North Wales. As of 2011, the School had 150 students in North Wales at any given time.

In 2018, Cardiff University commenced their Community and Rural Education Route (CARER) option for Year 3 students at Bangor University.

In 2019, the Cardiff C21 North Wales 4-year Graduate Entry Medicine (GEM) programme commenced at Bangor University.

From August 2019, Cardiff Medical students who successfully completed Year 1 studies in Cardiff were able to apply to transfer to Bangor University for their final four years of study.

The C21 North Wales Medicine programme is delivered on behalf of Cardiff University, and is closely based on their C21 medicine programme except that all students undertake the Year 3 Community and Rural Education Route (CARER). The number of students was increased from 20 students for the 2020/21 academic year to 25 in 2021/22 and 40 in 2022/23. Student intake into the 2023-24 academic year was the final cohort to enter the C21 North Wales Medicine programme.

The first intake into the independent North Wales Medical School commenced in September 2024 with an entry cohort of 80 students, with Cardiff University acting as the contingency partner required by the GMC.

== Proposals ==
Plaid Cymru have called for a medical campus in north Wales since at least 2001, with Plaid Cymru assembly member and medical doctor, Dai Lloyd saying “We have had only one medical school, although a second campus in Swansea is becoming a reality. Our policy is to have a campus in Bangor too. We don't produce enough doctors. Ireland, with the same population, has six medical schools, and Scotland has five".

=== Initial rejection ===
In July 2017, the Welsh Labour government rejected calls for a North Wales medical school. Plaid Cymru assembly member Siân Gwenllian referred to this as a "betrayal of the people of Bangor, Arfon and all of the North". Professor Dean Williams of Bangor University said in May 2017 that the university was ready to establish a new medical school for the North. Instead the Welsh health secretary, Vaughan Gething said "A plan of education and training in north Wales through closer collaboration between Cardiff, Swansea and Bangor universities can ensure the increase in opportunities for medical education in north Wales." In response, Gwenllian said, "The need for a medical school in Bangor is clear, and the Welsh Government itself has recognised this [...] and tried to bury this blow to medical students and patients".

In September 2017 Plaid Cymru called for 40 medical student to be trained in North Wales if Bangor University collaborated with medical schools in the south. Rhun ap Iorwerth said that Plaid Cymru's ultimate goal was to form an independent medical school in Bangor, "Our proposals give us a way forward to achieving the goal of providing strong and sustainable hospital services across north Wales."

=== Existing plans ===
In 2020 the Welsh government had formed a research group to assess the feasibility of an independent medical school based at Bangor University. The concept of a medical school for North Wales received support from all major parties during the 2021 Senedd election.

In May 2021, Jo Whitehead, CEO of Betsi Cadwaladr University Health Board stated that the Board could support a new Medical and Health Sciences School in North Wales by 2025. Welsh Health Minister Vaughan Gething called a task and finish group together to assess whether a North Wales Medical School is “practical and achievable”. The group, chaired by Professor Elizabeth Treasure assessed the proposal from Autumn 2020 .

Siân Gwenllian of Plaid Cymru added, "I and Plaid Cymru have been campaigning on this issue for years, and it was an integral part of my re-election campaign in the Senedd elections." In 2017 Plaid Cymru secured a commitment from the previous Government to a budget to commence and now nearly 40 prospective doctors have been receiving part of their training at Bangor."

Welsh Health Minister Eluned Morgan stated in December 2022 that "Intake numbers for the Bangor medical school have been approved, and funding has also been approved for 140 students per year once the school reaches optimum capacity." Morgan added that a letter “of assurance was sent to General Medical Council colleagues in November" which would "allow Bangor University to continue their forward momentum through the accreditation process." Morgan also added on the prospect of ensuring that a proportion of students are Welsh speaking, "We are highly aware that we do need to be cognisant of how much recruitment there will be in terms of the numbers that are Welsh speaking … I know that a particular focus has been placed on that, with work currently being done in that area. So, I’m pleased to say that that is something that they are taking seriously."

The first cohort of 17 C21 North Wales medical students to have completed their studies entirely in North Wales graduated from Cardiff University in July 2023, and a second cohort of 12 students graduated in July 2024.

=== Confirmation ===
From September 2024, Bangor University has offered its own independent Medicine programme with the support of the Welsh Government, subject to GMC approval and quality monitoring processes. Bangor University provides both a 5-year school entry course and a 4-year graduate entry course. Cardiff University is acting as the contingency guarantor as required by the GMC. Students will be able to study most of the elements of the course in Welsh as well as in English.

The new North Wales Medical School will largely follow the current Cardiff University C21 North Wales programme, adapted to meet the learning opportunities and needs of the mixed rural and urban areas in the region, embracing the Welsh language and local culture.

The Welsh government will fund up to 140 students per annum and a there will be a gradual increase in the number of students trained until reaching a total capacity of 670 students by 2033. This will allow time to assess and evaluate the quality of teaching and student experience. The North Wales Medical School will be established in a partnership between the Welsh Government, Bangor University, Cardiff University, Betsi Cadwaladr University Health Board GPs and primary care health providers.

In August 2023, the General Medical Council confirmed the school was on target to meet its quality standards. The university admitted 80 medical students in its September 2024 intake.

=== Purpose ===
A primary goal of the establishment of the medical school is to address the recruitment of medical staff in North Wales. The number of general practitioners (GP) has increased slightly over Wales but attracting doctors to work in North Wales has traditionally been more of a challenge. Currently, there are more than 28 vacant full-time GP posts which are being filled by locum staff.

== Secondary school engagement in North Wales ==
Since 2016, doctors at Glan Clwyd Hospital and Ysbyty Gwynedd have guided Year 12 and 13 pupils in local state schools with their Medicine and Dentistry applications. In 2023 40 students participated in the Seren Medics programme with Glan Clwyd Hospital, and the programme has been expanded to Gwynedd and Flint.

== See also ==
- Medical education in Wales
