= Maurice Griffith =

The Right Reverend Maurice Griffith
- Bishop of Rochester
- Church: Roman Catholic
- Diocese: Diocese of Rochester
- In office: 1554–1558
- Predecessor: John Scory
- Successor: Edmund Allen

Orders
- Consecration: 1 April 1554 by Edmund Bonner

Personal details
- Born: c. 1507 near Caernarfon
- Died: 20 November 1558 Southwark, London, England

Maurice Griffith (or Griffin; c. 1507 – 20 November 1558) was a Welshman who became Bishop of Rochester.

== Biography ==
Little is known of his birth but it is thought to have been in the Caernarfon area around 1507. He was a friar at Blackfriars, Oxford and was admitted as B.D. on 5 July 1532. In 1535 was appointed by John Hilsey, then Bishop of Rochester, to be his Vicar-General, and was appointed rector of St Magnus-the-Martyr in 1537. A succession of posts in the church followed, mainly in the Diocese of Rochester but he also maintained his Welsh connection with the see of St. Asaph. Only towards the end of his career, in 1554, was he appointed to be Bishop of Rochester.

=== Necrography ===
He died on 20 November 1558, probably at the bishop's palace in Southwark, and was interred in the church of St Magnus-the-Martyr, of which was still rector at the time of his death, on 30 November 1558 with much solemnity. In accordance with the Catholic church's desire to restore ecclesiastical pageantry in England, the funeral was a splendid affair, ending in a magnificent dinner. The three leading mourners were Sir William Petre, Sir William Garrard and Simon Lowe, who were also to be the executors of his will. Both Gerrard and Lowe were parishioners of his at St Magnus-the-Martyr. He had been left, with William Glyn, Bishop of Bangor, property from the will of Geoffrey Glyn, in order to found a school in Bangor in North Wales. As William Glyn had also died and he was the only surviving trustee of Glyn's will, he transmitted this trust by his will to his executors – William Petre, William Garrard and Simon Lowe – who went on to found Friars School, Bangor as was intended.

Catholic Church titles
Preceded by John Scory	Bishop of Rochester; 1554–1558	Succeeded by Edmund Allen
