= Heneglwys =

Coordinates: 53.258°N 4.367°W

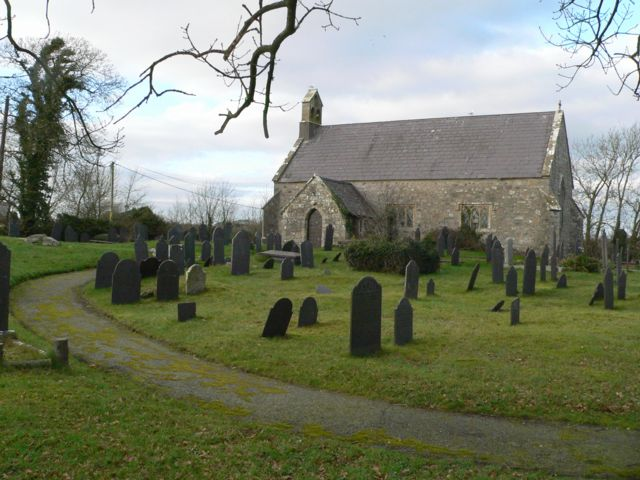

- Location within Anglesey
- Principal area: Anglesey
- Preserved county: Gwynedd
- Country: Wales
- Sovereign state: United Kingdom
- Police: North Wales
- Fire: North Wales
- Ambulance: Welsh
- UK Parliament: Ynys Môn
- Senedd Cymru – Welsh Parliament: Bangor Conwy Môn

Heneglwys (meaning 'Old Church') is a village in Anglesey, in north-west Wales. St Llwydian's Church is of 12th century origin. It is in the community of Bodffordd, and until 1984 was its own community.

== Notable people ==
- Geoffrey Glyn (died 1557), lawyer, founded Friars School, Bangor.
- William Glyn (1504–1558), Bishop of Bangor, 1555/8.
