= Lois Medi =

Lois Medi Wiliam also known as Lois Medi (born c. 2002) is a Welsh poet who in 2024 and 2026 won the Chair at the Urdd National Eisteddfod, the first woman to win twice.

== Early life ==
Wiliam is from Penrhosgarnedd in Bangor Gwynedd. She was a pupil at Ysgol Tryfan and Ysgol David Hughes. She graduated in Social Anthropology at the London School of Economics in 2024.

== Poetry ==
In 2023 (as Lois Medi William) she won the D. Gwyn Evans Trophy, awarded by the Barddas magazine for the best poem by a person aged between 16 and 25. Wiliam came to prominence when she won the Urdd Chair, the main poetry prize, at the 2024 Urdd National Eisteddfod in Montgomeryshire. Her winning poem, on the theme of Gwrthryfelwr ('Rebel') was written in memory of her grandfather. The judges said Wiliam "manages to convey longing and sadness in a mature way without piling on adjectives and without creating sentimental images."

In May 2025 Wiliam won the Chair at the Trevelin Eisteddfod in Patagonia, where she was living and working to promote the Welsh language. On the theme of Yr Alwad ('The Call'), her winning entry was inspired by a visit to the Los Alerces National Park.

In May 2026 at the Anglesey Urdd National Eisteddfod Wiliam (as Lois Medi) won the Chair for a second time, the first woman ever to do so. The theme of the entries was Pont ('Bridge') and her winning poem explored the bridge between real life and the world of technology.

== Patagonia ==
After graduating, Medi moved to Patagonia, living and working in the town of Gaiman. She directed a women's choir and later became a Welsh language teacher at Gaiman School.
