= Penrhosgarnedd =

Suburb of Bangor, Gwynedd, Wales

Coordinates: 53.210537°N 4.163096°W

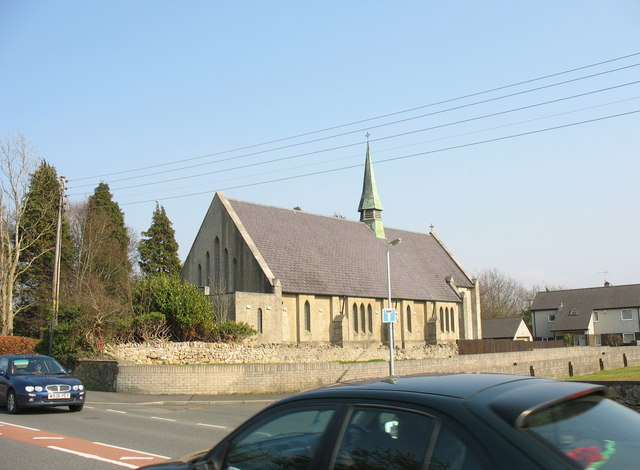
- St Peters Church, Penrhosgarnedd

- Location within Gwynedd
- Population: 2,450 (2021 Census)
- Principal area: Gwynedd
- Preserved county: Gwynedd
- Country: Wales
- Sovereign state: United Kingdom
- Post town: BANGOR
- Postcode district: LL57
- Dialling code: 01248
- Police: North Wales
- Fire: North Wales
- Ambulance: Welsh
- UK Parliament: Bangor Aberconwy
- Senedd Cymru – Welsh Parliament: Arfon

Penrhosgarnedd is a suburb of Bangor in Gwynedd, North West Wales. It lies roughly 2 miles (3.2 km) southwest of the city centre. Historically a distinct village, it has since been largely integrated into the city's urban area.

== History ==
The area has prehistoric origins, evidenced by several archaeological sites. Notable features include the Goetre-uchaf barrow, a Bronze Age burial mound and scheduled monument (Ref: CN 376), and a group of prehistoric barrows near Penrhos Road.

In the 19th and 20th centuries, Penrhosgarnedd transitioned from rural farmland to a residential hub. Much of the current development, including residential estates and key infrastructure, took place from the 1930s onwards.

Penrhosgarnedd falls within the administrative community of Pentir, which recorded a total population of 2,450 at the 2021 Census.

== St Peters Church ==
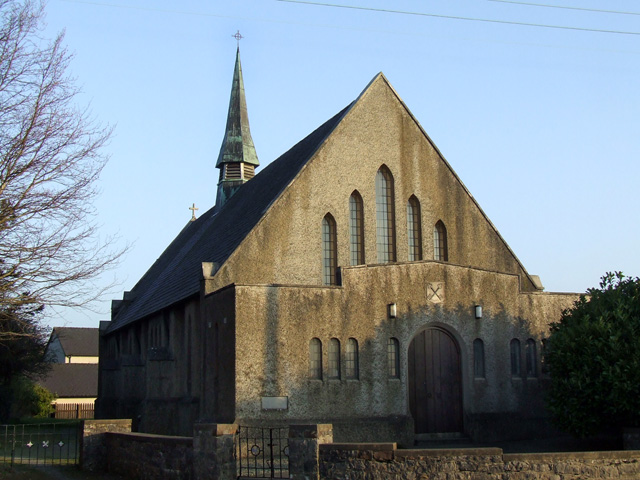
St Peters Church, the Church in Wales parish church of Penrhosgarnedd

The church of St Peters was built in 1956, replacing an earlier one built in 1895. The church was designed by architect P. M. Padmore. Its design is noted for a "severe lancet style" and shows the clear influence of Herbert North, a prominent Arts and Crafts architect active in North Wales.

It was built during a period of residential expansion in Penrhosgarnedd to serve the growing suburban population south-west of Bangor city centre.

In 2013, amid a wider reorganisation of Anglican worship in Bangor, St Peter's was one of the churches chosen to remain open. As part of this reorganisation, the Diocese of Bangor recommended that St Peter's focus on establishing and maintaining a Welsh-medium congregation to serve the local community.

A 2019 survey of the building highlighted its well-maintained interior, including a notable chancel ceiling. The church is part of the Bro Deiniol Ministry Area (formerly the Bro Eryri Ministry Area) and is a member of the Church in Wales.

== Amenities ==
Penrhosgarnedd is a key healthcare and education hub for Northwest Wales:

- Healthcare: Ysbyty Gwynedd, the region's main district general hospital, opened here in May 1984, replacing the older Caernarfon and Anglesey Infirmary.
- Education: Local schools include Ysgol y Faenol, a Church in Wales primary school, and the Welsh-medium primary Ysgol y Garnedd.
- Worship: The area contains several places of worship, including St Peter's Church and the Beulah (Congregational) and Capel y Graig (Welsh Calvinistic Methodist) chapels.

== Geography ==
The suburb is located on elevated ground southwest of the city, bounded to the south by the A55 road (North Wales Expressway).

== Transport ==
The suburb is served by the A487 road and Penrhos Road, providing access to Bangor and the A55. It is on major bus routes, including the TrawsCymru T2 service. Bangor railway station is the nearest active railway station and provides services along the North Wales Main Line.

The area was also historically served by both Menai Bridge and Treborth railway station on both the North Wales Main Line and the former Bangor and Carnarvon Railway. However, both of these stations closed in the 1960s.

== Notable residents ==
- Baron Goronwy-Roberts (Goronwy Roberts): Former MP and Labour politician.
- Lois Medi, Welsh language poet, grew up in Penrhosgarnedd
- Aled Jones: The singer and broadcaster, known for "Walking in the Air", was born in Bangor and raised in Penrhosgarnedd.
