= Caernarvonshire and Anglesey Infirmary =

Former hospital in Bangor, Wales

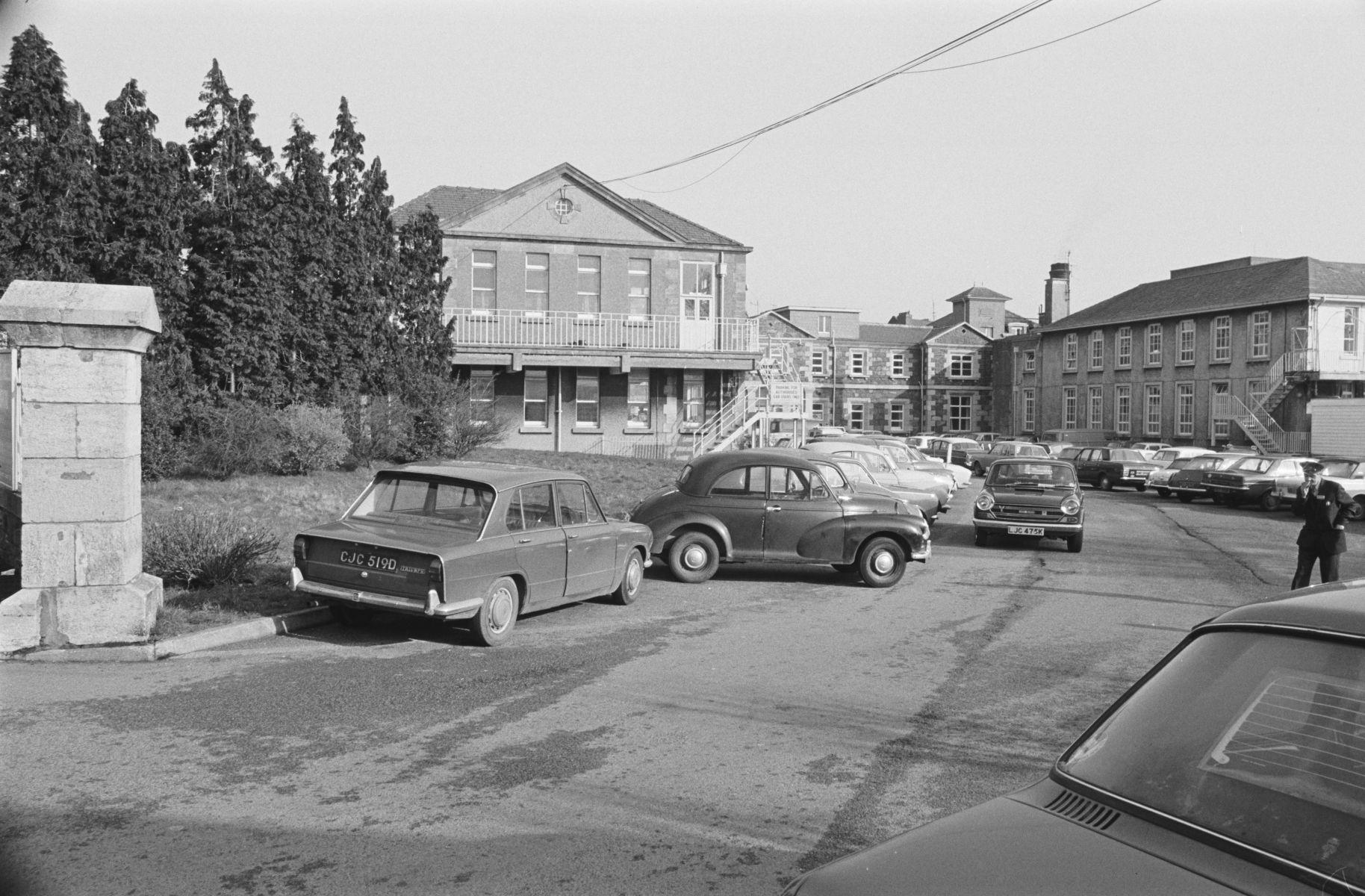

Geography
- Location: Holyhead Road, Bangor, Gwynedd, Wales

Services
- Beds: 786 (in 1926)

History
- Opened: 1809 (as the C&A Loyal Dispensary); 1845 (as the C&A Infirmary)
- Closed: 1984

The Caernarvonshire and Anglesey Infirmary, commonly known as the C&A, was a general hospital in Bangor, Wales.

It was first established in 1809 and demolished in 1984, replaced by the new Ysbyty Gwynedd on a different site.

== History ==
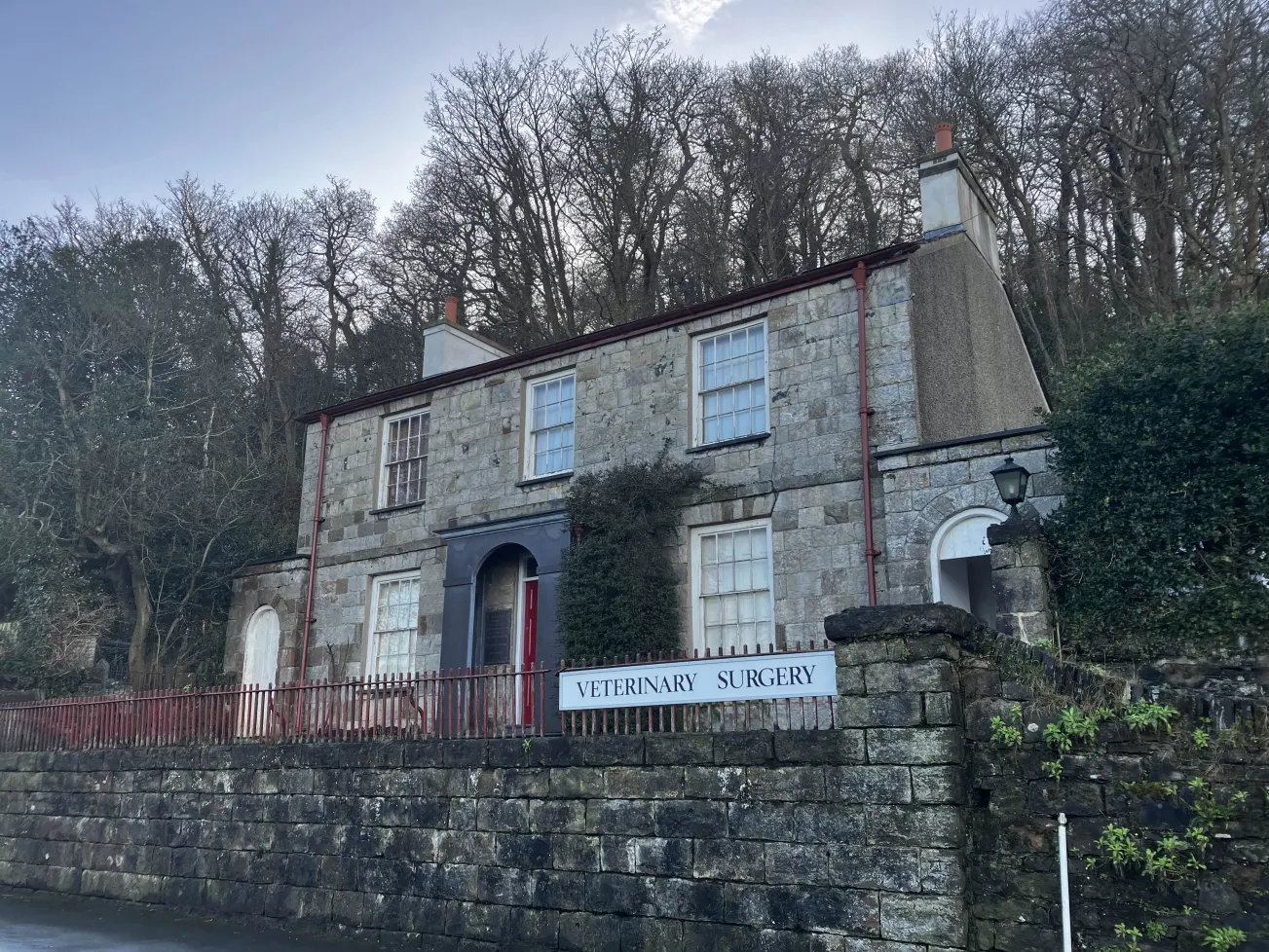
The original dispensary building, now a veterinary surgery

The hospital was first established as the Carnarvonshire and Anglesey Loyal Dispensary in 1809, to commemorate the 15th anniversary of George III's reign. It initially had only a small building intended to help provide smallpox vaccinations, but in 1845 moved to a much larger site in Upper Bangor, funded by subscription from local gentry. The previous site was turned into previous accommodation and is now a veterinary surgery. Despite the move, the now renamed Infirmary remained a small hospital, having only 11 beds in 1882.

It expanded greatly throughout the early 1900s, going from 149 beds in 1901 to 786 beds in 1926. Construction on a new wing as well as interior modernisation began in 1923, finishing three years later and increasing the bed capacity by 300.

It became a nurse training school in 1935.

The site was closed in 1984 as the new Ysbyty Gwynedd hospital opened in Penrhosgarnedd. It was ultimately demolished and replaced with what is now a Morrison's supermarket.
