= Arfon (district) =

Former district of Gwynedd, Wales

Coordinates: 53°05′N 4°00′W

- District with borough status
- History
  - Created: 1 April 1974
  - Abolished: 31 March 1996
  - Succeeded by: Gwynedd
  - HQ: Bangor
- Contained within
  - County Council: Gwynedd

Arfon was a local government district, with borough status, in north-west Wales from 1974 to 1996; it was one of five districts in the then larger county of Gwynedd.

== Etymology ==
Arfon means 'opposite Anglesey' (Ar + Fôn which is the soft mutation of Môn, the Welsh name for Anglesey). The name is ancient and has been used to designate the area since early medieval times. In the Middle Ages Cantref Arfon was an administrative territorial entity of the Kingdom of Gwynedd. Arfon survived as a geocultural name (Welsh: bro) over the centuries and remains in use today. It is also sometimes found as a personal name (e.g. Arfon Griffiths).

== History ==
The borough was created on 1 April 1974, under the Local Government Act 1972. It covered the whole area of four former districts and most of a fifth from the administrative county of Caernarfonshire, which were all abolished at the same time:

- Bangor Municipal Borough
- Bethesda Urban District
- Caernarfon Municipal Borough
- Gwyrfai Rural District, except the parishes of Beddgelert and Clynnog which went to Dwyfor
- Ogwen Rural District

Under the 1972 legislation the district was referred to as 'Gwynedd District 3', with the merging councils invited to suggest names. The Secretary of State for Wales had the power to make the final decision. Bangor City Council, Bethesda Urban District Council and Ogwen Rural District Council favoured 'Nant Ffrancon'. Caernarvon Borough Council suggested 'Arfon' or 'Eryri' and Gwyrfai Rural District Council also supported 'Arfon'. Peter Thomas, the Secretary of State, chose Arfon as 'the most appropriate'. The new district was named Arfon by statutory instrument. An order in council authorised the granting of a charter conferring borough status.

Under the Local Government (Wales) Act 1994, the previous two tier system of counties and districts was replaced with new principal areas (each designated either a "county" or a "county borough"), whose councils perform the functions previously divided between the county and district councils. The Arfon area merged with Dwyfor and Meirionnydd to become a county which the government initially called "Caernarfonshire and Merionethshire". During the transition to the new system, the shadow authority requested a change of name from "Caernarfonshire and Merionethshire" to "Gwynedd". The government confirmed the change with effect from 2 April 1996, one day after the new council came into being.

== Political control ==
The first election to the council was held in 1973, initially operating as a shadow authority alongside the outgoing authorities until it came into its powers on 1 April 1974. The council consisted of 40 district councillors elected from 33 electoral wards. From 1987 this reduced to 39 councillors and 31 wards. Political control of the council from 1974 until its abolition in 1996 was as follows:

Party in control	Years
Independent	1974–1979
No overall control	1979–1996

== Premises ==
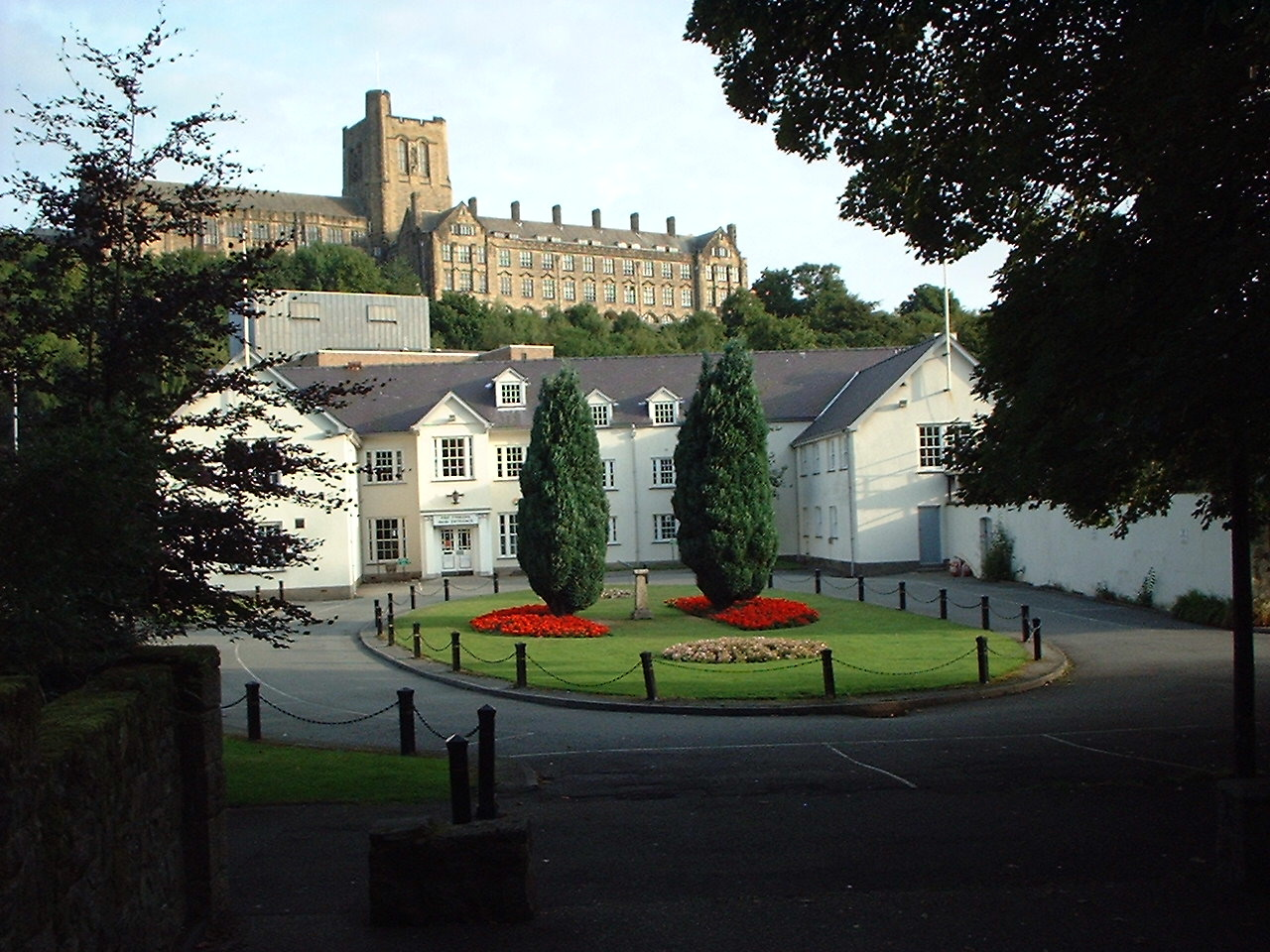
Town Hall, Bangor (with Bangor University on the hill behind it), c. 2003

Arfon Borough Council was based at the Town Hall, Ffordd Gwynedd, Bangor. This was the former Bishop's Palace of the Bishop of Bangor, dating back to around 1500. The building ceased to be used as the bishop's residence in 1900, and was bought by the former Bangor City Council in 1903, who converted it to become their headquarters. The building was renamed "Town Hall" (despite Bangor being a city) in 1908. After Arfon Borough Council's abolition in 1996 the Town Hall was used as an area office of Gwynedd Council before being converted to become the Storiel museum and art gallery, which opened in 2016.
