= William Glyn (bishop) =

Welsh Catholic bishop (1504–1558)

- Bishop of Bangor
- Church: Roman Catholic
- Appointed: 21 June 1555
- Term ended: 1558
- Predecessor: Arthur Bulkeley
- Successor: Maurice Clenock

Orders
- Ordination: 8 September 1555 by Edmund Bonner

Personal details
- Born: 1504 Heneglwys, Anglesey
- Died: 21 May 1558 (aged 53–54)

William Glyn (1504 – 21 May 1558), also known as William Glynn or William Glynne, was the Bishop of Bangor from 1555 until his death.

He was born in Heneglwys, Anglesey and educated at Queens' College, Cambridge, later becoming a fellow of that college and of Trinity. He was elected president of Queens' College in 1553, vice-chancellor of Cambridge University in the following year, and Bishop of Bangor in 1555.

He had been pragmatic towards the religious changes of the Reformation but probably remained most sympathetic to Catholicism.

His brother Geoffrey Glyn had left property and money in his will in 1557 towards the founding of a grammar school in Bangor, which William Glyn and Maurice Griffith, Bishop of Rochester were intended to execute. Both these men were to die the following year before the intention could be executed, but ultimately Friars School, Bangor was set up.

Academic offices
| Preceded by William May | President of Queens' College, Cambridge; 1553–1557 | Succeeded by Thomas Pecocke |
