= Edmund Allen (priest) =

English clergyman and scholar

- Bishop of Rochester
- Church: Church of England
- Diocese: Diocese of Rochester
- Elected: 1559
- Installed: never
- Term ended: 1559 (death)
- Predecessor: Maurice Griffith
- Successor: Edmund Gheast

Personal details
- Born: c. 1519 Norfolk, England
- Died: 1559
- Buried: 30 August 1559, St Thomas Apostle, London
- Denomination: Anglican
- Education: Corpus Christi College, Cambridge

Edmund Allen (or Edmond, or Alen, or Edmonde Aellen; c. 1519 – 1559) was an English clergyman and scholar.

A native of Norfolk, England, Allen was elected fellow of Corpus Christi College, Cambridge in 1536. He became steward of Corpus in 1539, and not long after obtained leave of the society to go and study abroad. He became, according to John Strype, a great proficient in the Ancient Greek and Latin tongues, an eminent divine, and a learned minister of the gospel. He was in exile during the reign of Mary I; but Elizabeth I, on coming to the crown, appointed him one of her chaplains, gave him a commission to act under her as an ambassador, and promoted him to the see of Rochester, which however he did not live to fill. It is said he was buried in the church of St. Thomas Apostle, in London, 30 August 1559.

He translated into English De Authoritate Verbi Dei by Alexander Ales and in 1543 works of Philip Melanchthon while he was abroad. He also wrote A Christian Introduction for Youth.

Church of England titles
Preceded by Maurice Griffith	Bishop of Rochester; 1559	Succeeded by Edmund Gheast
