= Simon Lowe alias Fyfield =

Member of the Parliament of England

Simon Lowe, alias Fyfield (alive by 1522, died 1578), was a rich English merchant tailor in the City of London, and also a landowner in several counties, briefly one of the members of the House of Commons of England representing two boroughs in other parts of England.

Lowe owned property on London Bridge from 1536 and lived there in 1576. He was Warden of the Merchant Taylors' Company for the year 1549-50, and was a Member (MP) of the Parliament of England for Stafford in October 1553 and New Shoreham in November 1554.

He was Master of the Merchant Taylors' Company during the reign of Queen Mary and one of the jurors who acquitted Sir Nicholas Throckmorton in 1554: the court had been openly hostile to Throckmorton, and as a result of the unexpected verdict it fined and imprisoned the jury. He was a mourner at the funeral of Maurice Griffith, Bishop of Rochester and Rector of St Magnus-the-Martyr, when Griffith was interred in the church on 30 November 1558 with much solemnity. With Sir William Petre and Sir William Garrard he was an executor of Maurice Griffith's will and, in consequence of this, played a part as an initial trustee in the founding of Friars School, Bangor.

Lowe was included in a return of recusants in the Diocese of Rochester in 1577, but was still buried at St Magnus-the-Martyr on 6 February 1578. Stow refers to his monument in the church.

== Family ==
Simon Lowe had married Margaret Lacy, a daughter of Christopher Lacy (died 1518) of Brearley, Yorkshire, by 1550.They had several children including:

- Timothy Lowe, eldest son (died 1617), was educated at Christ Church, Oxford, and was knighted at the Coronation of King James on 23 July 1603.
- Alderman Sir Thomas Lowe, second son (1550–1623), was Master of the Haberdashers' Company on several occasions, Sheriff of London in 1595/96, Lord Mayor of London in 1604/05, and a Member of Parliament for London.
- Blessed John Lowe, youngest son (1553–1586), having originally been a Protestant minister, converted to Roman Catholicism, studied for the priesthood at Douay and Rome and returned to London as a missionary priest. His absence had already been noted; a list of 1581 of "such persons of the Diocese of London as have any children ... beyond the seas" records "John Low son to Margaret Low of the Bridge, absent without licence four years". Having gained 500 converts to the Church of Rome between 1583 and 1586, he was arrested while walking with his mother near London Bridge, committed to the Clink, and executed at Tyburn on 8 October 1586. He was beatified in 1987 as one of the eighty-five martyrs of England and Wales.
- Anne Lowe, their daughter who married John Aldersley of Spurstow Hall. Their daughter Elizabeth became Baroness Coventry by her 2nd marriage.
