= Bangor Town Hall =

Building in Bangor, Gwynedd, Wales

- Neuadd y Dref Bangor (Welsh)
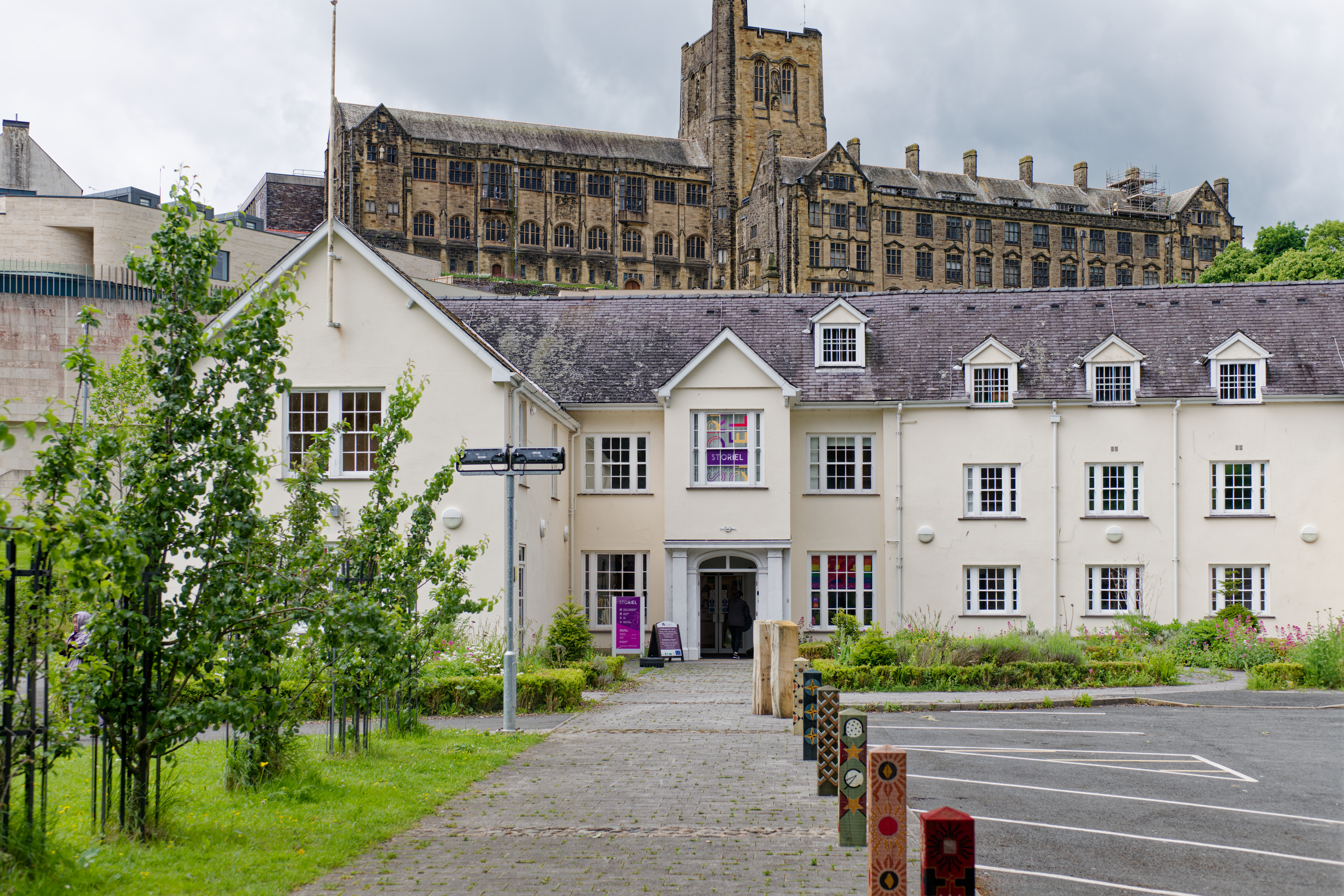
- Bangor Town Hall (with the administration building of Bangor University in the background)

- Shown in Gwynedd
- 53.2274°N 4.1285°W
- Location: Ffordd Deiniol, Bangor

History
- Built: c.1546

Site notes
- Architectural style: Vernacular style

Listed Building – Grade II
- Official name: Town Hall
- Designated: 27 May 1949
- Reference no.: 3951

Bangor Town Hall (Welsh: Neuadd y Dref Bangor), formerly The Bishop's Palace (Welsh: Plas yr Esgob), is a municipal building on Ffordd Deiniol, in Bangor, Gwynedd, Wales. The structure, which is now used as a museum, is a Grade II listed building.

== History ==
=== Bishop's Palace ===
The building was commissioned by the Bishop of Bangor, probably Arthur Bulkeley, as his residence and was completed in around 1546. The original design involved the right-hand part of the present central block, facing south towards Bangor Cathedral, and the east wing, which was projected forward. It was considerably extended at the request of the then-bishop, Henry William Majendie, creating a west wing, the left-hand part of the present central block and additions at the rear of the central block in 1810. The central wing then comprised six bays with a two-storey jettied and gabled porch in the second bay from the left. The other bays were fenestrated by tri-partite sash windows on both floors. The four bays on the right also contained dormer windows at attic level. The ends of the wings, which were projected forward as pavilions, were fenestrated with bi-partite sash windows on both floors. A slate plaque was installed reading: "Dominus Gulielimus Episcopus Aedificavit AD - 1810" (English: The home of Bishop William erected in the year of our lord 1810). The building ceased to be used as the bishop's residence in 1900.

=== Town Hall ===
After the borough council was reformed under the Municipal Corporations Act 1883, the new civic leaders decided to acquire the building and to convert it for use as its headquarters in 1903. The building was renamed "Town Hall" (despite Bangor being a city) in 1908. Internally, the principal new room established was the council chamber, which featured a vaulted ceiling, on the first floor. It continued to serve as the local municipal headquarters when Arfon District Council was formed in 1974, but ceased to be the local seat of government when the enlarged Gwynedd Council was formed in 1996, which is based in Caernarfon. However, it continued to be used as an area office of Gwynedd Council until 2013.

=== Storiel Museum ===
In March 2014, an extensive programme of refurbishment works costing £2.6 million was initiated, with support from the National Lottery Heritage Fund, to convert the building into a museum.

The Gwynedd Museum and Art Gallery, which had been located in The Canonry in Tan-y-Fynwent, relocated to the former Town Hall, which re-opened as the Storiel (a portmanteau formed from the Welsh words stori (story) and oriel (gallery)) on 30 January 2016. The collection, which includes items assembled by Bangor University since it first opened in 1884, features a Roman artefact known as the "Segontium Sword", found at the Roman fort of Segontium.
