= St Llwydian's Church, Heneglwys =

Church in Heneglwys, Anglesey, Wales

Coordinates: 53.2586°N 4.3665°W

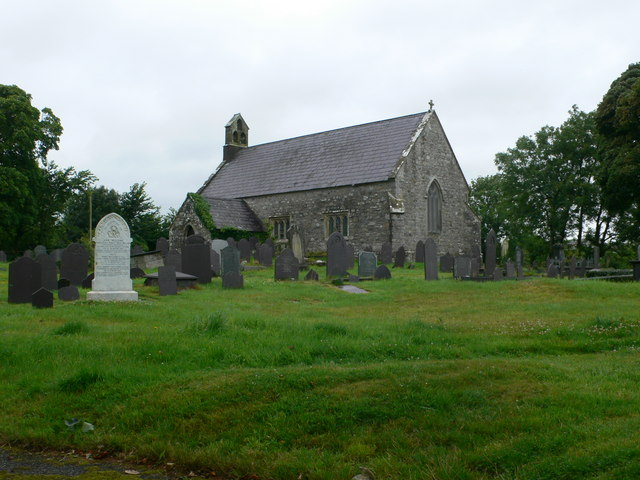
St Llwydian's Church, Heneglwys

St Llwydian's Church is a Grade II listed church in Heneglwys, Anglesey, Wales. The building dates to 1845, though it was erected using material from an earlier church. The circular font is as old as the 12th century, and the Church in Wales notes that an "unusually high number of 12th century stones" used in the church's construction indicate that the original church stemmed from that period. The doorway in the north wall is of 14th-century origin; the two windows with cinquefoil lights, of the 15th century.
