= St Thomas the Apostle, London =

Coordinates: 51°30′42.9582″N 0°5′35.0448″W

St Thomas the Apostle
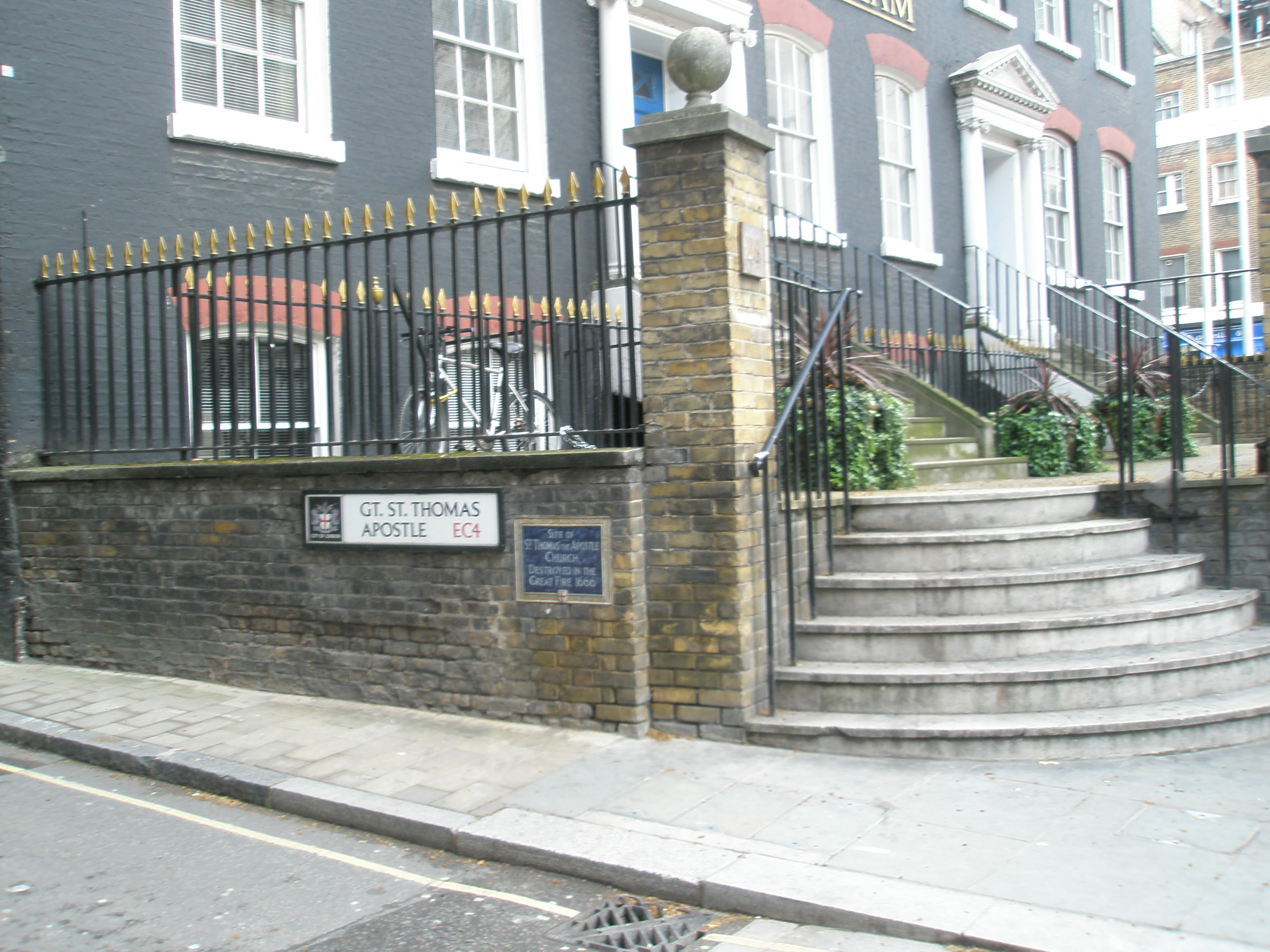
- Plaque marking the site of the church
- St Thomas the Apostle
- Location: London
- Country: England
- Denomination: Anglican

History
- Founded: 12th century

Architecture
- Demolished: 1666

St Thomas the Apostle was a parish church in St Thomas Apostle Street in the City of London. In existence by the late twelfth century, it was destroyed in the Great Fire of London in 1666 and not rebuilt.

== History ==
The patronage of the church belonged to the canons of St Paul's and it is mentioned in the register of the Dean and Chapter as early as 1181. John Stow implies that it was rebuilt some time in the late fourteenth century, describing John Barnes, Lord Mayor in 1371, as "a great builder of S. Thomas Apostles parish church as appeareth by his armes there both in stone and glasse".

The parish was staunchly Royalist in the years leading up to the Civil War. In 1642, the rector, named Cooper, was sequestered and imprisoned in Leeds Castle owing to his loyalty to the king.

St Thomas's was destroyed by the Great Fire in 1666. Following the Fire, a Rebuilding Act was passed and a committee set up under Sir Christopher Wren to decide which buildings would be rebuilt. Fifty-one were chosen, but St Thomas the Apostle was not among those. Instead, the parish was united with that of St Mary Aldermary. Part of the site was used for the creation of Queen Street, though a small portion of the churchyard survived.

The site of the church is marked by a plaque in Great St Thomas Apostle Street, near Mansion House tube station.

Edmund Allen (died 1559), Bishop of Rochester, is said to have been buried in the church.
