= Thomas John Thomas =

Welsh footballer (1877–?)

Thomas Thomas
Personal information
- Full name: Thomas John Thomas
- Date of birth: 1877
- Place of birth: Wales

International career
Years	Team	Apps	(Gls)
1898	Wales	2	(1)

Thomas John Thomas OBE (born 1877) was a Welsh footballer. He was part of the Wales national team, playing two matches. He played his first match on 19 February 1898 against Ireland and his last match on 19 March 1898 against Scotland.

He studied at the Friars School, Bangor.

He became an Officer of the Order of the British Empire. He was ranked colonel of the Australian Army during World War I and had as post being finance member of the Australian Military Board in October 1920. He received the OBE (selected) Australian War Honour that year.

== See also ==
- List of Wales international footballers (alphabetical)
