= Ysgol Tryfan =

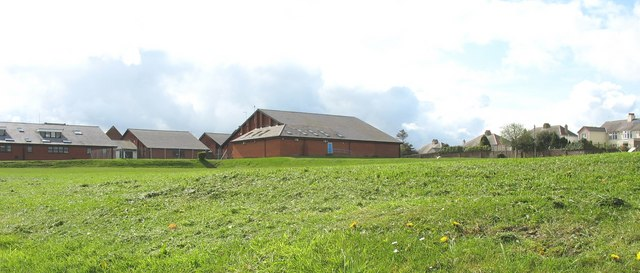

Location
- Lôn Powys; Bangor, Gwynedd, LL57 2TU; Wales; 53°13′13″N 4°08′42″W

Information
- Former name: Bangor Grammar School for Girls
- Type: Comprehensive
- Motto: Cefnogi, ysbrydoli - yn deulu (Supporting, inspiring – a family)
- Established: 1978; 48 years ago
- Local authority: Gwynedd
- Head teacher: Dr Geraint Owen Jones
- Age: 11 to 18
- Enrolment: 534 (2024)
- Language: Welsh Bilingual (Type A)
- Budget: £6187 per pupil (2024)
- Standards Group (1-5): 1
- Website: www.ysgoltryfan.org

Ysgol Tryfan is a bilingual comprehensive school for pupils aged 11–18, situated in Bangor, Gwynedd. In 2024, 534 pupils were enrolled at the school, including 76 in the sixth form.

The majority of pupils live in Bangor, with a large proportion coming from the surrounding towns and villages, including Llanfairfechan, Bethesda, Y Felinheli and Menai Bridge. The school shares the same catchment area of primary schools as Ysgol Friars. On average, around 34% of pupils from primary schools situated in Bangor transfer to Ysgol Tryfan.

Welsh is the school's administrative and official language. According to the latest Estyn inspection report carried out in 2019, 64% of pupils come from Welsh-speaking homes. As of 2015, 72% of pupils aged 11–15 were fluent in Welsh. According to the Welsh Government, Ysgol Tryfan was ranked 47th out of 207 in 2019.

== History ==
The school was established on the site of the former County School for Girls in 1978 as a Welsh-medium comprehensive school in Bangor. The school is located on the earlier site of the Grammar School for Girls in the Maes Tryfan area, not far from Penrhosgarnedd, and about a mile from the city centre.

In 1971, three secondary schools merged: Ysgol Friars, the County School for girls (another grammar school), and Ysgol Deiniol (a secondary modern school). At first the school used all three sites: the former girls' school site was used for the Welsh-language stream for junior years, and the old Friars building for the English-language stream for senior years. The senior years came together in new buildings constructed for £300,000 on the new site. 1978 saw a further reorganisation:. the Welsh-medium stream was separated out to form a new school for 11-18-year-olds, Ysgol Tryfan, on the present Lôn Powys site.

== Notable former pupils ==
- Gwenllian Lansdown - Former Chief Executive of Plaid Cymru and current Chief Executive of Mudiad Meithrin.
- Robin McBryde - rugby international and Wales forwards coach.
- Lois Medi, poet
- Owain Tudur Jones - footballer.
- Lisa Jên - actress and singer with the Welsh language folk band 9Bach.
