= Geoffrey Glyn =

Welsh lawyer

Geoffrey Glyn (died 1557), also known as Geoffrey Glynne, was a lawyer, principally known as the founder of Friars School, Bangor.

He was born in Heneglwys, Anglesey, the brother or half-brother of William Glyn, later Bishop of Bangor. A graduate of Trinity Hall, Cambridge, he qualified as LL. B. in 1535 and LL. D. in 1539, and was an advocate at the Court of the Arches. He died at the ‘Arches in London’ (i.e. St Mary-le-Bow) in July 1557. In his will, dated 8 July and proved on 21st, he left the Friar House in Bangor, properties in Southwark and elsewhere, and £420 in cash towards the founding of the school which became Friars School.
