= Ysgol Friars =

Location
- Lôn y Bryn; Bangor, Gwynedd, LL57 2LN; Wales; 53°13′04″N 4°09′07″W

Information
- Type: Comprehensive
- Motto: Foedere Fraterno or 'On with the brotherhood'
- Established: 1557; 469 years ago
- Founder: Geoffrey Glyn
- Head teacher: Margaret Davies
- Gender: Mixed
- Age: 11 to 18
- Enrolment: 1383 (2025)
- Language: English with significant Welsh
- Houses: Deiniol, Enlli, Cybi and Seiriol
- Colours: Black, yellow and white
- Alumni: Old Dominicans
- Standards Group (1-5): 2
- Website: www.ysgolfriars.cymru

Ysgol Friars (Welsh for 'Friars School') is a school in Bangor, Gwynedd, and the second oldest extant state school in Wales. (Note: Christ College, Brecon (founded 1541) and Friars School, Bangor (founded 1557))

== History ==
=== 1557 Establishment ===
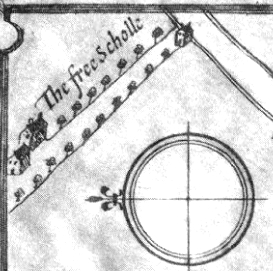
Detail from John Speed map of 1610, the only surviving image of the original school building

The school was founded by Geoffrey Glyn who had been brought up in Anglesey and had followed a career in law in London. A friary had been established in Bangor by the Dominican Order, or Black Friars, in the 13th century. At the dissolution of the monasteries, the friary was wound up in 1538. Geoffrey Glyn bought the site with a view to establishing a grammar school. In his will dated 8 July 1557, he left the property and endowments towards establishing the school.

Geoffrey's will left the property to his brother William Glyn, Bishop of Bangor and Maurice Griffith, Bishop of Rochester, for them to execute his wishes. However, both of these died in the following year, but they further transferred the will to Sir William Petre, a former Secretary of State, Sir William Garrard, a former Lord Mayor of London and Simon Lowe, a London merchant tailor, who were able to fulfill Geoffrey Glyn's intentions.

Although a school had been meeting in the city before this date, the new school was only formally established when it received letters patent from Elizabeth I in 1561. The school was to be known as The free grammar school of Geoffrey Glyn, Doctor of Laws, but because of the connection with the Black Friars, later became known as "Friars School". The letters patent established the dean and chapter of Bangor Cathedral as the corporation to govern the school. In 1568, statutes were adopted to regulate the schools, based closely on the statutes of Bury St. Edmunds School in Suffolk, founded a few years earlier.

The school has been established to provide a free grammar school education for the boys of the poor. This comprised a classical education, in Latin and Greek only. The boys who benefited were not the most poor, but of the middle class preparing for a career in the priesthood or the law like Geoffrey Glyn himself.

The school was maintained from income on the endowments left by Geoffrey Glyn and later benefactors, mainly rents on land in Southwark and a rent charge on land in Oswestry purchased using money left by Glyn.

The school continued in the old friary, close to the banks of the River Adda for over two centuries (at 53°13′52″N 4°07′26″W).

=== The second building, 1789 ===
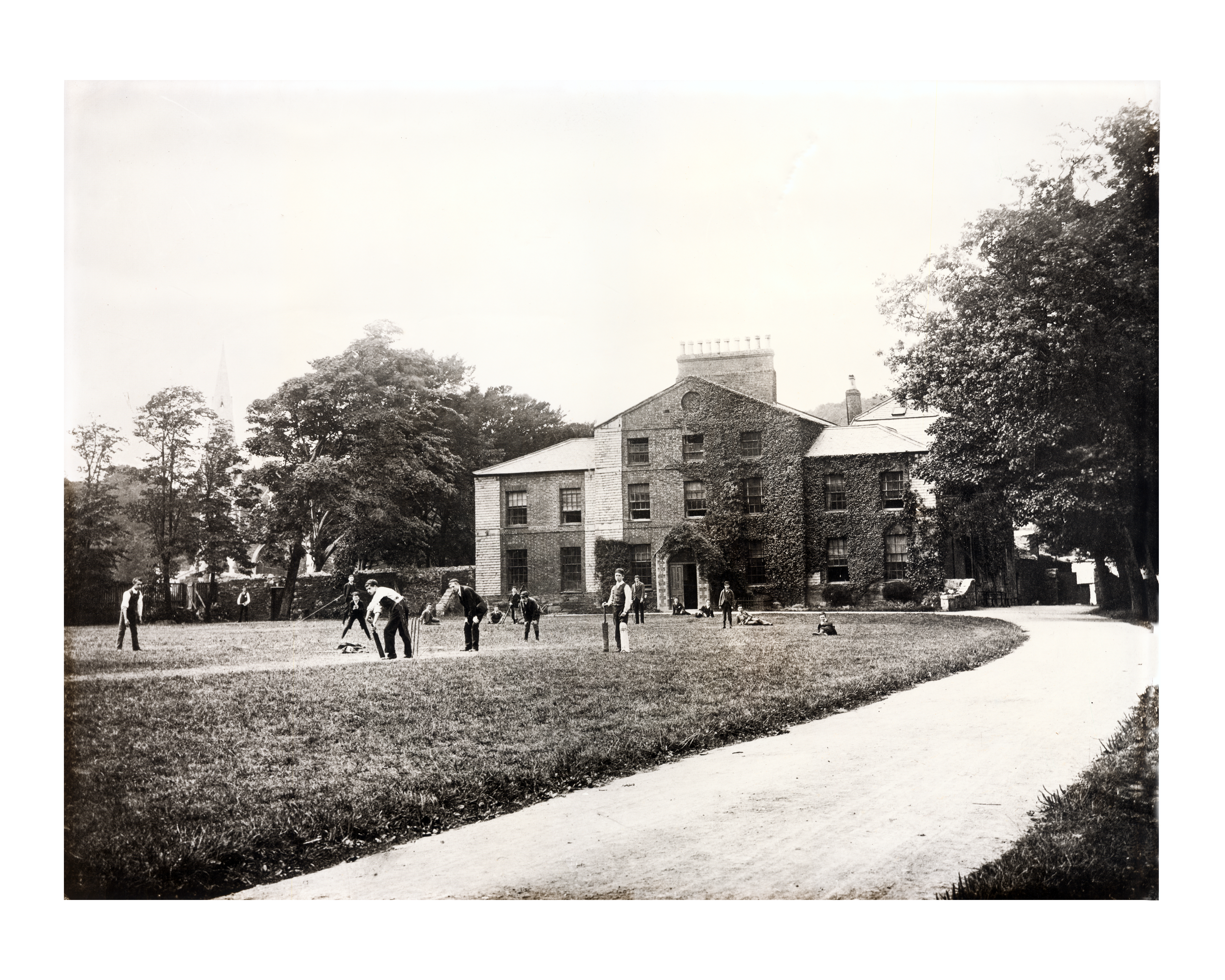
Friars School building of 1789 to 1900

Under the patronage of John Warren, Bishop of Bangor, the school was transferred to a better site, a little further from the river. This was financed partly by closing the school in 1786, an accumulating the money saved from the endowment for a building fund. The new school was built for £2,076 12s 5½d, and opened in 1789 on a site (at 53°13′48″N 4°07′19″W), all closer to the High Street and the present Glynne Road.

The curriculum slowly developed to include mathematics, writing and other subject more familiar to today's school students.

The school's fortunes were varied. The move boosted the school, but by the middle of the 19th century, under the headship of Totton, the schools' reputation suffered, and ultimately lost so many pupils that it was forced to close in 1861. It re-opened in 1866 and a new headmaster, Lewis Lloyd appointed in 1872, when a new secular governing body was introduced in place of the dean and chapter.

In 1881, an epidemic of typhoid in Bangor caused the school to move to Penmaenmawr to avoid the disease. The bottom of the valley, especially close to the river, was unhygienic, and this episode engendered consideration of moving away to a fresh site.

At this time, too, the Welsh Intermediate Education Act 1889 introduced a state system of secondary education in Wales. Some charity and private schools were exempted from its provisions and there had been advocates for Friars, too, to be exempted, but ultimately this brought Friars School into the state system, under Caernarfonshire County council.

=== The third building, 1900 ===
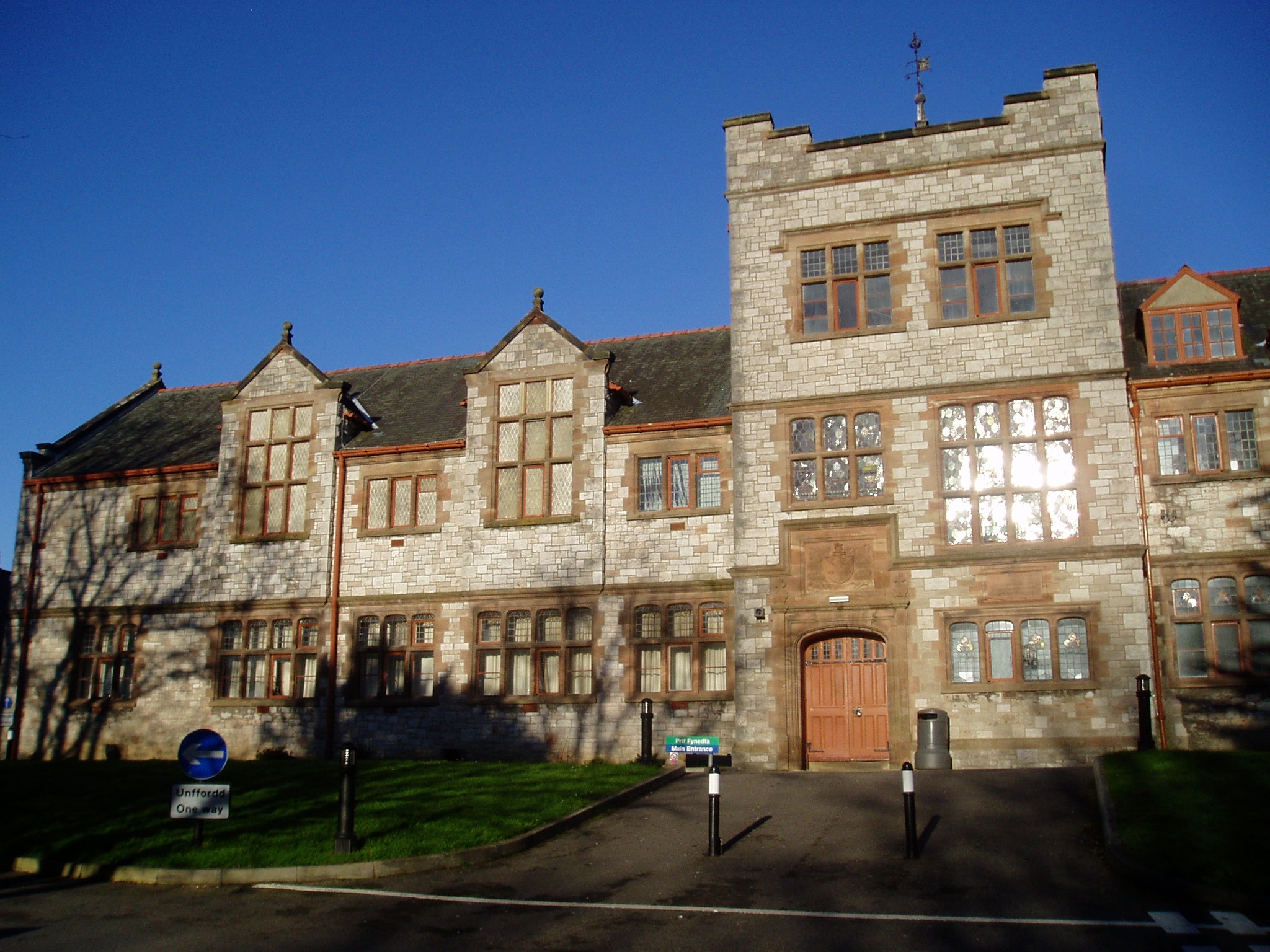
Friars School Ffriddoedd building, site of the school 1900–1999

With contributions from Caernarfonshire County Council, the proceeds of selling the old site, together with a public appeal for funds, a new school was built on Ffriddoedd Road for a cost of £11,600. The architect was John Douglas of Douglas & Minishull, and builders Messrs. James Hamilton & son of Altrincham. A foundation stone was laid by Watkin Herbert Williams, Bishop of Bangor on 12 April 1899, and the building was opened in December 1900 (at 53°13′24″N 4°08′37″W).

In moving to the Ffriddoedd site, the intention had been to move out to the countryside. After the typhoid outbreak, and with the unsanitary condition of the lower Adda valley, Ffriddoedd was seen as a healthy rural alternative. However, the development of the city was to catch up. To preserve a little of that rural idyll as the area developed, R. L. Archer, a former chairman of the governors, in 1955 bequeathed to the school a small plot of land. Known as "Dr. Archer's plot", this was to be planted with flowers and kept for ever green. The site has since become a community garden under its Welsh name 'Cae Doctor'.

In 1957, several events commemorated the fourth centenary of the school. A new stained glass window was installed in the building to mark the event.

=== 1971 Reorganisation ===
Up to 1971, Friars had been a grammar school for boys. As a grammar school, education was selective, boys having to pass the eleven plus exam to gain admission.

A significant reorganisation in 1971 combined three schools – Friars School, the Bangor County School for Girls (also a grammar school), and Deiniol School, a co-educational Secondary modern school. The three schools brought together formed a new comprehensive school, under the Friars name, but on three sites. The former girls' school became the Tryfan site, a Welsh language medium for the lower years, while the Ffriddoedd building was the location of the English language medium lower years. The senior years came together at a new building, built for £300,000 on a new site at Eithinog.

A further reorganisation in 1978 split the school in two: Ysgol Tryfan was formed as an 11–18 Welsh medium school on the Tryfan site. Friars School became a mainly English-medium school on Ffriddoedd and Eithinog sites.

Shoddy building practices of the 1960s meant that the Eithinog building had to be almost completely rebuilt over the following few decades. These were gradually replaced and expanded, until the whole school was able to relocate to Eithinog in 1999. The final contract for completing the school was valued at £5.4 million.

In that year, the former Friars building at Ffriddoedd was sold to further education college Coleg Menai and continues in educational use.

=== Celebrating 450 years ===
A service of commemoration and thanksgiving was held in Bangor Cathedral in April 2007 to mark 450 years of Friars School.

== The modern school ==
Since 1999, the present school has been united on the Eithinog site.

It is a comprehensive school for the 11–18 age group, and draws pupils from a wide area around Bangor. The school's current student body totals 1346, with many pupils travelling from Anglesey, North Arfon, the Llŷn peninsula and further afield. Ysgol Friars is the largest secondary school in Gwynedd and one of the largest in North Wales.

The school is also a competitor in the F1 in Schools competition since 2007. The 1st team reached the national final after winning the regional in Bangor University.

== Welsh language ==
According to the Estyn inspection report in 2017, almost 70% of pupils could speak Welsh to some degree and about 16% of pupils were fluent in Welsh. In 2025, 11.7% of pupils spoke Welsh at home.

The school is currently categorised by Welsh Government as a predominantly English-medium secondary school with significant use of Welsh. The categorisation means that both languages are used in teaching, with 20 - 49% of subjects [available to be taught] through the medium of Welsh. Ysgol Friars is the only secondary school in Gwynedd that teaches pupils mainly through the medium of English.

In 2016, Councillor Gareth Thomas, Gwynedd Council's Cabinet Member for Education, accepted the Service Scrutiny Committee's recommendation that Ysgol Friars should, with council support, identify opportunities to make further progress in the use of the Welsh language across the curriculum and life of the school.

== Remains and artefacts ==
Traces of the older sites are seen in names of streets: Friars Avenue, Glynne Road, and building: Friars Terrace, Glyn House. A plaque on houses in Glynne Road records the site of the 1789 buildings.

The Ffriddoedd building has lasted well and is now a Grade II listed building. Having been used by Coleg Menai, in 2025 it was announced that Bangor University had acquired the site and would be developing it as the Albert Gubay Business School.

== Symbols ==
The school colours are black and yellow, the black deriving from the dress of the Black Friars.

The school logo and badge is a double-headed black eagle on a yellow shield. This was taken from the arms of the Glyn family of Glynllifon, in the mistaken impression that these were the arms of Geoffrey Glyn. Despite this error (Geoffrey Glyn's arms having been three saddles), the double-headed eagle survived.

The Latin motto, Foedere Fraterno – "On with the brotherhood" – again recall the Black Friars.

These symbols, which once graced the caps and blazers of grammar school boys, are today seen on polo shirts and sweatshirts of the modern school.

The school's Air Training Corps squadron was granted the number '1557' in recognition of the school's year of foundation. The Air Cadets squadron, which is still located within the school ground is officially known as '1557 (Friars) Squadron'.

== Notable alumni ==
- Akira the Don, real name Adam Narkiewicz, independent British rapper and producer
- William Ambrose – nonconformist minister and poet
- James Atkin, Baron Atkin – lawyer and judge
- Dewi Bebb – Rugby international.
- Arthur Butler, Bishop of Tuam, Killala and Achonry from 1957–69, and Bishop of Connor from 1969–81
- Hugh David – actor and television director
- Ednyfed Hudson Davies, chairman since 1991 of the Lincs FM Group, and Labour MP from 1966–70 for Conwy, and from 1979–83 for Caerphilly
- John Edward Daniel – academic and politician
- David Ffrangcon Davies – baritone
- Gwenan Edwards – Television presenter and journalist
- Gruffydd Evans, Baron Evans of Claughton, president of the Liberal Party from 1977–8
- William R. P. George – lawyer, poet and politician
- James Gray – mathematician and physicist, and Cargill Professor of Applied Physics from 1920–34 at the University of Glasgow
- Mary Dilys Glynne - plant pathologist (her mother Dilys Glynne Jones was a founding governor).
- Tony Gray – rugby international and coach.
- George Guest – organist and choirmaster
- Humphrey Jones – international footballer
- Maurice Jones – priest and educator
- Harold King, chemist
- Reuben Levy, Persian scholar, professor of Persian at the University of Cambridge
- Frederick Llewellyn-Jones, Liberal MP from 1929–35 for Flintshire
- Dewi Llwyd – BBC journalist and broadcaster
- Angus McDermid – BBC journalist and broadcaster.
- Robert Mills-Roberts – surgeon and international footballer
- George Osborne Morgan – politician
- John Morris-Jones – scholar and poet
- Goronwy Owen – poet
- Richard Parry-Jones - engineer
- Daniel Parsons, professor of geology at University of Hull.
- David Price-White – politician, Conservative MP from 1945–50 for Caernarvon Boroughs
- Kiri Pritchard Mclean - Comedian and Writer
- Ben Roberts (1950–2021), actor, who was known for playing Chief Inspector Derek Conway in the British television series, The Bill.
- Eric Roberts, Bishop of St David's from 1971–82
- Thomas John Thomas – international footballer
- Sir Hugh Corbet Vincent – rugby player once capped for Wales, unsuccessful parliamentary candidate and prominent solicitor
- Sir Huw Wheldon, broadcaster, managing director from 1968–75 of BBC TV, and president from 1979–85 of the Royal Television Society (RTS)
- Philip Bruce White, microbiologist
- Michael Wigston, former Chief of the Air Staff
- John Frederick Williams, Dean of Llandaff from 1971–77
- Sir Ifor Williams, Welsh scholar
- Carlyle Witton-Davies

== Welsh Cup ==
Friars School also competed in the Welsh Cup competition during the 1870s.

Season	Competition	Round	Opposition	Score
1878–79	Welsh Cup	First Round	Rhyl	1–0
1878–79	Welsh Cup	Second Round	Wrexham	1–3

== See also ==
- List of non-ecclesiastical and non-residential works by John Douglas
- List of the oldest schools in the United Kingdom
