= Ysbyty Gwynedd =

Teaching hospital in Bangor, Gwynedd, Wales

- Betsi Cadwaladr University Health Board
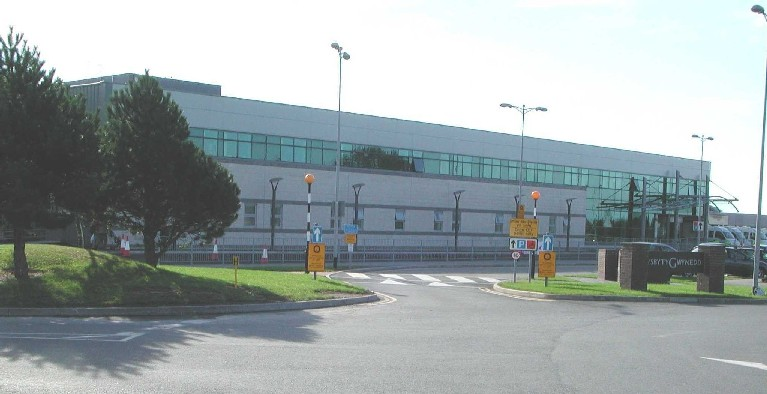
- Ysbyty Gwynedd

- Shown in Gwynedd

Geography
- Location: Bangor, Gwynedd, Wales
- Coordinates: 53.2090°N 4.1620°W

Organisation
- Care system: NHS Wales
- Type: Teaching hospital
- Affiliated university: North Wales Medical School, Bangor University

Services
- Emergency department: Yes
- Beds: 463

Helipads
- Helipad: Yes

History
- Opened: 1984

Links
- Website: bcuhb.nhs.wales/services/hospitals/ysbyty-gwynedd/

Ysbyty Gwynedd (Welsh for 'Gwynedd Hospital') is a teaching hospital in Bangor, Gwynedd, Wales. It is managed by Betsi Cadwaladr University Health Board.

== History ==
The hospital, which was commissioned to replace the aging Caernarfon and Anglesey Infirmary, opened in May 1984. A specialist cancer centre opened at the hospital in September 2010 and a major expansion of the accident and emergency facilities was completed in 2019. The foyer area was restructured internally in 2026.

The hospital has struggled to meet local demand for healthcare, with its health board being in special measures since 2013. In 2023, a coroner's report found staffing was inadequate for the levels of demand.

In January 2026, a temporary endoscopy unit was introduced to expand capacity.

== Facilities ==
The hospital has an emergency department, which serves all of North West Wales.

=== Mental health ===
An inpatient psychiatric unit, known as Hergest, is attached to the hospital. It has been criticised in inspections for poor conditions and patient environments. In 2013, complaints from staff resulted in an investigation into the unit. The subsequent Holden Report found there had been a breakdown in staff-manager relations.

=== Maternity ===
The hospital provides regional midwife-led and obstetric units. In 2025, a coroner found 'gross' failures in maternity care, which resulted in a baby's death. A similar incident occurred again in January 2026.

=== Teaching ===
The hospital is associated with Bangor University, providing placements for the nursing and medical schools. A North Wales Clinical School was first established at the hospital in 2004, to provide placements and teaching for Cardiff University School of Medicine and foundation doctors. From 2024, this was succeeded by a medical school at Bangor University.

=== Radio Ysbyty Gwynedd ===
The Radio Ysbyty Gwynedd hospital radio was named "station of the year" at the Hospital Radio Associations 2022 awards, and won a digital radio award at the 2022 Community Radio Awards.

== Gallery ==
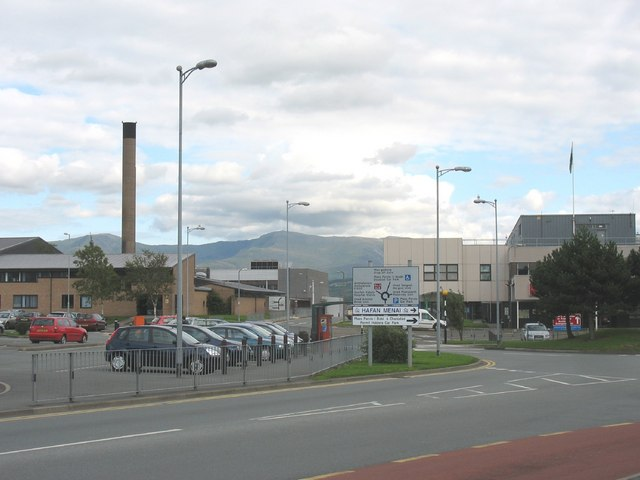
Entrance to the hospital

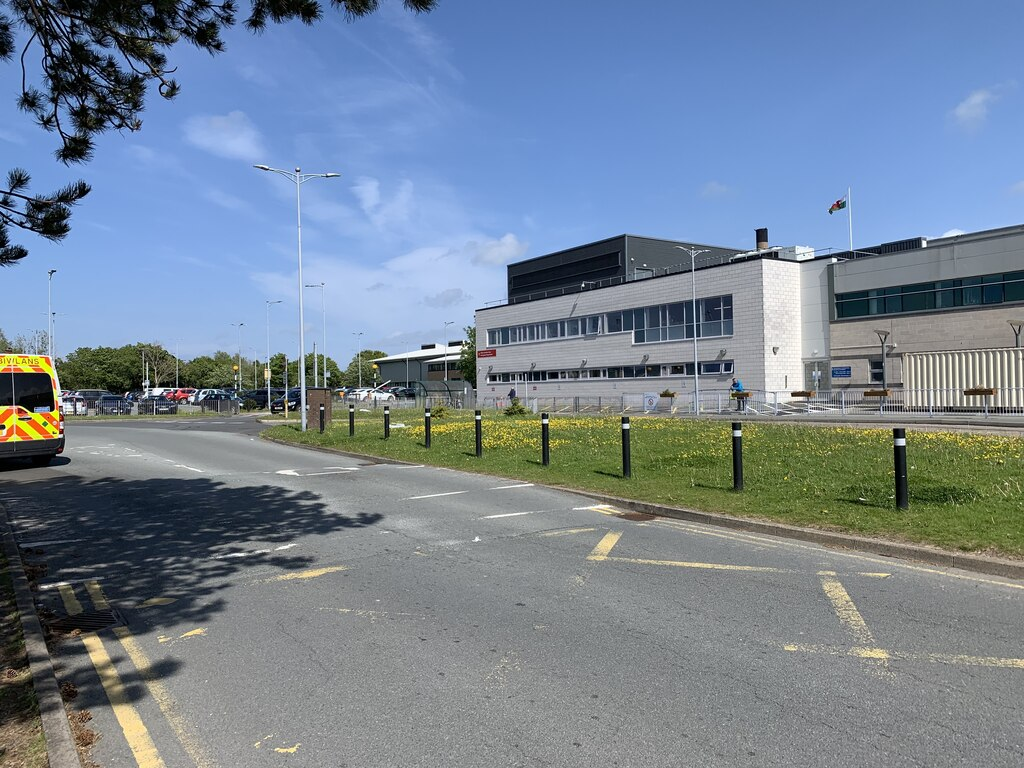
The new emergency department and endoscopy block

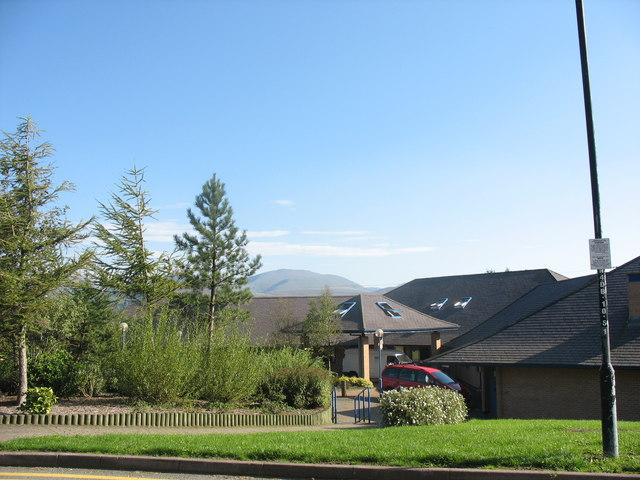
Hergest psychiatric unit

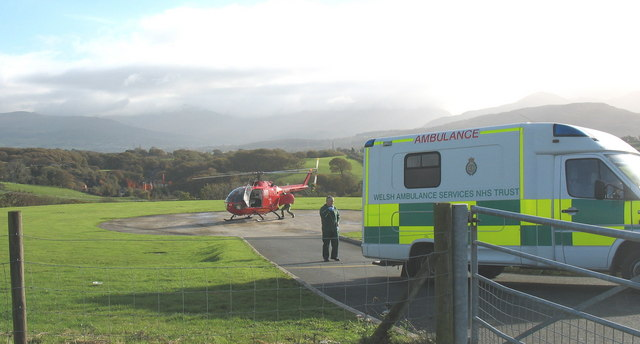
The hospital helipad

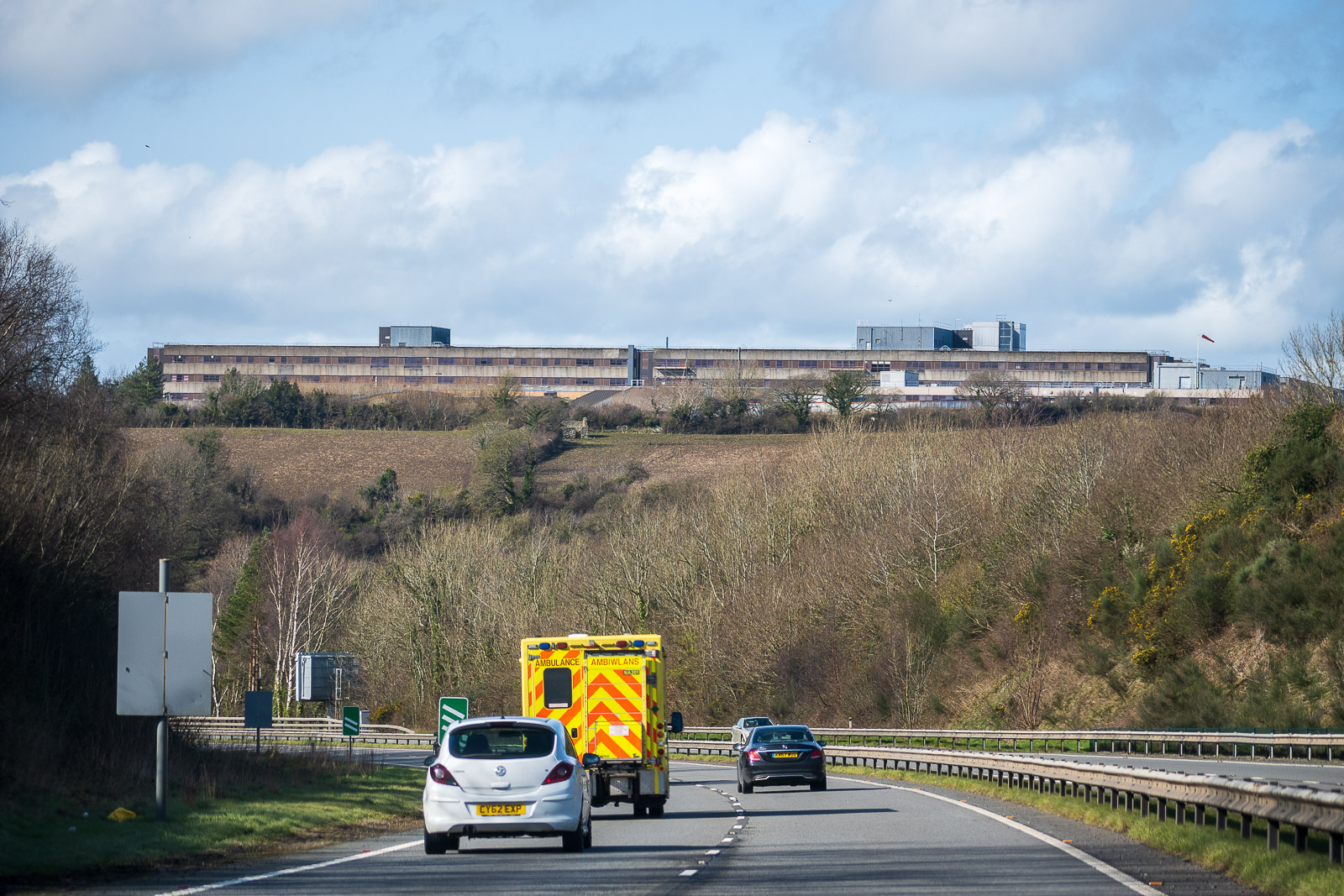
Rear view

== See also ==
- List of hospitals in Wales
- NHS Wales
