= Port Waterloo =

Hamlet in Caernarfon, Gwynedd, Wales

Coordinates: 53.153568°N 4.260956°W

Port Waterloo: Welsh: Porth Waterloo/Porth y Dwr
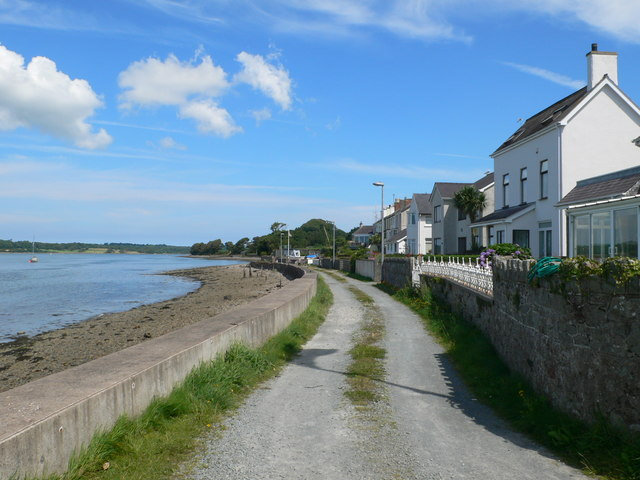
- Porth Waterloo and the Menai Strait

- Location within Gwynedd
- Principal area: Gwynedd
- Preserved county: Gwynedd
- Country: Wales
- Sovereign state: United Kingdom
- Post town: CAERNARFON
- Postcode district: LL55
- Police: North Wales
- Fire: North Wales
- Ambulance: Welsh
- UK Parliament: Ynys Môn
- Senedd Cymru – Welsh Parliament: Bangor Conwy Môn

Waterloo Port, also known as Porth Waterloo, or Porth y Dwr is a coastal hamlet and area of Caernarfon in Gwynedd, Wales.

It lies midway between Caernarfon and Bangor, the Isle of Anglesey is directly opposite the hamlet, across the Menai Strait. It is part of the community of Caernarfon.

== History ==
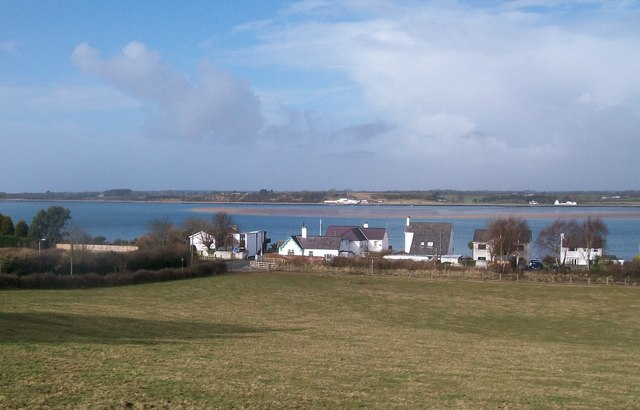
Porth Waterloo and the Menai Strait from the A487 road.

Waterloo Port was once part the parish of Llanbeblig, part of the Hundred of Is-Gorfai in Caernarfonshire.

After being annexed and becoming a part of Caernarfon, Porth Waterloo did not see any real changes to how daily life was for its residents. It became known for its seaweed farming and this trade continued into the 1970s.

== Transport ==
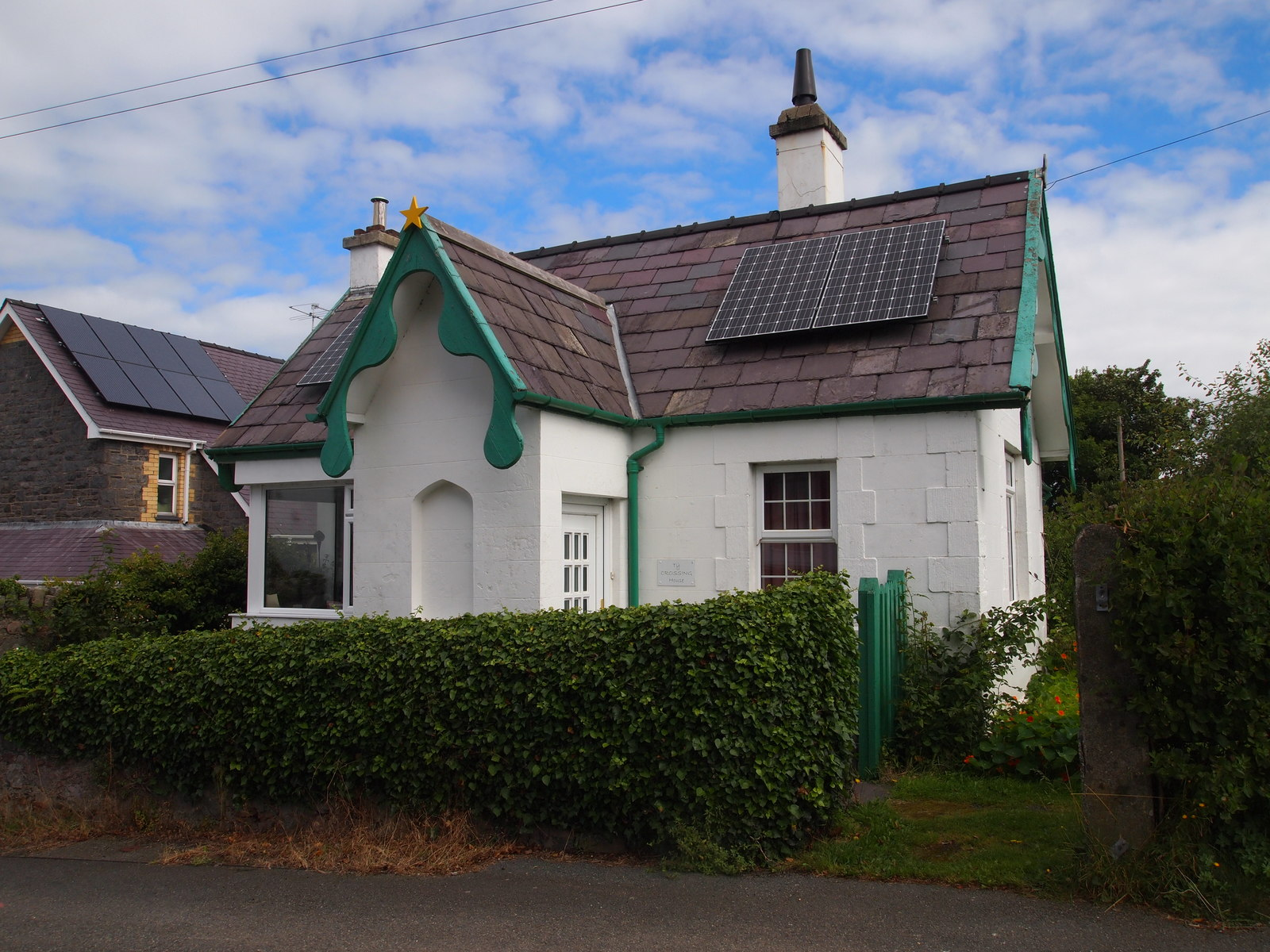
Ty Crossing cottage, which used to be used to control the now-removed level crossing between Caernarfon and Griffith's Crossing on the Bangor and Carnarvon Railway.

The Bangor and Carnarvon Railway opened in the May 1851, connecting Bangor and Caernarfon. It passed directly through the middle of the hamlet, although no station was opened to serve it. The nearest stations were both Caernarvon and Griffith's Crossing.

The station at Griffith's Crossing was closed in 1937, with Caernarvon station remaining the closest station to the hamlet until its closure in 1970. The line was also closed between Caernarvon and Menai Bridge but was reopened temporarily following the Britannia Bridge 1970 fire. This temporarily saw freight reusing the line for ships to Ireland until the bridge was repaired in 1972 and the line was once again fully closed.

Today, the old trackbed between Bangor and Caernarfon has become mostly reused for the Lôn Eifion between Dinas and Caernarfon. Although the section north towards Treborth and Bangor is now mostly occupied by the A487 road and other developments. There are proposals to reinstate the line between Bangor and Caernarfon, and then possibly to Afon Wen, via the former Carnarvonshire Railway.

Regular buses now connect the hamlet to Caernarfon and Bangor, as well as other towns such as Llandudno, Deganwy, Llandudno Junction, Conwy, Llanfairfechan, Penmaenmawr, Porthmadog, Dolgellau, Machynlleth and Aberystwyth.

== Present day ==
Today, Port Waterloo remains a quiet coastal hamlet, with only minor developments that have now made it a part of the town of Caernarfon. It is a popular tourist attraction and holiday hamlet. Despite this, it still retains its distinct coastal scenery and views across the Menai Strait towards the Isle of Anglesey.
