= Bangor railway station (Wales) =

Railway station in Gwynedd, Wales

Bangor
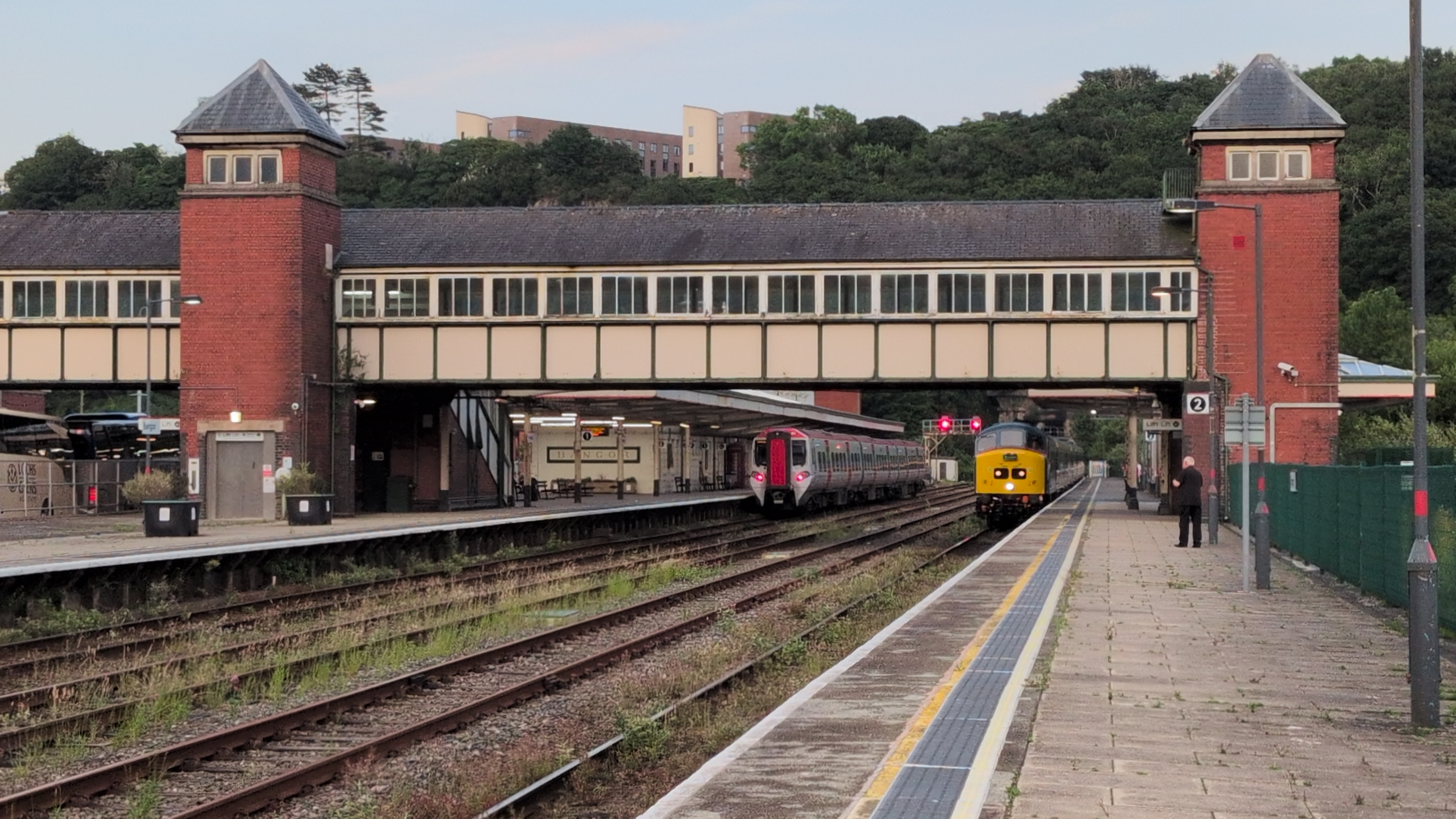
- Bangor railway station, looking on both platforms in 2026.

General information
- Location: Bangor, Gwynedd; Wales
- Coordinates: 53.222°N 4.136°W
- Grid reference: SH575716
- Owner: Network Rail
- Manager: Transport for Wales Rail
- Platforms: 2

Other information
- Station code: BNG
- Classification: DfT category C1

History
- Original company: Chester and Holyhead Railway
- Pre-grouping: London and North Western Railway
- Post-grouping: London, Midland and Scottish Railway

Key dates
- 1 May 1848: Opened as Bangor
- ?: Renamed Bangor (Caernarfonshire)
- ?: Renamed Bangor (Gwynedd)

Passengers
- 2020/21: ▼0.106 million
- Interchange: ▼47
- 2021/22: ▲0.445 million
- Interchange: ▲250
- 2022/23: ▲0.578 million
- Interchange: ▲502
- 2023/24: ▲0.697 million
- Interchange: ▲596
- 2024/25: ▲0.720 million
- Interchange: ▲610

Listed Building – Grade II
- Feature: Railway Station Original Building
- Designated: 2 August 1988
- Reference no.: 4122
Location
Notes
- Passenger statistics from the Office of Rail and Road

Bangor railway station serves the city of Bangor in Gwynedd, North West Wales. it is operated by Transport for Wales. The station, which is 24 3/4 miles (40 km) east of Holyhead, is the last mainland station on the North Wales Coast line between Crewe and Holyhead. It is the busiest in terms of passenger numbers in North Wales, as it serves the community around Caernarfon and further west. It is close to the Snowdonia National Park and Bangor University, and has an interchange with bus services to the various towns and villages of north-west Gwynedd and Anglesey.

== History ==
The station, which cost £6,960 to build (about £21 million in 2015), was opened on 1 May 1848 by the Chester and Holyhead Railway. Lying between Bangor Tunnel to the east of the station, and Belmont Tunnel to the west, the station was progressively expanded into a junction station as a number of branch lines were opened:

- From Menai Bridge to Caernarvon (Bangor and Carnarvon Railway) (1848)
- From Gaerwen to Amlwch (Anglesey Central Railway) (1866)
- From Holland Arms to Red Wharf Bay and Benllech (Red Wharf Bay branch line) (1909)
- To Bethesda (Bethesda Branch) (1884)

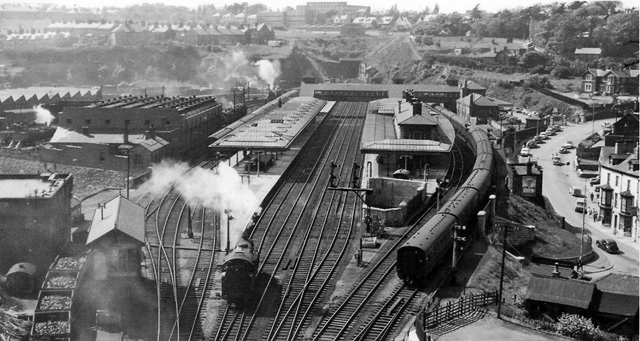
Bangor station in 1961

The station was renamed twice under British Railways: originally Bangor, it became Bangor (Caerns); then Bangor (Gwynedd). In some timetables it was shown as Bangor for Beaumaris.

The present building on platform 1 was the main building, with a forecourt on the site of the present car park. Between 1924 and 1927 an additional loop line and platform were constructed on the site of the forecourt with a new frontage facing Deiniol Road, which is still in use as the station booking office. Ultimately there were four platforms and a small bay platform to serve the main line and branch lines.

By the 1950s there were an extensive goods yard, a five-road engine shed (on the site of the steel mill), a turntable, three-road goods shed, two signal boxes, an extra footbridge and a subway connecting platforms. There were a total of nine separate through routes from one tunnel to the other.

With the closure of the branch lines in the 1960s and 1970s, the station was reduced to just two operational platforms, with the track and platform on the pre-1920s forecourt converted back to something like its original use.

In November 2009 the Welsh Assembly Government asked Network Rail to conduct a feasibility study on reopening the line between Llangefni on Anglesey and Bangor for passenger services. Network Rail was asked to assess the track bed before publishing its report in 2010. Work to clear away 21 years of vegetation began in April 2012. It was confirmed by the Welsh Government in May 2017 that re-opening a station in Llangefni for passenger services using part of the mothballed Anglesey Central Railway line was under consideration, which would connect into the existing main line at Gaerwen.

== Present day ==
The station presently uses two large island platforms, each served by loop lines which diverge from and rejoin the main lines in each direction. The main lines pass between the two operational platforms, and are used for passing empty stock movements, for terminated trains to lay-over awaiting their next working, and freight services, particularly the carriage of nuclear fuel flasks to and from Wylfa nuclear power station on Anglesey. At the western end of the station at the mouth of Belmont Tunnel, is a cross-over between the up main line and the down main line. Diverging from the down main line, also at the western end of the station, are four sidings; two adjacent to the most southerly platform island, and the other two enclosed within the nearby Network Rail engineering compound. Bangor signal box, which can be found at the western end of the up-direction platform, is lever-operated and controls the signals, points and user-worked level crossings as far as Abergwyngregyn to the east of Bangor, and Llanfairpwll to the west, including the single line crossing the Britannia Bridge between the Welsh mainland and Anglesey.

== Facilities ==
The station is staffed 7 days a week (except Christmas Day and Boxing Day, when there are no train services) by both platform staff, who assist mobility-impaired passengers, dispatch the trains and provide travel advice, and booking office clerks. The platform building houses rail staff offices, passenger toilets and a waiting room, a café, and a British Transport Police station. Each platform is equipped with an electronic departure screen, and manual announcements are made over a public address system. There are two self-service ticket vending machines available for passengers to purchase or collect pre-paid tickets. Due to there being ticket purchasing facilities available 24 hours a day, passengers boarding trains here must purchase their tickets before boarding the train.

There are storage racks for bicycles available on or near both platforms.

The whole station is fully accessible for those with mobility impairments. The footbridge is accessed from both platforms by a staircase as well as a lift, as well as a third staircase from the station concourse area outside the booking office. The up-direction (Chester-bound) platform can also be accessed step-free via a ramp from the front car park, accessible off Station Road/Holyhead Road, and the down-direction (Holyhead-bound) platform is accessible step-free through the rear car park, located off Caernarfon Road. An accessible toilet is available on platform 1.

The station has two long stay car parks, to the front and rear of the station. 20 minutes of free parking is available in designated areas for the picking up or dropping off of passengers. The rear car park occupies part of the site of the former carriage sidings.

Free Wi-Fi is provided for waiting passengers on the platforms and the waiting room.

Many local taxi firms operate from the taxi rank located to the rear of the ticket office building, adjacent to platform 1.

Transport for Wales had committed to investing £194 million on upgrades to stations over the first 5 years of their franchise contract. Bangor station can expect to have been fully re-branded with the installation of new digital information screens and CCTV by 2024.

== Services ==
There is a basic hourly service eastbound towards Wrexham General and Shrewsbury via Llandudno Junction, Colwyn Bay, Rhyl, Prestatyn, Flint and Chester, with alternate services extended to Birmingham International and Cardiff Central during the daytime, as well as westbound across Anglesey to Holyhead.

This hourly service is complemented by several through services to and from London Euston and Crewe which run to/from Holyhead (except for one service per weekday). On Weekdays, there are four trains per day each way to/from London Euston, as well as an additional service from London to Bangor. There are also two trains per day each way between Crewe and Holyhead, with one of the Holyhead-bound trains starting from Birmingham New Street, as well as a northbound only service from Crewe to Holyhead, and another northbound only service originating from Crewe that terminates here. On Saturdays, there are two northbound services per day between London Euston and Holyhead, and two services from Crewe to Holyhead, with three southbound services from Holyhead to London Euston and one service from Holyhead to Crewe. These services are operated by Avanti West Coast. In addition there are several early morning & late night trains run by Transport for Wales Rail running to/from Crewe and two trains to and from Manchester Piccadilly on weekdays, and one on Saturdays to/from Manchester Airport in the current (May to December 2020) timetable.

Transport for Wales Rail services towards Cardiff are usually operated by Class 175 diesel multiple unit trains, with the exception of the Premier Service which is operated by a rake of Mark 4 coaches hauled by a Class 67 diesel locomotive. Services towards Birmingham International are usually operated by Class 158 diesel multiple unit trains, allowing them to be coupled with services off the Cambrian Coast railway line upon arrival at Shrewsbury, to provide additional capacity between Shrewsbury and Birmingham. Another train formed of Mark 3 coaches hauled by a Class 67 locomotive also forms one of the weekday services to and from Manchester Piccadilly. All Avanti West Coast services are operated by Class 805 Evero bi-mode multiple unit trains.

On Sundays the service is hourly each way from mid-morning, but running mainly between Holyhead and Crewe, with select services extended to Cardiff Central, Birmingham International and Manchester Piccadilly. Avanti West Coast provide three up-direction trains to London Euston on a Sunday, as well as one up-direction train between Crewe and Holyhead, and three down-direction services to Holyhead.

The PlusBus scheme operates from this station, where for a small additional fee, an add-on bus ticket can be purchased alongside a rail ticket allowing journeys to be made using the services of most of the major bus operators in and around the wider area. This allows easy access by public transport to Ysbyty Gwynedd as well as many of the popular local attractions, such as Bangor Pier, Penrhyn Castle, Aber Falls and Zip World in Penrhyn Quarry, Bethesda, all of which are inside the Bangor PlusBus area. Easy interchange with all local bus services is possible, with many services departing from the bus stops a very short walk away on Holyhead Road.

| Preceding station | National Rail | Following station |
|---|---|---|
| Llanfairfechan | Transport for Wales Rail; North Wales Coast Line | Llanfairpwll |
| Llandudno Junction | Transport for Wales Rail; Premier Service | Holyhead |
| Llandudno Junction | Avanti West Coast; London and the West Midlands to North Wales | Holyhead |
| | Historical railways | |
| Terminus | London and North Western Railway; Bethesda branch line | Felin Hen Halt; Line and station closed |
| Terminus | London and North Western Railway; Bangor and Carnarvon Railway | Menai Bridge; Line open, station closed |
| Terminus | London and North Western Railway; Anglesey Central Railway | Menai Bridge; Line open, station closed |

== Future services ==
By December 2022, Transport for Wales plans to start & terminate its direct services to and from Manchester Airport via Manchester Piccadilly at Bangor. This will be in addition to the current service level, and will be made possible when the new hourly Llandudno-Liverpool Lime Street via the Halton Curve services commence. All Transport for Wales services serving Bangor by this time are expected to be operated by new CAF Civity diesel multiple-unit trains, except the Holyhead-Cardiff Premier Service which is expected to be operated by refurbished Mark IV coaches inherited from LNER, hauled by Class 67 locomotives.
