= Menai Bridge railway station =

Disused railway station in Gwynedd, Wales

Menai Bridge
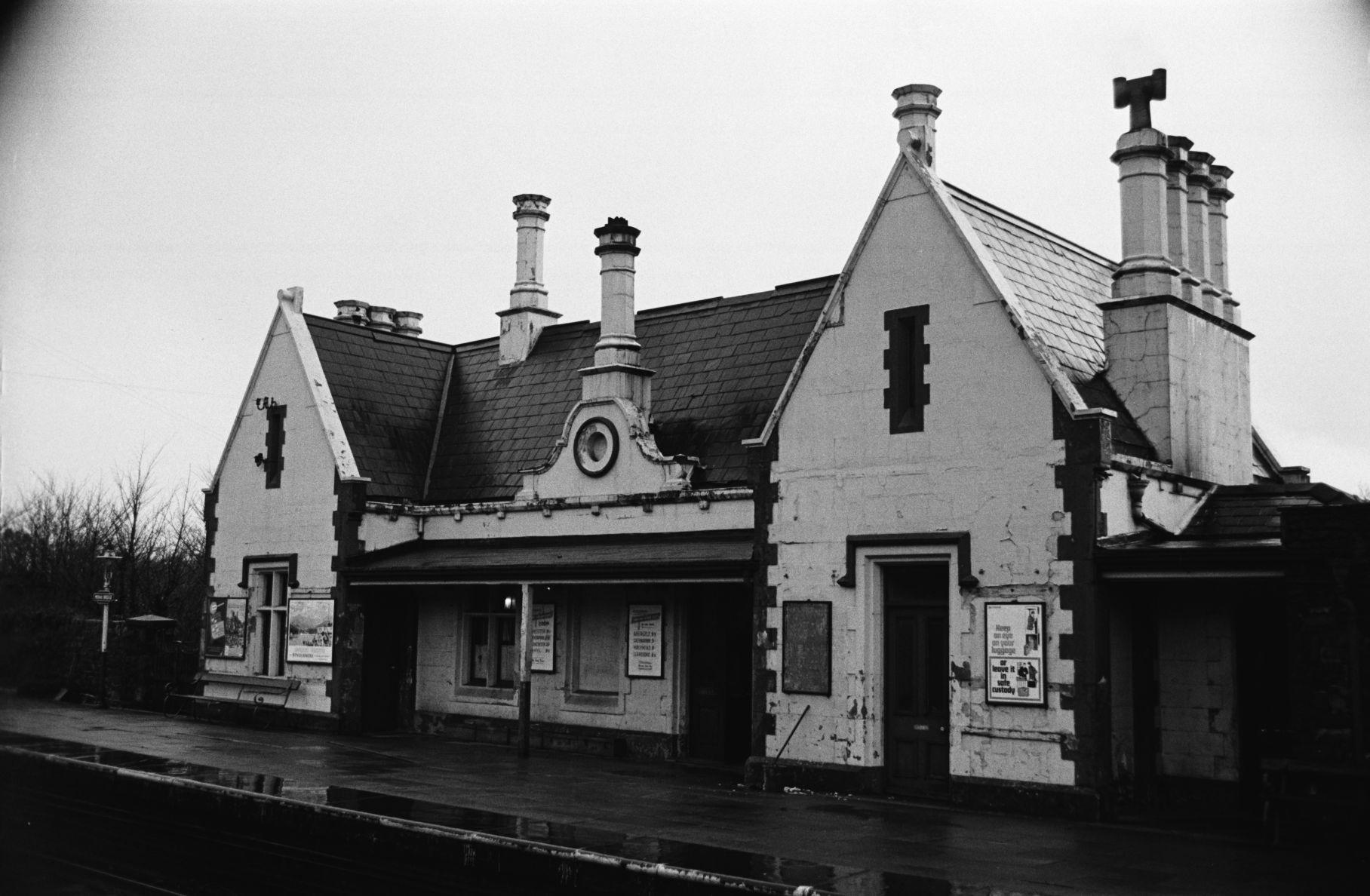
- Station in 1966

General information
- Location: Treborth, Gwynedd; Wales
- Coordinates: 53.2176°N 4.1629°W
- Grid reference: SH556711
- Platforms: 4

Other information
- Status: Disused

History
- Original company: Chester and Holyhead Railway
- Pre-grouping: London and North Western Railway
- Post-grouping: London, Midland and Scottish Railway

Key dates
- 1 October 1858: Opened
- 14 February 1966: Closed to passengers
- 4 March 1968: Closed for goods
Location

Menai Bridge railway station is a disused railway station situated in the Bangor suburb of Treborth in Gwynedd, North West Wales. It was built to serve the town of Menai Bridge on the Isle of Anglesey, although it was across the Menai Strait from the town, this station.

== History ==
Opened on 1 October 1858 it was a replacement for the earlier Britannia Bridge station, named after the bridge of the same name which crosses the nearby Menai Strait a couple of hundred meters to the north.

The station was opened by the Chester and Holyhead Railway Company at the point where the main Chester to Holyhead line met the Bangor and Carnarvon Railway. There were four platforms, two for each line and two which formed an Island platform. The main station building was a large brick built, while there was a brick waiting shelter on the island platform.

=== Closure ===
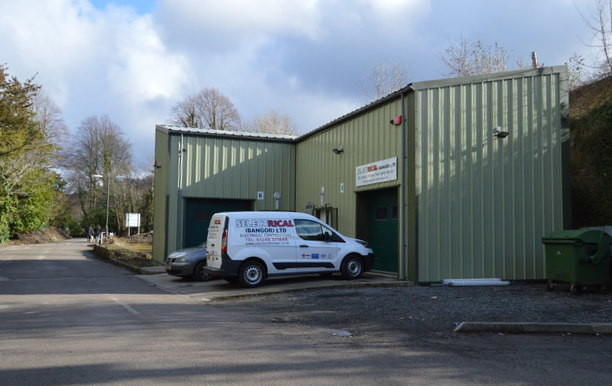
Treborth Business Park is standing on the site of former railway station

The station closed to passenger services on 14 February 1966. In 1966 the Caernarfon line was switched to single track. On 4 August 1969 it closed to goods services. On 5 January 1970 the line also closed to passenger services. It was brought back into use for container traffic after 23 May 1970 Britannia Bridge fire. The bridge was repaired and re-opened on 30 January 1972. After that date the Caernarfon line closed for good and was lifted. The North Wales Coast Line runs through the site of the station (and becomes a single track there) but no visible remains of it can be seen.

Preceding station	Historical railways	Following station
Bangor; Line and station open	London and North Western Railway; North Wales Coast Line	Llanfairpwll; Line and station open
	Disused railways	
Bangor; Line and station open	London and North Western Railway; Bangor and Carnarvon Railway	Treborth; Line and station closed
Bangor; Line and station open	London and North Western Railway; Anglesey Central Railway	Llanfairpwll; Line and station open
