= Treborth railway station =

Disused railway station in Gwynedd, Wales

Treborth

General information
- Location: Wales
- Coordinates: 53.2102°N 4.1809°W
- Grid reference: SH544704
- Platforms: 2 after 1872

Other information
- Status: Disused

History
- Original company: Bangor and Carnarvon Railway
- Pre-grouping: London and North Western Railway
- Post-grouping: London, Midland and Scottish Railway

Key dates
- June 1854: Opened
- 1 October 1858: Closed for c 1 month
- 2 March 1959: Closed
Location

Treborth railway station was a railway station located on the Bangor and Carnarvon Railway, it served the Treborth suburb of Bangor in Caernarfonshire, Wales. It was opened in June 1854 on the line connecting the Menai Bridge with Caernarfon with a single platform and brick waiting room, the station was briefly closed in October 1858 for about a month. In 1872 a second platform was built and the station remained active until March 1959 when it was closed. The line itself was closed finally in 1972 and lifted shortly afterwards.

The station building was converted to a private residence and is still standing, being listed on the Royal Commission on the Ancient and Historical Monuments of Wales database.

Preceding station	Historical railways	Following station
Menai Bridge	Bangor and Carnarvon Railway	Port Dinorwic
