= Lôn Las Menai =

Coordinates: 52.977°N 4.265°W

Lôn Las Menai is a cycle route in Gwynedd, Wales. It is 7.4 km (4.6 miles) long and links Caernarfon and Y Felinheli along a section of the former Bangor and Carnarvon Railway trackbed. The route is almost entirely traffic-free and it forms part of part of Lôn Las Cymru.

== See also ==
- Rail trail
