= Port Dinorwic railway station =

Disused railway station in Gwynedd, Wales

Port Dinorwic
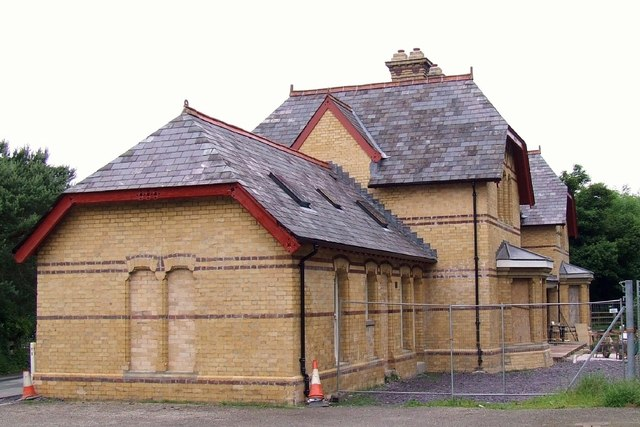

General information
- Location: Port Dinorwic, Gwynedd; Wales
- Coordinates: 53.1855°N 4.2050°W
- Platforms: 2

Other information
- Status: Disused

History
- Original company: Bangor and Carnarvon Railway
- Pre-grouping: London and North Western Railway
- Post-grouping: London, Midland and Scottish Railway

Key dates
- 1852: Opened
- 1874: Closed and replacement opened
- 1960: Closed to passengers
- 1964: Closed to all traffic
Location

Port Dinorwic railway station was the name of two railway stations located on the Bangor and Carnarvon Railway near the village of Port Dinorwic (now Y Felinheli), Gwynedd, Wales. The first station was opened in 1852 and closed in 1874. A replacement station with the same name was opened later in 1874. This closed to passengers in 1960 and to all traffic in 1964.

The stations were not the first in the village. Previously a small station for goods only was opened in 1824 on the Dinorwic Railway, which was later replaced by the 1842 Padarn Railway. These were built to take slate from the Dinorwic Quarry to the village. The new station of 1852 however connected local residents to passenger services throughout the country.

The line through the 1852 station was doubled in 1872. and it was decided to demolish it and build a new replacement on a site 200 yards to the south, nearer the village. This station was far more substantial with a two-storey yellow brick station building, ticket office, waiting room and toilets. The second (down) platform was connected by an underpass to the first and had a yellow brick shelter on it. A small signal box was found close by.

The main station building is still in existence and was Grade II listed in 1997.

Preceding station	Historical railways	Following station
Treborth	Bangor and Carnarvon Railway	Griffith's Crossing
