= Caernarvon railway station =

Former railway station in Caernarfon, Wales

Caernarvon
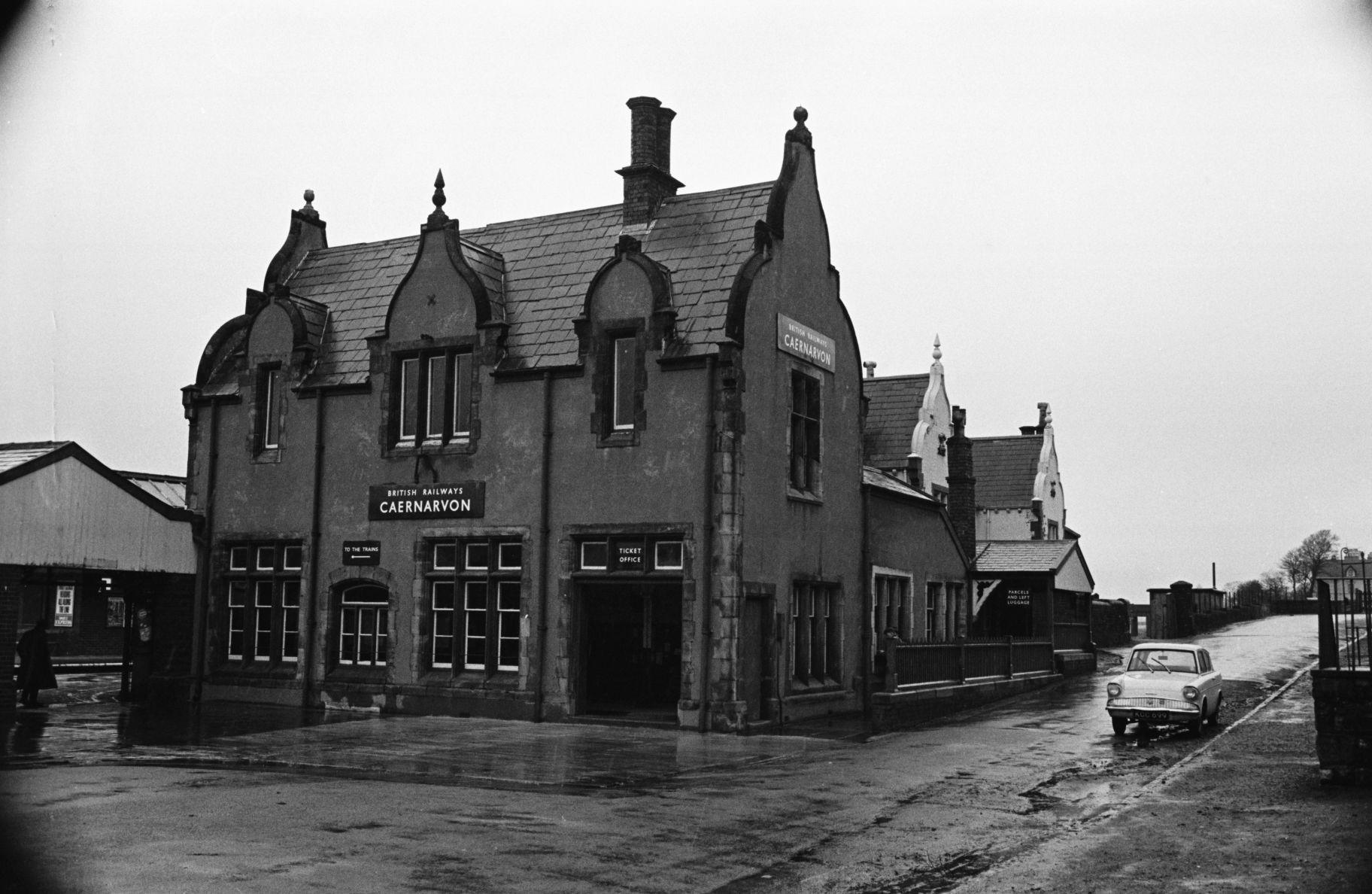
- Station in 1966

General information
- Location: Caernarfon; Wales
- Coordinates: 53.14461°N 4.27145°W
- Grid reference: SH 481 632
- Platforms: 5

Other information
- Status: Disused

History
- Original company: Bangor and Carnarvon Railway
- Pre-grouping: London and North Western Railway
- Post-grouping: London, Midland and Scottish Railway

Key dates
- 1 July 1852: Opened as Carnarvon
- 27 March 1926: Renamed Caernarvon
- 5 January 1970: Closed
- 23 May 1970: Temporarily reopened for freight
- 30 January 1972: Closed for freight
Location

Caernarvon railway station was a stop on the former Bangor and Carnarvon Railway between Caernarfon in Gwynedd and the Menai Suspension Bridge near Bangor, Wales. The station was closed to all traffic in January 1972; it has since been demolished and the site redeveloped.

== History ==
The station, which opened on 1 July 1852, was first named Carnarvon. (Note: Although the Welsh spelling of the town is Caernarfon, the English spelling was typically used by many railway companies.) The town was originally the terminus of the branch line from Menai Bridge, later becoming part of the Carnarvonshire Railway. In 1864, the Carnarvon and Llanberis Railway extended the branch line 8 miles (13 km) from Carnarvon station to Llanberis. A 163-yard (149 m) tunnel was constructed just south of the station to carry the new line; it was reopened in 1995 as a road tunnel.

By 1871, all three original companies were absorbed into the London and North Western Railway. The station was renamed Caernarvon on 27 March 1926. In December 1964, the lines to Afon Wen and Llanberis were closed under the Beeching Axe.

On 5 January 1970, Caernarvon was closed to all services. However, following a fire that badly damaged the Britannia Bridge over the Menai Straits on 23 May 1970, the branch and goods yard were temporarily reopened for freight traffic until 30 January 1972. The branch line to Caernarvon station was finally closed with the resumption of rail services to Anglesey and Holyhead in February 1972. The track was removed and the station was completely demolished.

Preceding station	Disused railways	Following station
Griffith's Crossing	London and North Western Railway; Carnarvonshire Railway	Dinas Junction
Griffith's Crossing	London and North Western Railway; Carnarvon and Llanberis Railway	Pont Rug (Halt)

== The site today ==
A Morrisons supermarket now occupies the site, having been built under the Safeway brand in the late 1980s. It was opened by the mayor of Caernarfon and was acquired by Morrisons in 2004.

== Services in Caernarfon ==
The Welsh Highland Railway (WHR) now operates from Caernarfon railway station; it uses the original trackbed of the Carnarvonshire Railway, just south of the tunnel on St Helen's Road and beneath the high retaining walls of Segontium Terrace.

Caernarfon Council have a longer-term plan to reinstate the railway link to Bangor. After speculation that the WHR would, at some point in time, be extended to Bangor station, the owner of the WHR (the Ffestiniog Railway) wrote to the council in January 2014 to confirm that they would not themselves be supportive of such a scheme in narrow gauge, but supported the reconnection of the town to the National Rail network using standard gauge.
