= Treborth =

Suburb of Bangor, Gwynedd, North West Wales

Coordinates: 53.208751°N 4.173770°W

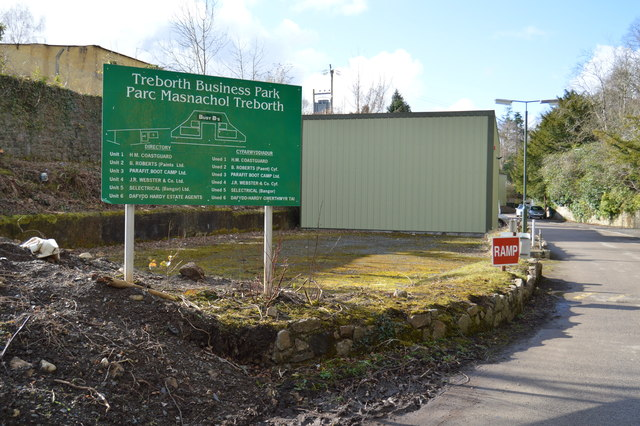
- The Treborth Business Park

- Location within Gwynedd
- Principal area: Gwynedd
- Preserved county: Gwynedd
- Country: Wales
- Sovereign state: United Kingdom
- Post town: BANGOR
- Postcode district: LL57
- Police: North Wales
- Fire: North Wales
- Ambulance: Welsh
- UK Parliament: Ynys Môn
- Senedd Cymru – Welsh Parliament: Bangor Conwy Môn

Treborth is a suburb of Bangor in Gwynedd, North West Wales. The area is notable for the Treborth Botanic Garden.

== History ==
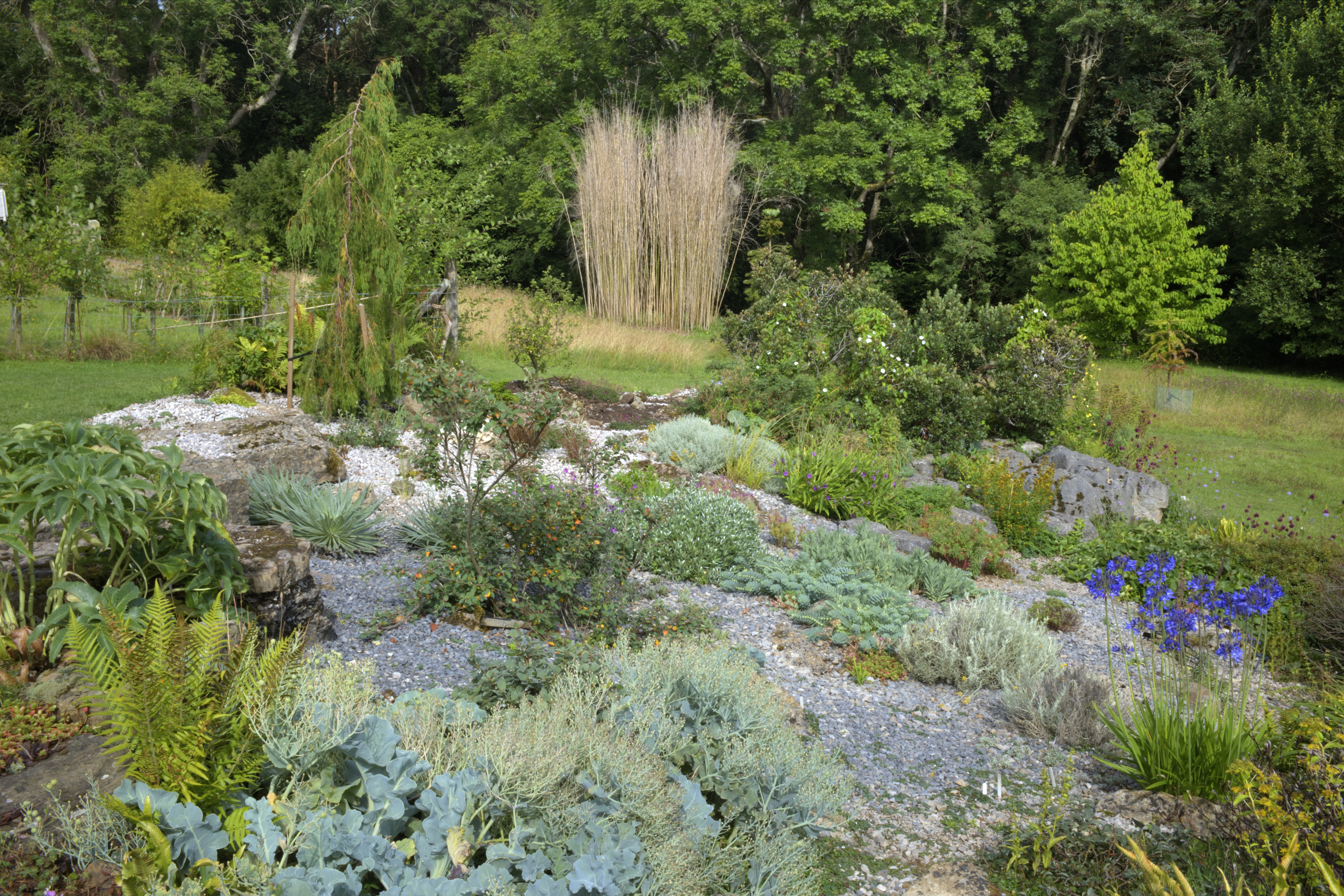
Treborth Botanical Gardens

Treborth was originally part of the Treborth Isaf Estate and Treborth Hall. It remained part of the estate until 1840s, when it was purchased for the construction of "Britannia Park" by the Chester and Holyhead Railway. The construction of the nearby Britannia Bridge took place directly to the northwest of Treborth, which was also constructed by the Chester and Holyhead Railway in 1852.

== Transport ==
Treborth was served by its own railway station on the Bangor and Carnarvon Railway. It was opened in 1854 and closed in 1959. The line between Bangor and Caernarfon closed in 1972.

== Present day ==
Treborth today is part of the Pentir community ward. It is home to the Treborth Playing Fields and a 3G football pitch.
