= Griffith's Crossing railway station =

Disused railway station in Gwynedd, Wales

Griffith's Crossing
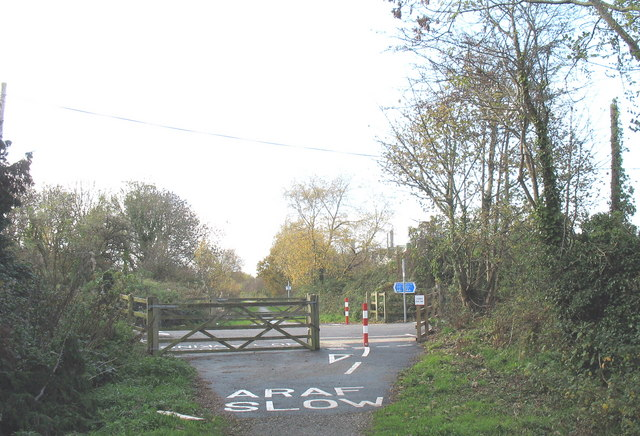
- In 2006, the line is now a cyclepath

General information
- Location: Port Dinorwic, Gwynedd; Wales
- Coordinates: 53.167797°N 4.238651°W
- Grid reference: SH504657
- Platforms: 1 originally; 2 from 1872

Other information
- Status: Disused

History
- Original company: Bangor and Carnarvon Railway
- Pre-grouping: London and North Western Railway
- Post-grouping: London, Midland and Scottish Railway

Key dates
- June 1854: Opened
- 5 July 1937: Closed to passengers
- 6 July 1964: Closed to goods traffic
Location

Griffith's Crossing railway station was a former railway station located on the Bangor and Carnarvon Railway about a mile and a half south west of Port Dinorwic (now Y Felinheli), Gwynedd, Wales. It was opened in June 1854 with one platform and a single storey station building made of local stone with a booking office and waiting room. When the line was doubled in 1872, a second platform was constructed with a simple waiting shelter on it, made of similar materials to the main building. The two 320 ft platforms were connected by a level crossing. To the west was a small siding with a ramp.

The station closed to passengers on 5 July 1937 when the platform and station buildings were demolished. Goods traffic continued to use it until 6 July 1964.

On 13 November 1911 the royal train stopped at the station and its passengers embarked in order to travel to Caernarfon Castle so that the future Edward VIII could be invested as Prince of Wales. For the event additional temporary wooden buildings were erected and a canopy put up. The royal train stopped near the station again on 1 July 1969 for the investiture of Charles, Prince of Wales. By this time, as the station was closed and demolished, a temporary platform and buildings were erected.

The site of the station was partly covered following the improvement and widening of the A487. However the station master's house still stands.

Preceding station	Historical railways	Following station
Port Dinorwic	Bangor and Carnarvon Railway	Caernarvon
