= Rhosbodrual =

Coordinates: 53.142616°N 4.249529°W

Rhosbodrual: Welsh: Rhosbodrual
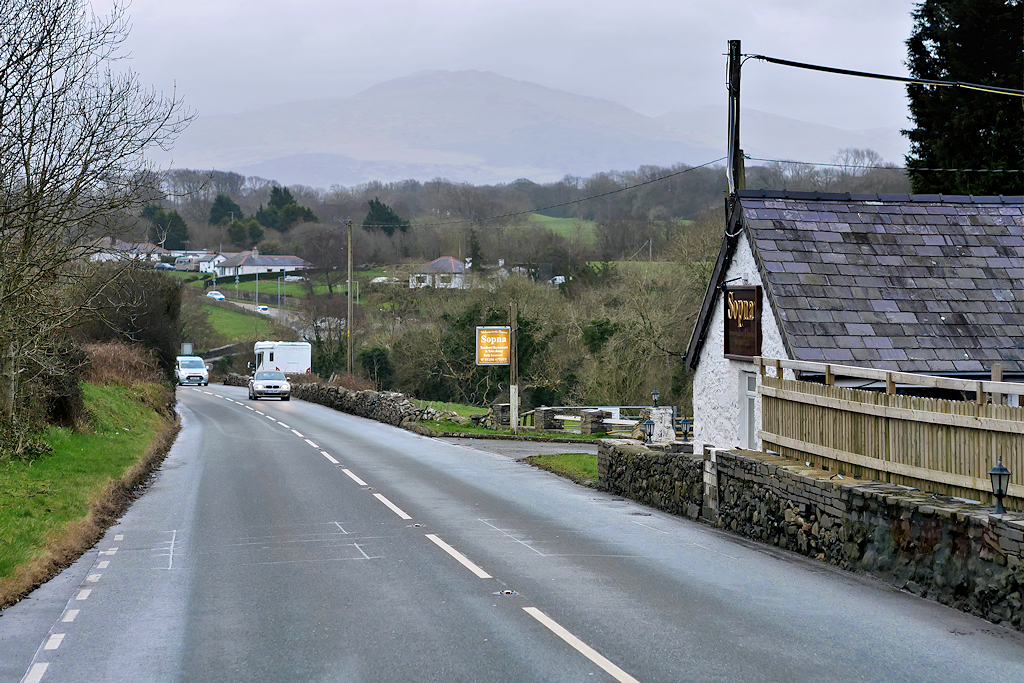
- Llanberis Road, Rhosbodrual

- Location within Gwynedd
- Community: Caernarfon
- Principal area: Gwynedd
- Country: Wales
- Sovereign state: United Kingdom
- Post town: Caernarfon
- Police: North Wales
- Fire: North Wales
- Ambulance: Welsh
- UK Parliament: Ynys Môn
- Senedd Cymru – Welsh Parliament: Ynys Môn

Rhosbodrual is a hamlet and area of Caernarfon in Gwynedd, Wales. It lies between Caernarfon and Llanberis. The hamlet was historically part of the historic county of Caernarfonshire.

== History ==
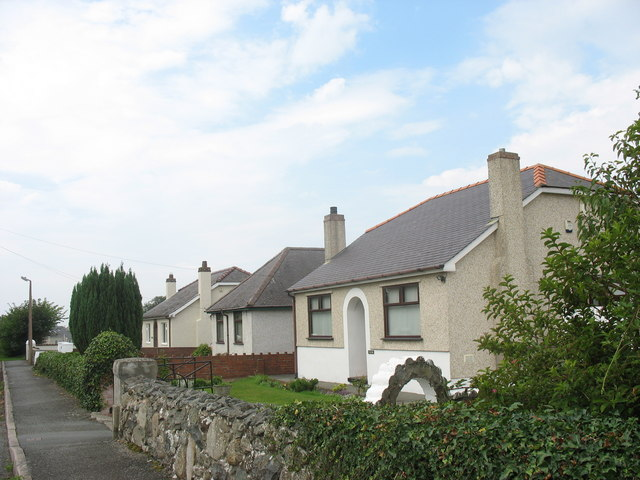
Older style bungalows on Cae Garw Road in Rhosbodrual

Rhosbodural remains a rural hamlet in the community of Caernarfon. In 2022, the local Indian Restaurant called the "Sopna Tandoori Restaurant" on Llanberis Road was awarded the 2022 Asian Restaurants Rewards. As a result was classed as the best in Wales during that year.

The hamlet is popular with tourists and holiday makers due to its many converted properties, as well as its proximity to Snowdon, Snowdonia, Llanberis Lake Railway, Caernarfon Castle, Anglesey and Bangor.

== Transport ==
The hamlet is served by regular bus services between Caernarfon, Llanberis, Betws-y-Coed and Bangor. Buses are operated by Gwynfor Coaches.

== See also ==
- List of localities in Wales by population
