= Caernarfon =

Town and community in Gwynedd, Wales

- Royal town and community
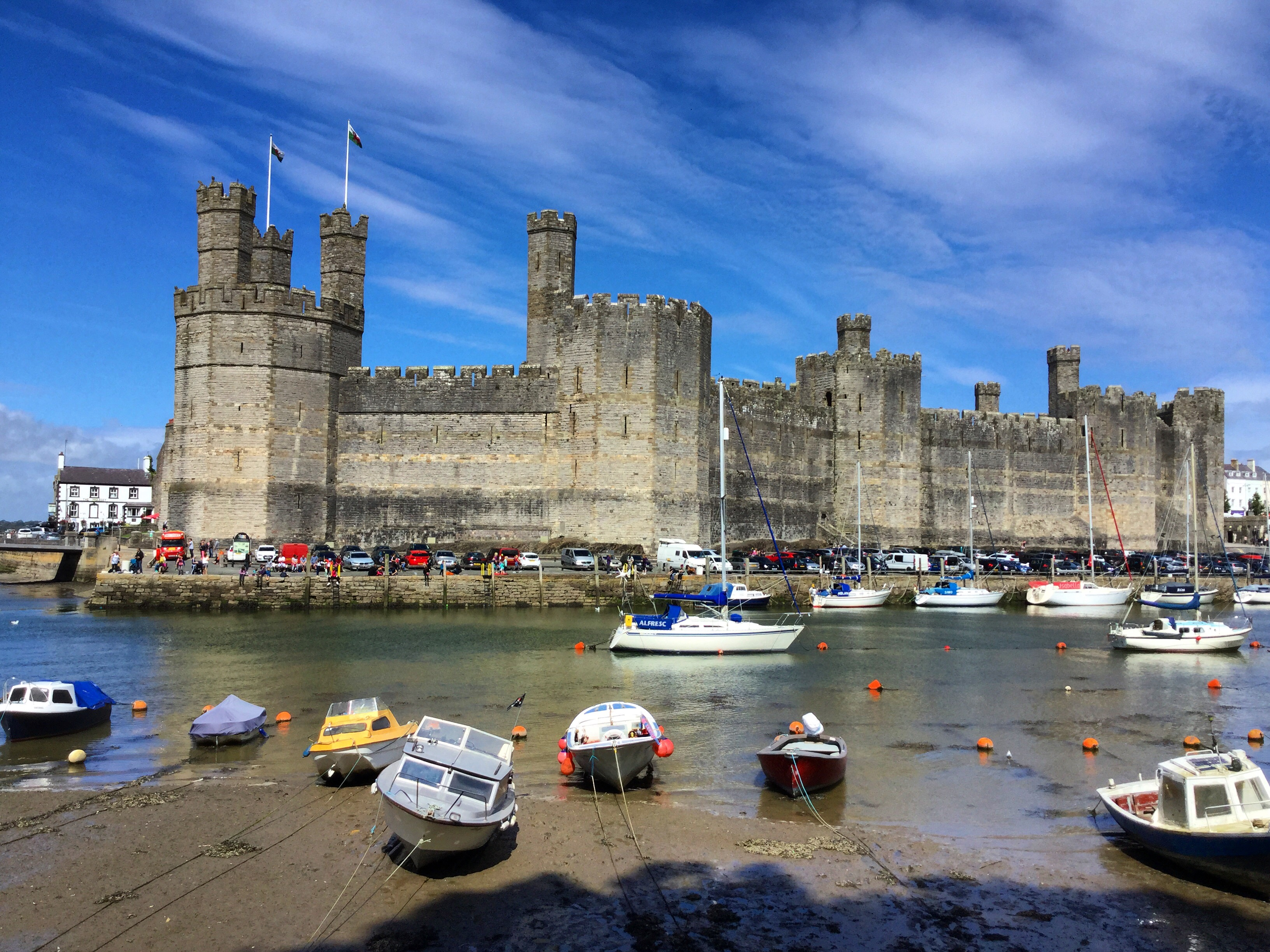
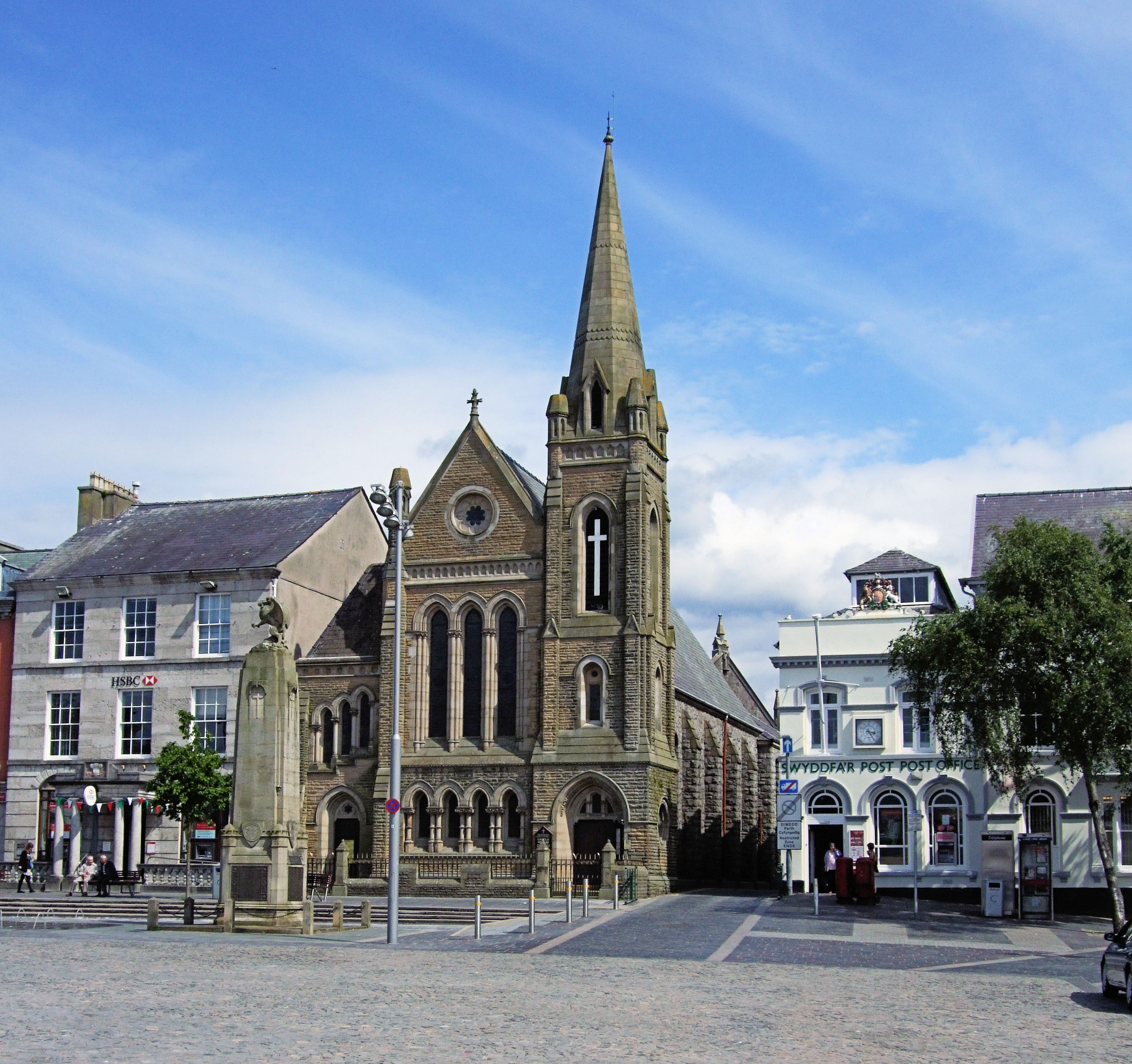
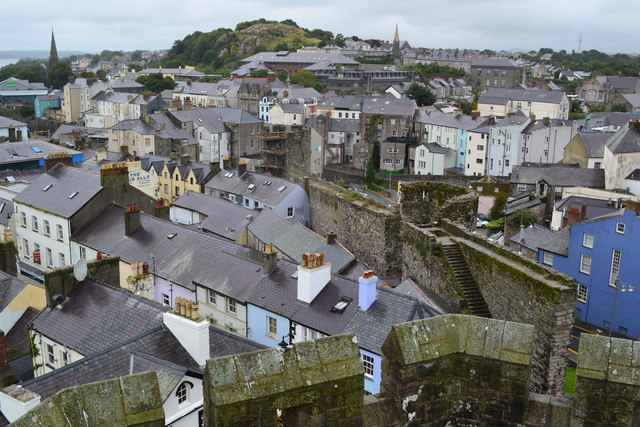
- From the top: Caernarfon Castle, Presbyterian Church in Wales and Town Walls and skyline

- Location within Gwynedd
- Demonym: Cofi
- OS grid reference: SH485625
  - Cardiff: 171 mi (275 km)
- Community: Caernarfon
- Principal area: Gwynedd
- Preserved county: Gwynedd
- Country: Wales
- Sovereign state: United Kingdom
- Areas of the town: List: Menai; Peblig; Port Waterloo; Rhosbodrual
- Post town: CAERNARFON
- Postcode district: LL54, LL55
- Dialling code: 01286
- Police: North Wales
- Fire: North Wales
- Ambulance: Welsh
- UK Parliament: Dwyfor Meirionnydd
- Senedd Cymru – Welsh Parliament: Gwynedd Maldwyn
- List of places UK Wales Gwynedd 53.14°N 4.27°W Map of the community

Caernarfon (/kərˈnɑːrvən, kɑːr-/; Welsh: [kaɨrˈnarvɔn]) (Note: Previously anglicised as "Carnarvon" and "Caernarvon") is a royal town, community and port, in Gwynedd, Wales. The community (which includes Caeathro) has a population of 9,852. It lies along the A4871 road, on the eastern shore of the Menai Strait, opposite the island of Anglesey. Bangor is 9 miles (14 km) to the north-east, Porthmadog is 20 miles (32 km) southeast and Holyhead is 29 miles (47 km) northwest, via the Britannia Bridge. Snowdonia (Eryri) is located to the east and south-east of the town. The town is the historic county town of Caernarfonshire.

Abundant natural resources in and around the Menai Strait enabled human habitation in prehistoric Britain. The Ordovices, a Celtic tribe, lived in the region during the period known as Roman Britain. The Roman fort Segontium was established around AD 80 to subjugate the Ordovices during the Roman conquest of Britain. The Romans occupied the region until the end of Roman rule in Britain in 382, after which Caernarfon became part of the Kingdom of Gwynedd. In the late 11th century, William the Conqueror ordered the construction of a motte-and-bailey castle at Caernarfon as part of the Norman invasion of Wales. He was unsuccessful, and Wales remained independent until around 1283.

In the 13th century, Llywelyn ap Gruffudd, ruler of Gwynedd, refused to pay homage to Edward I of England, prompting the English conquest of Gwynedd. This was followed by the construction of Caernarfon Castle, one of the largest and most imposing fortifications built by the English in Wales. In 1284, the English-style county of Caernarfonshire was established by the Statute of Rhuddlan; the same year, Caernarfon was made a borough, a county and market town, and the seat of English government in north Wales.

The ascent of the Welsh House of Tudor to the throne of England eased hostilities with the English and resulted in Caernarfon Castle falling into a state of disrepair. The town has flourished, leading to its status as a major tourist centre and seat of Gwynedd Council, with a thriving harbour and marina. Caernarfon has expanded beyond its medieval walls and experienced heavy suburbanisation. The community of Caernarfon's population includes the highest percentage of Welsh-speaking citizens anywhere in Wales. The status of Royal Borough was granted by Queen Elizabeth II in 1963 and amended to Royal Town in 1974. The castle and town walls are part of a World Heritage Site described as the Castles and Town Walls of King Edward in Gwynedd.

== Toponymy ==
The town's name consists of three elements: caer, yn, and Arfon. "Caer" means "fortress", in this case either the Roman fort of Segontium, which lies on the outskirts of the modern town, or the Norman castle erected near the mouth of the Afon Seiont. "Arfon" means "opposite Môn (Anglesey)", and the full name therefore means "the fortress in the land opposite Anglesey".

The earlier British and Romano-British settlement at Segontium was named Cair Segeint ("Fort Seiont") after the river. It was also known as Cair Custoient ("Fortress of Constantine"), after a belief that it was the capital of Gwynedd under Constantine, a supposed son of Saint Elen and the Emperor Magnus Maximus. Both names appear in the Historia Brittonum traditionally ascribed to Nennius. A medieval romance about Maximus and Elen, Macsen's Dream, calls her home Caer Aber Sein ("Fort Seiontmouth" or "the fortress at the mouth of the Seiont") and other pre-conquest poets such as Hywel ab Owain Gwynedd used the name Caer Gystennin. A 1221 charter by Llywelyn the Great to the canons of Penmon priory on Anglesey mentions Kaerinarfon, and the Welsh chronicle Brut y Tywysogion mentions both Kaerenarvon and Caerenarvon.

The town and the county named after it were officially spelled "Carnarvon" until 1926. At a meeting on 10 November 1925 the borough council resolved to ask the county council to change the spelling to "Caernarvon". The county council gave permission for the change of spelling for the name of the borough with effect from 14 January 1926, and at the same time decided to ask the government to also change the spelling of the county's name to Caernarvon. The government confirmed the change in the spelling of the county's name with effect from 1 July 1926.

The municipal borough was designated a royal borough in 1963. When the borough was abolished in 1974 the status of "royal town" was granted to the new community which succeeded it. The spelling of both borough and county remained "Caernarvon" until they were abolished in 1974. The spelling of the community's name was changed from "Caernarvon" to "Caernarfon" with effect from 2 June 1975 by order of Arfon Borough Council.

== History ==
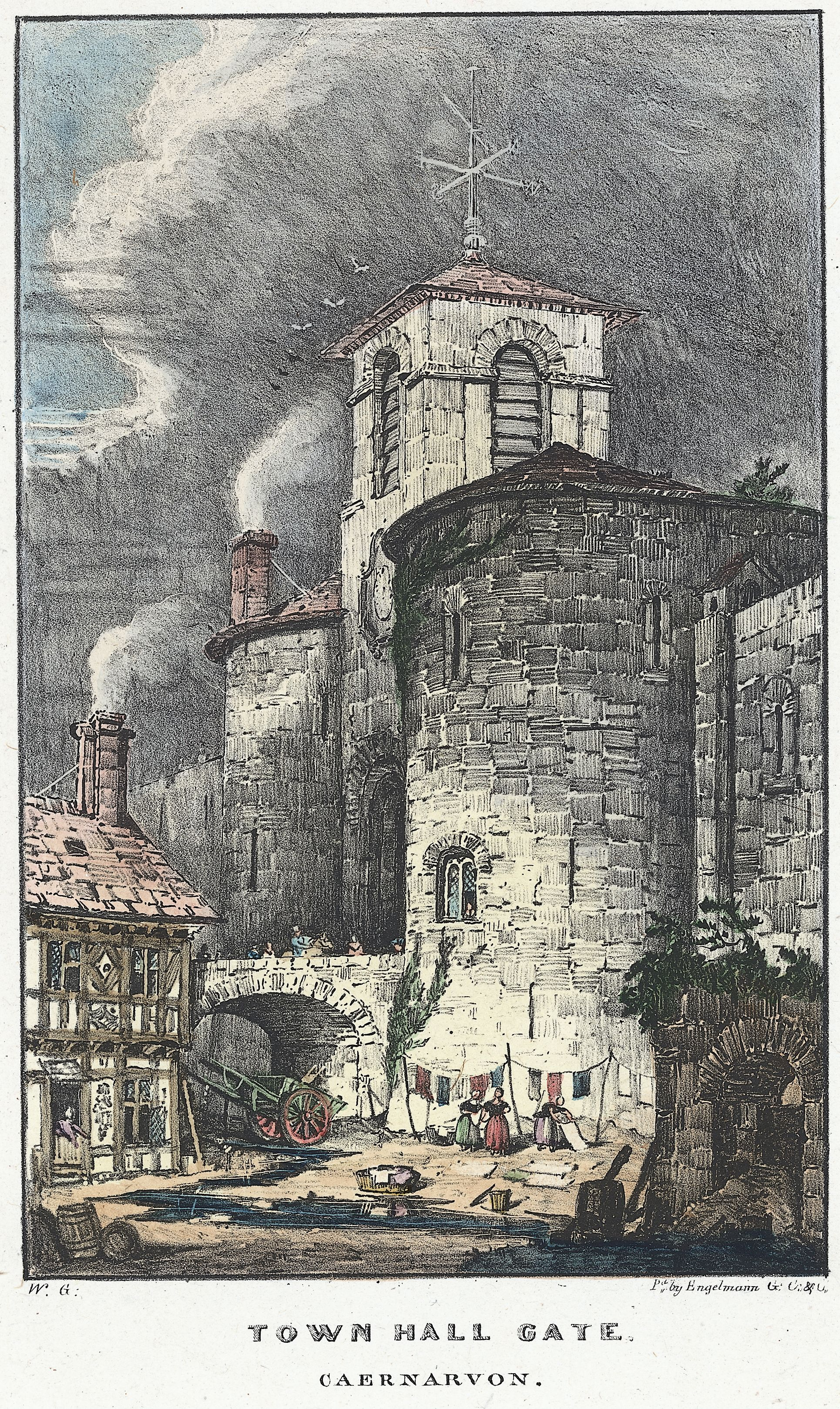
Town Hall gate c. 1840

Caernarfon contains a Roman fort, Segontium, and a Norman motte-and-bailey castle was built at the mouth of the River Seiont.

In 1283, King Edward I completed his conquest of Wales which he secured by a chain of castles and walled towns. The construction of a new stone Caernarfon Castle seems to have started as soon as the campaign had finished. Edward's architect, James of St. George, may well have modelled the castle on the walls of Constantinople, possibly being aware of the town's legendary associations. Edward's fourth son, Edward of Caernarfon, later Edward II of England, was born at the castle in April 1284 and made Prince of Wales in 1301. A story recorded in the 16th century suggests that the new prince was offered to the native Welsh on the premise "that [he] was borne in Wales and could speake never a word of English", however, there is no contemporary evidence to support this.

Caernarfon was constituted a borough in 1284 by a charter of Edward I. The charter, which was confirmed on a number of occasions, appointed the mayor of the borough Constable of the Castle ex officio.

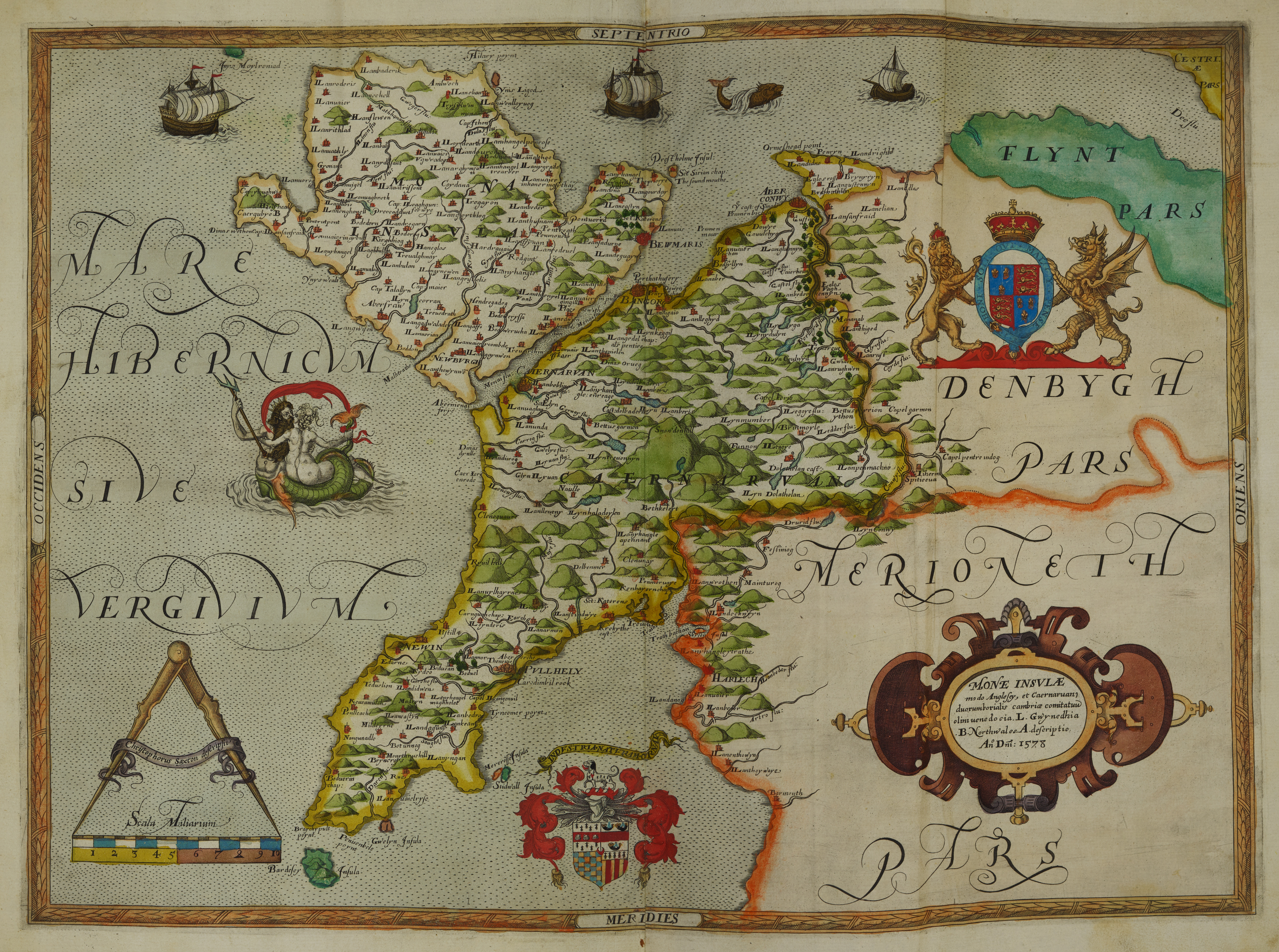
Hand-drawn map of Anglesey and Caernarfon by Christopher Saxton from 1578

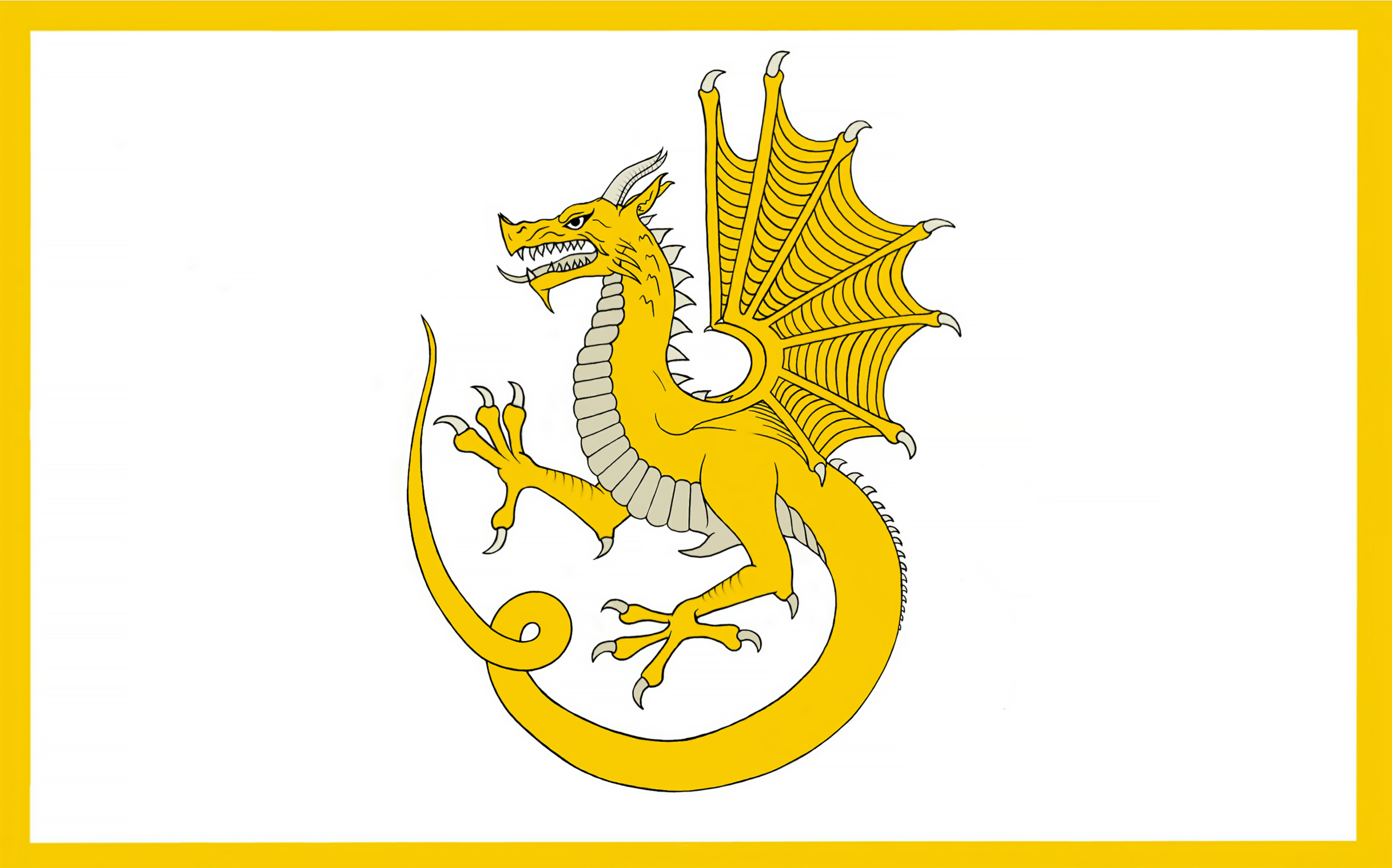
On 2 November 1401, 'Y Ddraig Aur' (The golden dragon) of Owain Glyndŵr was attested to have been flown during the Battle of Tuthill at Caernarfon, it is also likely that it was also flown throughout the Welsh independence campaign.

In 1911, David Lloyd George, then Member of Parliament (MP) for Caernarfon boroughs, which included various towns from Llŷn to Conwy, agreed to the British royal family's idea of holding the investiture of the Prince of Wales at Caernarfon Castle. The ceremony took place on 13 July, with the royal family visiting Wales, and the future Edward VIII was duly invested.

In 1955, Caernarfon was in the running for the title of Capital of Wales on historical grounds but the town's campaign was heavily defeated in a ballot of Welsh local authorities, with 11 votes compared to Cardiff's 136. Cardiff therefore became the Welsh capital.

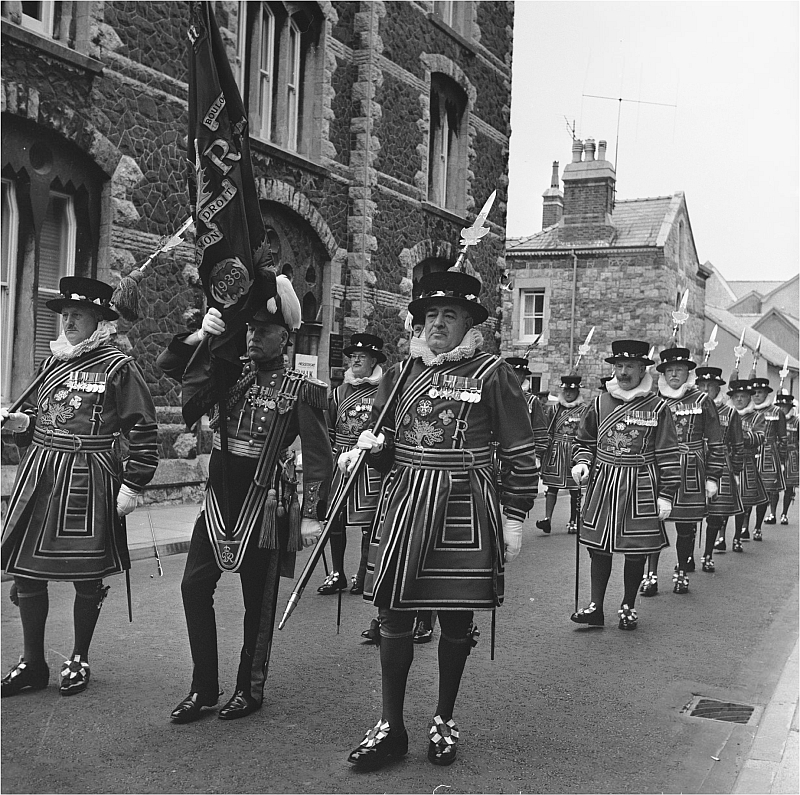
Scene in Caernarfon on Investiture day 1969.

On 1 July 1969, the investiture ceremony for Charles, Prince of Wales was again held at Caernarfon Castle. The ceremony went ahead without incident despite terrorist threats and protests, which culminated in the death of two members of Mudiad Amddiffyn Cymru (Welsh Defence Movement), Alwyn Jones and George Taylor, who were killed when their bomb – intended for the railway line at Abergele in order to stop the British Royal Train – exploded prematurely. The bombing campaign (one in Abergele, two in Caernarfon and finally one on Llandudno Pier) was organised by the movement's leader, John Jenkins. He was later arrested after a tip-off and was sentenced to ten years imprisonment.

In July 2019, Caernarfon hosted a rally for Welsh independence. The event, organised by AUOB (All Under One Banner) Cymru, included a march through the town centre. Organisers estimated that roughly 8,000 people joined the march on the town square; local authorities confirmed at least 5,000 attendees. The event featured a number of speakers including Hardeep Singh Kohli, Evra Rose, Dafydd Iwan, Lleuwen Steffan, Siôn Jobbins, Beth Angell, Gwion Hallam, Meleri Davies and Elfed Wyn Jones. Talks covered criticism of Brexit and Westminster with advocating Welsh Independence.

The history of Caernarfon, as an example where the rise and fall of different civilizations can be seen from one hilltop, is discussed in John Michael Greer's book The Long Descent. He writes of Caernarfon:

Spread out below us in an unexpected glory of sunlight was the whole recorded history of that little corner of the world. The ground beneath us still rippled with earthworks from the Celtic hill fort that guarded the Menai Strait more than two and a half millennia ago. The Roman fort that replaced it was now the dim brown mark of an old archaeological site on low hills off to the left. Edward I's great grey castle rose up in the middle foreground, and the high contrails of RAF jets on a training exercise out over the Irish Sea showed that the town's current overlords still maintained the old watch. Houses and shops from more than half a dozen centuries spread eastward as they rose through the waters of time, from the cramped medieval buildings of the old castle town straight ahead to the gaudy sign and sprawling parking lot of the supermarket back behind us.

== Geography ==
Caernarfon is situated on the southern bank of the Menai Strait facing the Isle of Anglesey. It is situated 9 miles (14 km) south-west of Bangor, 20 miles (32 km) north of Porthmadog and approximately 8 miles (13 km) west of Llanberis and Snowdonia National Park. The mouth of the River Seiont is in the town, creating a natural harbour where it flows into the Menai Strait. Caernarfon Castle stands at the mouth of the river. The A487 passes directly through Caernarfon, with Bangor to the north and Porthmadog to the south.

== Economy ==
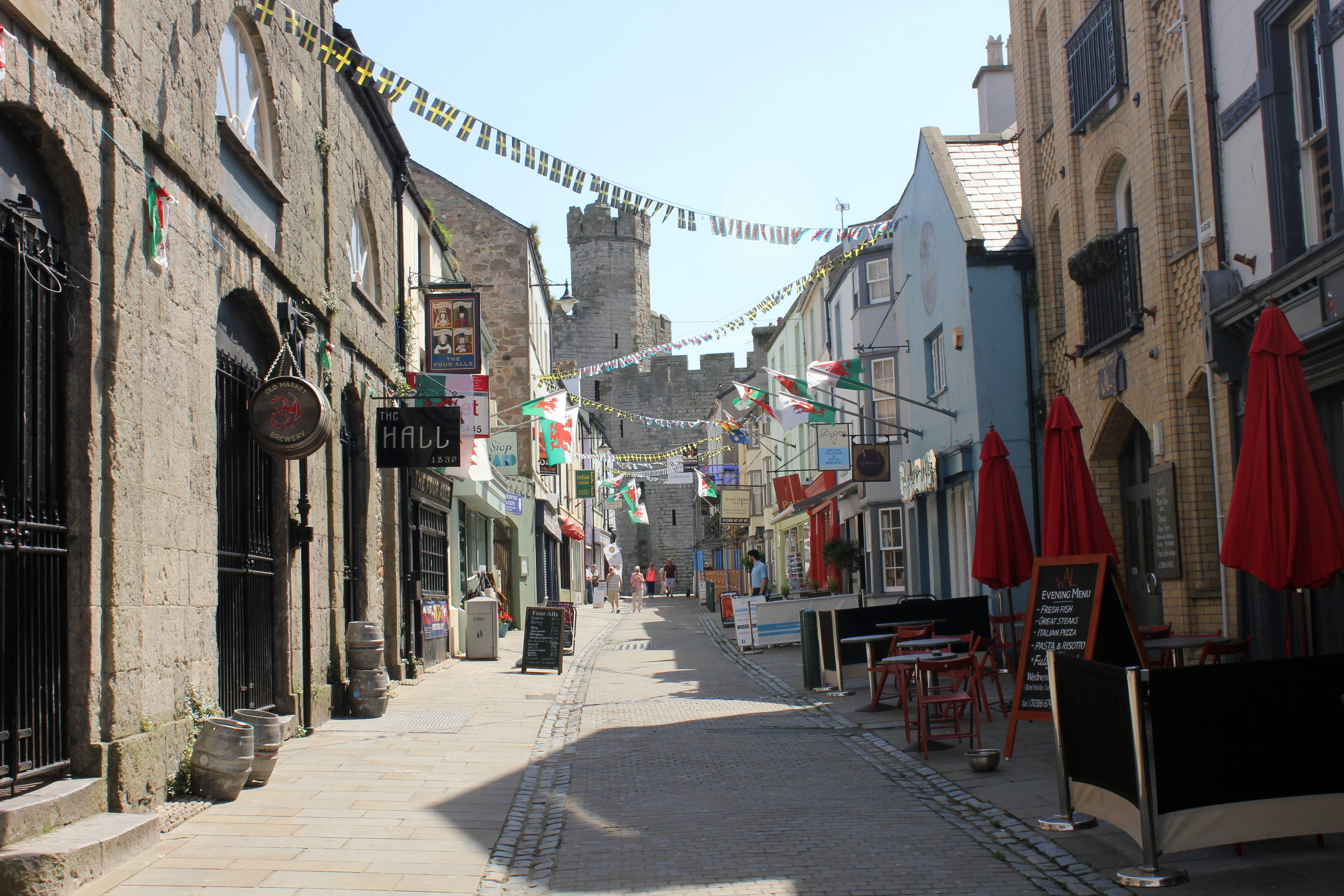
Palace Street, leading to the castle, with the Old Market Hall on the left

Caernarfon's historical prominence and landmarks have made it a major tourist centre. As a result, many of the local businesses cater for the tourist trade. Caernarfon has numerous guest houses, inns and pubs, hotels, restaurants and shops. The majority of shops in the town are located either in the centre of town around Pool Street and Castle Square (Y Maes), on Doc Fictoria (Victoria Dock) or in Cei Llechi (Slate Quay). A number of shops are also located within the Town Walls.

The majority of the retail and residential section of Doc Fictoria was opened in 2008. The retail and residential section of Doc Fictoria is built directly beside a Blue Flag beach marina. It contains numerous homes, bars and bistros, cafés and restaurants, an award-winning arts centre, a maritime museum and a range of shops and stores.

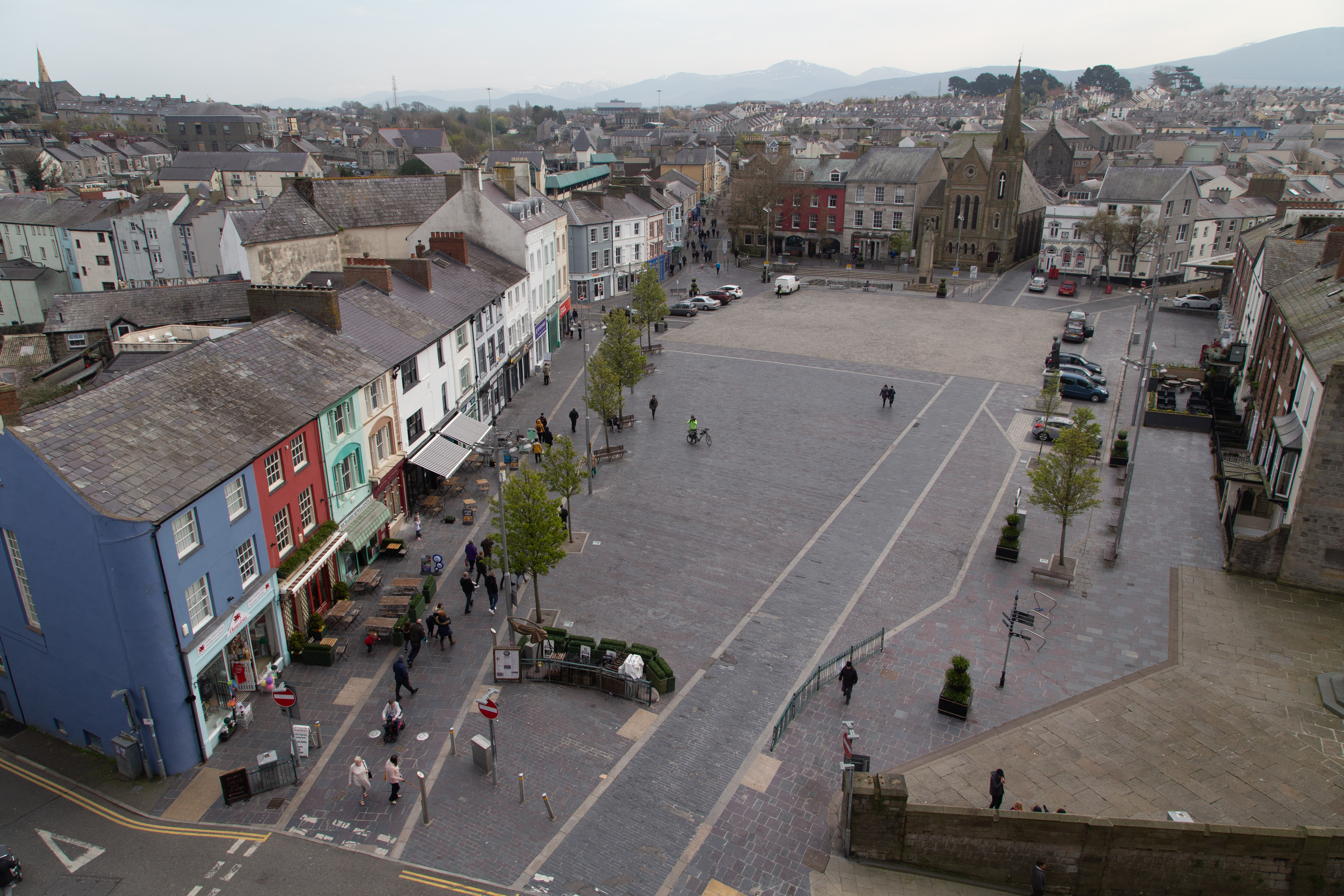
Y Maes (Castle Square), seen from the castle walls

Pool Street and Castle Square contain a number of large, national retail shops and smaller independent stores. Pool Street is pedestrianised and serves as the town's main shopping street. Castle Square, commonly referred to as the 'Maes' by both Welsh and English speakers, is the market square of the town. A market is held every Saturday throughout the year and also on Mondays in the summer. The square was revamped at a cost of £2.4 million in 2009. However, since its revamp the square has caused controversy due to traffic and parking difficulties. During the revamp, it was decided to remove barriers between traffic and pedestrians creating a 'shared space', to force drivers to be more considerate of pedestrians and other vehicles. This is the first use of this kind of arrangement in Wales, but it has been described by councillor Bob Anderson as being 'too ambiguous' for road users. Another controversy caused by the revamp of the Maes was that a historic old oak tree was taken down from outside the HSBC bank. When the Maes was re-opened in July 2009 by the local politician and Heritage Minister of Wales, Alun Ffred Jones AM, he said, "the use of beautiful local slate is very prominent in the new Maes."

There are many old public houses serving the town, including The Four Alls, The Anglesey Arms Hotel, The Castle Hotel, The Crown, Morgan Lloyd, Pen Deitch and The Twthill Vaults. The oldest public house in Caernarfon is the Black Boy Inn, which remained in the same family for over 40 years until sold in 2003 to a local independent family business. The pub has stood inside Caernarfon's Town Walls since the 16th century, and many people claim to have seen ghosts within the building.

In and around the Town Walls are numerous restaurants, public houses and inns, and guest houses and hostels.

== Governance ==
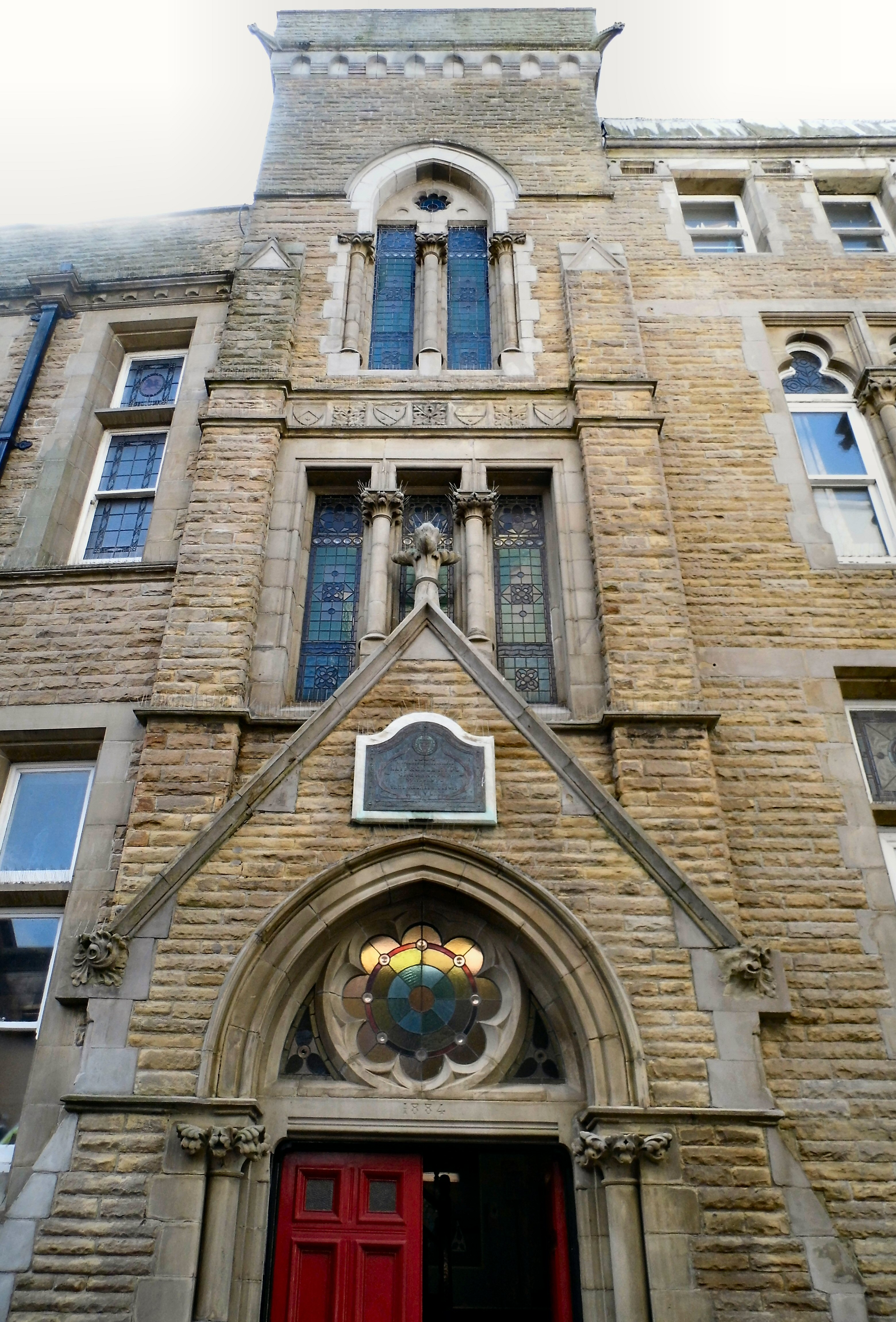
The Institute Building: headquarters of Caernarfon Town Council.

There are two tiers of local government covering Caernarfon, at community (town) and county level: Caernarfon Town Council (Cyngor Tref Caernarfon) and Gwynedd Council (Cyngor Gwynedd). The town council is based at the Institute Building on Pavilion Hill (Allt Pafiliwn). As a royal town, the town council is allowed to style itself Caernarfon Royal Town Council (Cyngor Tref Frenhinol Caernarfon), which names it has used in the past, but as at 2024 it does not do so on its website or in council minutes. Gwynedd Council also has its headquarters in the town at the Council Offices on Shirehall Street.

The Caernarfon parliamentary constituency was a former electoral area centred on Caernarfon. Caernarfon is now part of the constituency of Dwyfor Meirionnydd in the UK Parliament, and Arfon in the Senedd. The town is twinned with Landerneau in Brittany, and Trelew in Chubut Province, Patagonia.

=== Administrative history ===
Caernarfon formed part of the ancient parish of Llanbeblig. The parish also included adjoining rural areas, particularly to the south-east where it extended to include the village of Waunfawr. The parish church was St Peblig's Church, to the south-east of the walled town. The church stood in relative isolation until the 20th century, but has since been surrounded by the town's suburbs.

As part of establishing the castle and fortified town, Edward I of England granted Caernarfon a charter making it a borough in 1284. The Statute of Rhuddlan in the same year created the new county of Caernarfonshire, with Caernarfon serving as county town.

In 1836 Caernarfon became a municipal borough under the Municipal Corporations Act 1835, which standardised how most boroughs operated across the country. The Local Government Act 1894 directed that parishes were no longer allowed to straddle borough boundaries, and so the part of the parish of Llanbeblig outside the borough became the separate parish of Waunfawr (initially spelt Waenfawr).

The municipal borough of Caernarfon was abolished in 1974 under the Local Government Act 1972. A community called Caernarfon was created instead, covering the area of the abolished borough. District-level functions passed to Arfon Borough Council, which was in turn replaced in 1996 by Gwynedd Council.

== Demography ==
The population in 1841 was 8,001.

The population of Caernarfon Community Parish in 2001 was 9,611. Caernarfon residents are known colloquially as "Cofis". The word "Cofi" /ˈkɒvi/ is also used locally in Caernarfon to describe the local Welsh dialect, notable for a number of words not in use elsewhere.

Within Wales, Gwynedd has the highest proportion of speakers of the Welsh language. The greatest concentration of Welsh speakers in Gwynedd is found in and around Caernarfon.

According to the 2011 census, 85.8% of residents were born in Wales, one of the highest proportions in Gwynedd, and 77.0% reported a "Welsh only" national identity.

== Churches ==
=== St Peblig's and Segontium Roman Fort ===
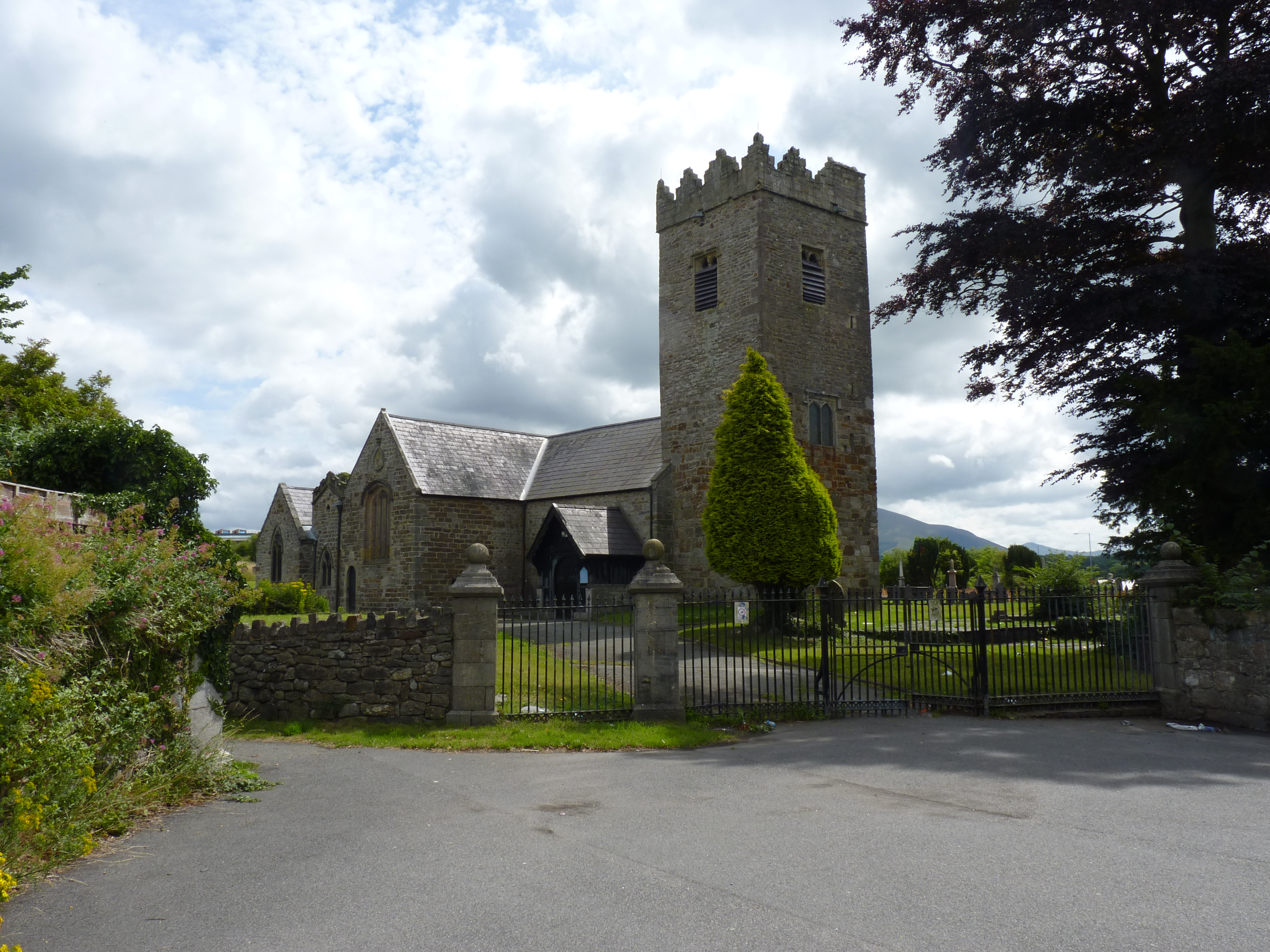
St Peblig's Church

Caernarfon historically formed part of the parish of Llanbeblig, named after Saint Peblig, the son of Saint Elen and Macsen Wledig (Magnus Maximus). St Peblig's Church stands 0.6 miles (0.97 km) south-east of the walled town. It is built on an important early Christian site, itself built on a Roman Mithraeum or temple of Mithras. This was located close to the Segontium Roman Fort which lies 200 metres (660 feet) away. A Roman altar was found in one of the walls of the church during 19th-century restoration work. The present church dates mainly from the 14th century and is built to a Cruciform architectural plan. A major restoration was undertaken in 1894. St Peblig's is a Grade I listed building.

=== St Mary's ===
St Mary's Church was begun in 1307 as a chapel for the castle and garrison. It is built against the town wall, the Bell Tower acting as a vestry. The church was restored by Benjamin Dean Wyatt in 1811-1814. The exterior mainly reflects Wyatt's work, except its north and west walls which are "Master James of St George's massive limestone masonry of 1284-1290", but the arcades in the nave, and other internal elements, are medieval. The church is a Grade I listed building.

== Landmarks ==
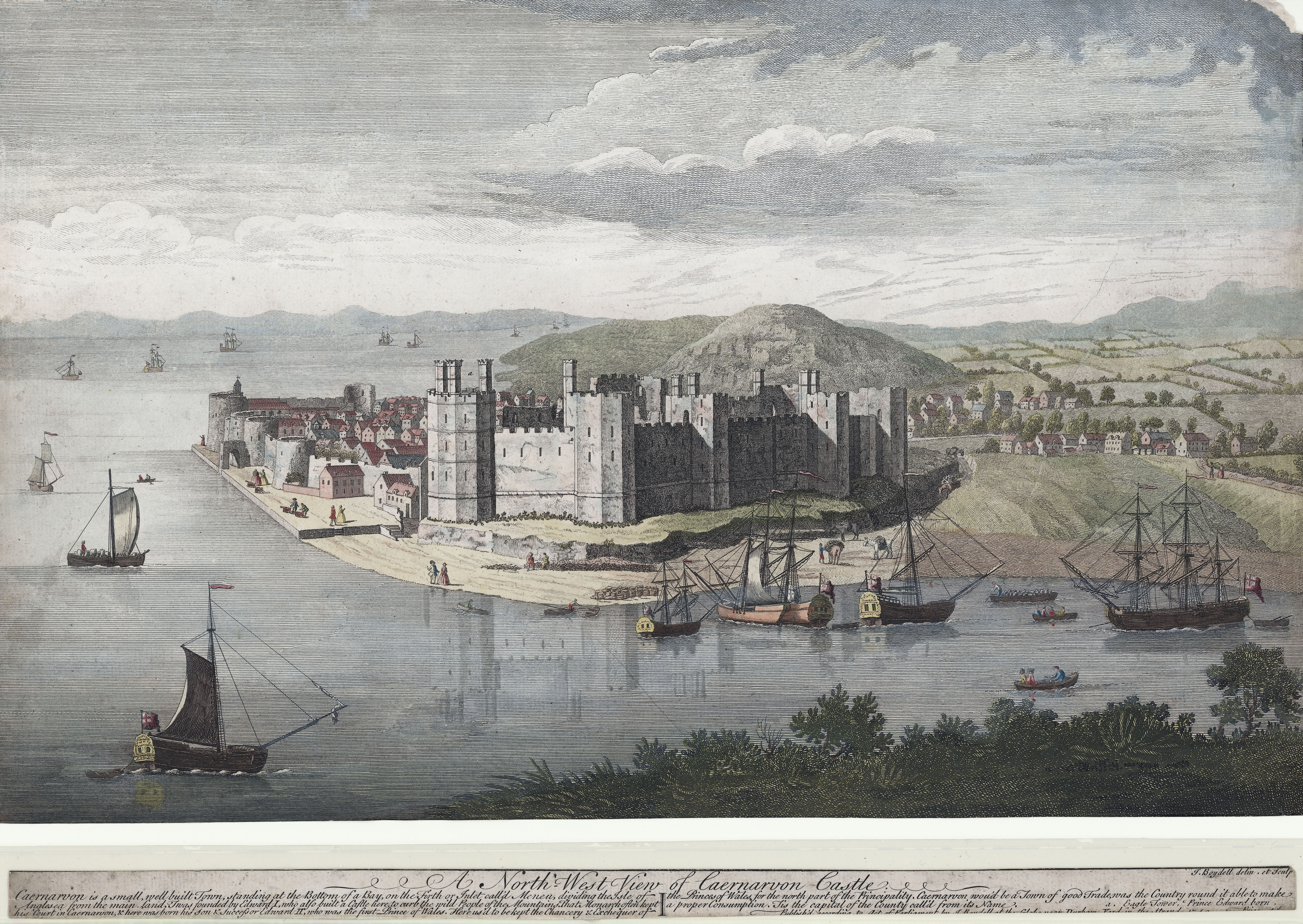
A north-west view of Caernarvon Castle. 1749

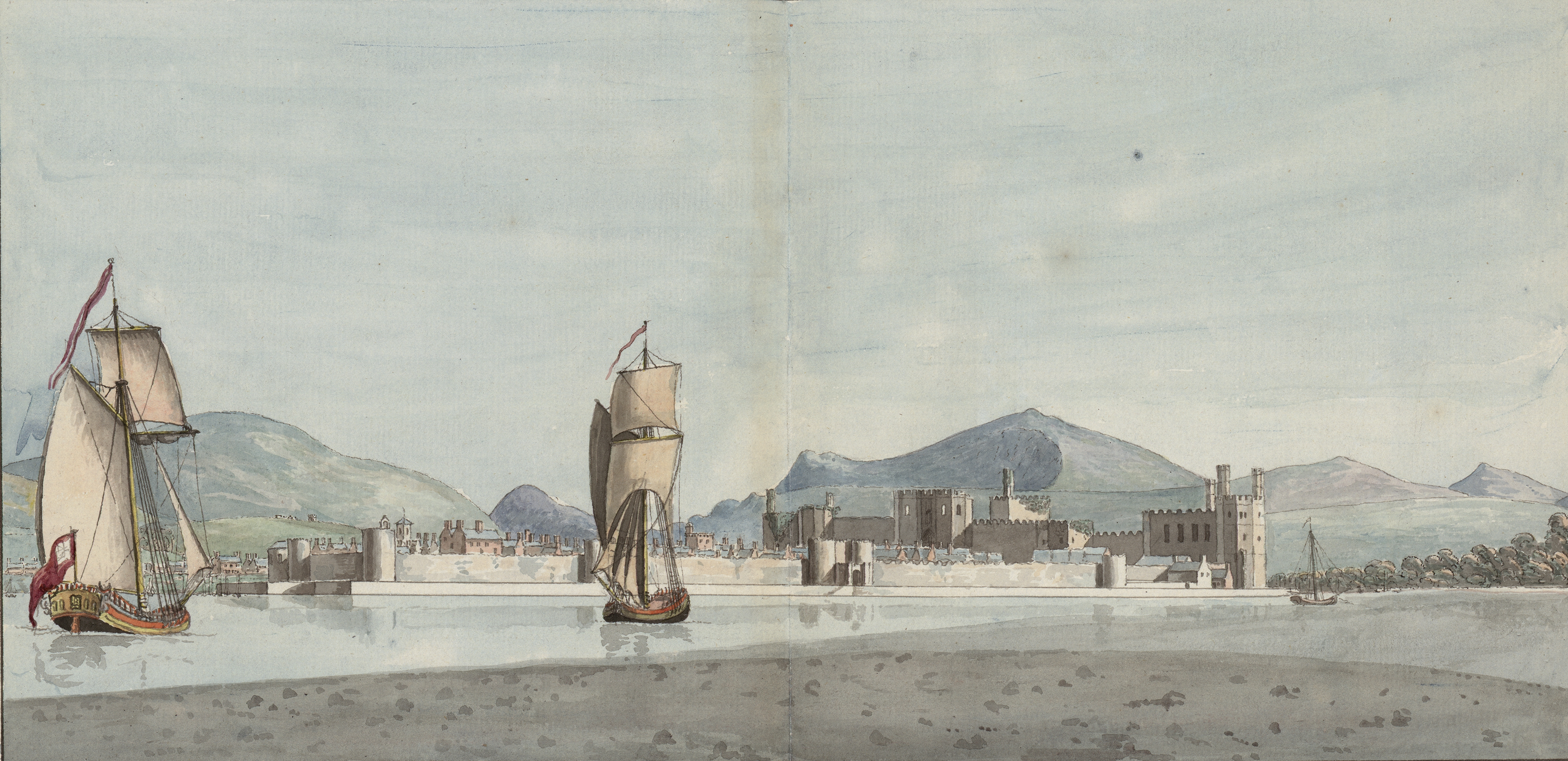
A view of the town walls, c. 1781 (by Moses Griffith)

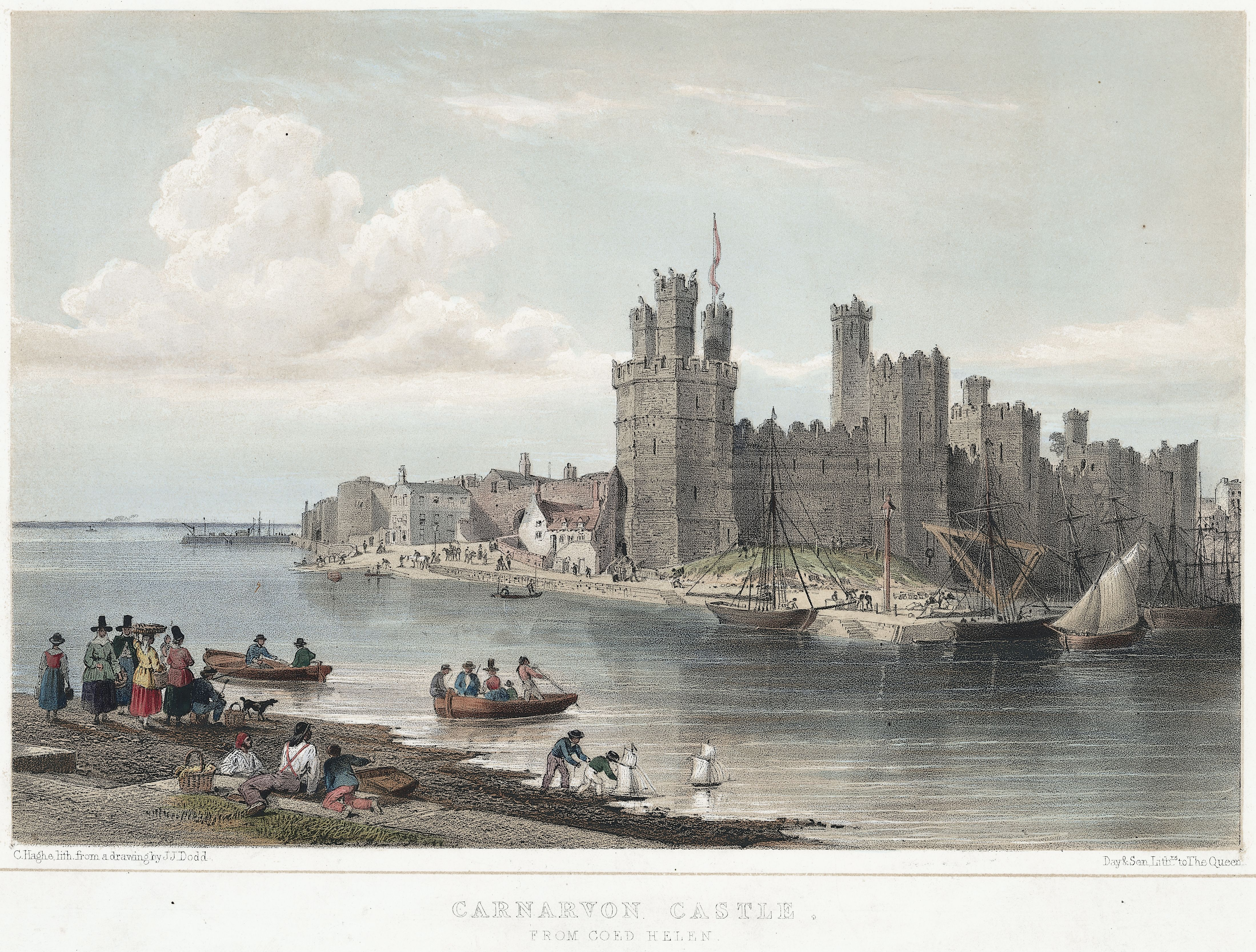
Carnarvon Castle from Coed Helen, 1854

=== Caernarfon Castle ===
The present castle building was constructed between 1283 and 1330 by the order of King Edward I. The banded stonework and polygonal towers are thought to have been in imitation of the Walls of Constantinople. The impressive curtain wall with nine towers and two gatehouses survive largely intact. Caernarfon Castle is now under the care of Cadw and is open to the public. The castle includes the regimental museum of the Royal Welch Fusiliers.

=== Caernarfon town walls ===
The medieval town walls, including eight towers and two twin-towered gateways, form a complete circuit of 800 yards (730 m) around the old town and were built between 1283 and 1285. The walls are in the care of Cadw but only a small section is accessible to the public. The town walls and castle at Caernarfon were declared part of a World Heritage Site in 1986. According to UNESCO, the castle and walls together with other royal castles in Gwynedd "are the finest examples of late 13th century and early 14th century military architecture in Europe".

=== County Hall, police station and prison ===
Caernarfon County Hall and the police station are two former municipal buildings which stand on Castle Ditch, facing the castle walls. Constructed in the mid-19th century, they were designed by John Fisher, the Caernarfonshire county surveyor in a Neoclassical style. They are both Grade I listed buildings. In the 20th century the buildings were vacated. The courthouse was replaced by the new Caernarfon Criminal Justice Centre on the former Segontium School site in Llanberis Road in 2009. The former county hall now operates as an entertainment venue, and the former police station as commercial offices. Adjacent to the old courthouse is the former Caernarfon Gaol which also closed in the early 20th century and converted into council offices.

=== Statue of David Lloyd George ===
The statue in Castle Square was sculpted by W. Goscombe John and was erected in 1921 when Lloyd George was prime minister. David Lloyd George was the Member of Parliament for the area from 1890 to 1945.

=== The Old Market Hall ===
The Old Market Hall in Hole-in-the-Wall Street and Palace Street was built in 1832 as a corn market; the interior and roof were rebuilt later in that century. It is a Grade II listed building. It now acts as a pub and music venue.

=== Morfa Common Park ===
A small Victorian urban park, Morfa was laid out in 1888. It stands to the south of the town, bordered by the 'Ysbyty Eryri' hospital [see below] at its southern edge. It is listed at Grade II on the Cadw/ICOMOS Register of Parks and Gardens of Special Historic Interest in Wales.

=== Others ===
Caernarfon has a small hospital, 'Ysbyty Eryri' (Snowdonia Hospital). The nearest large regional hospital is Ysbyty Gwynedd, in Bangor.

Caernarfon Barracks was commissioned by John Lloyd, County Surveyor of Caernarfonshire, as a military headquarters and completed in 1855.

== Transport ==
=== Sea ===
Caernarfon was at one time an important port, exporting slate from the Dyffryn Nantlle quarries. This traffic was facilitated from 1828 by the Nantlle Railway which predated far more widely known ventures such as the Liverpool and Manchester Railway and the Ffestiniog Railway.

=== Rail ===
Five passenger stations have served the town. Caernarvon railway station opened in 1852 as the western terminus of the Bangor and Carnarvon Railway. This connected the town with the North Wales coast and the expanding national network. Carnarvon Castle railway station opened in 1856 as the northern passenger terminus of the 3ft 6in narrow gauge Nantlle Railway. This service ended in 1865 when the line being built from the south by the standard gauge Carnarvonshire Railway took over most of its trackbed. The Carnarvonshire Railway's temporary northern terminus was at Pant to the south of the town. Pant station opened in 1867. At the same time, the Carnarvon and Llanberis Railway built its line from Llanberis to Caernarfon. Its temporary western terminus was called Carnarvon (Morfa). It opened in 1869 near the modern road bridges over the Afon Seiont. For a short period, therefore, Caernarfon had three terminating stations on its edges. Records are contradictory, but this ended in either 1870 or 1871 when they were connected by a line through the town using the tunnel which survives, having been converted in 1995 for road traffic. When the through route was opened Pant and Morfa stations closed and the original station became the town's only station. The London and North Western Railway also took over all the lines mentioned, leaving one station and one service provider by 1871.

The services to Llanberis and south to Afon Wen closed progressively from the 1930s, with tracks being lifted in the mid-1960s, but Caernarvon station survived until 1970, with Bangor to Caernarvon one of the last passenger services to be closed under the Beeching Axe; it is now the site of a Morrisons supermarket. In November 2020 the Welsh Government stated 'further consideration' should be given to reopening the line. The fifth station was opened in 1997 on the old trackbed in St. Helen's Road. It is the northern terminus of the 2ft narrow gauge Rheilffordd Eryri / Welsh Highland Railway. Work began on a permanent station for the town in February 2017. The new station opened to passengers in the Spring of 2019. Heritage steam services provide links to Porthmadog, where passengers can change for services on the Ffestiniog Railway to Blaenau Ffestiniog.

=== Bus ===
Bus services in the town are provided by Arriva Buses Wales, and a number of smaller, local operators. Longer distance, cross-country services are operated by Lloyds Coaches, and connect the town with Bangor to the north, and Aberystwyth via Porthmadog, Dolgellau and Machynlleth to the south. These services are part of the Welsh Government funded TrawsCymru network.

=== Road ===
The A487 trunk road bisects the town, providing access to major urban areas along the North Wales coast and the Port of Holyhead, via the A55 expressway. Llanberis at the foot of Snowdon can be reached via the A4086, which heads east out of the town towards Capel Curig.

=== Bike ===
Heading north out of the town is the Lôn Las Menai cycle path to nearby Y Felinheli. Heading south out of the town is the Lôn Eifion cycle path, which leads to Bryncir, near Criccieth. The route provides views into the Snowdonia mountains, down along the Llŷn Peninsula and across to the Isle of Anglesey.

=== Air ===
Caernarfon Airport is 4.5 miles (7.2 km) to the southwest, and offers pleasure flights and an aviation museum.

=== Foot ===
The Aber Swing Bridge is a pedestrian swing bridge that crosses over the Afon Seiont to connect pedestrians from the foreshore to the Watergate entrance in the centre of Caernarfon by the Caernarfon Castle.

== Education ==
There are four primary schools in Caernarfon, Ysgol yr Hendre being the largest. The others are Ysgol y Gelli, Ysgol Santes Helen and Ysgol Maesincla. Ysgol Syr Hugh Owen is the single secondary school serving Caernarfon and the surrounding areas and currently has between 900 and 1000 pupils from ages 11 to 18. Ysgol Pendalar is a school for children with special needs. Coleg Menai is a further education college for adult learners.

== Notable people ==
See Category: People from Caernarfon

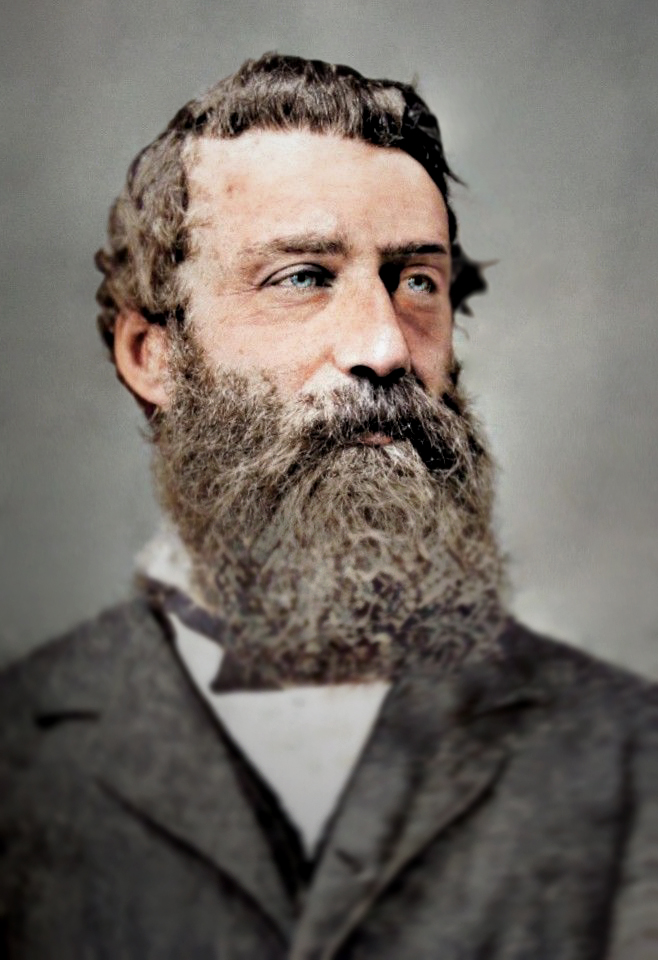
Lewis Jones, 1898

- Saint Elen, late 4th-century founder of churches in Wales.
- Edward II of England (1284–1327), King of England from 1307 to 1327.
- Lieutenant-General Charles Morgan, (1744 – 21 March 1818), served as Commander-in-Chief, India.
- Morris Williams (1809–1874), clergyman and writer, known by his bardic name Nicander
- William George Owen (1810–85), civil engineer, later Chief Engineer of the Great Western Railway
- Llewellyn Turner (1823-1903), deputy constable of Caernarfon Castle.
- William Henry Preece (1834–1913), an electrical engineer and inventor.
- Lewis Jones (1837-1904), one of the founders of the Welsh settlement in Patagonia.
- David Lloyd George (1863–1945), Prime Minister of the UK from 1916 to 1922.
- Gwilym Edwards (1881–1963), Presbyterian minister, writer and academic
- Lionel Rees (1884–1955), aviator, flying ace and recipient of the Victoria Cross
- Maureen Peters (1935–2008), an historical novelist
- Dafydd Wigley (born 1943), politician, MP for Caernarfon from 1974 until 2001
- Sian Eleri, BBC Radio 1 presenter
- Jamie Jones, DJ and producer

=== Sport ===
- Bryan Orritt (1937–2014), a professional footballer with over 370 club caps
- Barry Hughes (1937–2019), a professional footballer and manager, active primarily in the Netherlands
- Wyn Davies (born 1942), a footballer with 611 club caps and 34 for Wales
- Tom Walley (born 1945), footballer with over 410 club caps
- Catrin Thomas (born 1964), ski mountaineer and mountain climber
- Waynne Phillips (born 1970), a professional footballer with over 470 club caps
- Nathan Craig (born 1991), a professional footballer

== Sport ==
Caernarfon Town F.C. (Welsh: Clwb Pêl Droed Tref Caernarfon) is a Welsh football club based in the town, which currently plays in the Cymru Premier, the top level for football in Wales. The club is nicknamed "the Canaries" because of its yellow and green strip. Caernarfon Town plays at The Oval which has a capacity of 3000 people and 250 seated people.

== Culture ==
Caernarfon hosted the National Eisteddfod in 1862, 1894, 1906, 1921, 1935, 1959 and 1979. Unofficial National Eisteddfod events were also held there in 1877 and 1880. Caernarfon also hosted the 30th annual Celtic Media Festival in March 2009. Cultural destinations include Galeri and Oriel Pendeitsh. Galeri, which opened in 2004, is a creative enterprise centre that houses a gallery, a concert hall, a cinema, a number of companies, and a range of other creative and cultural spaces. Oriel Pendeitsh is a ground-floor exhibition space adjoining the Tourist Information Centre opposite Caernarfon Castle. The gallery has a varied and changing programme of exhibitions throughout the year.

== Food festival ==
The Caernarfon Food Festival takes place in the town's streets including The Slate Quay (Cei Llechi) and Castle Square (the Maes), which is pedestrianised for the event. Stalls are also located along the promenade next to the Menai Strait towards the marina and Doc Fictoria.

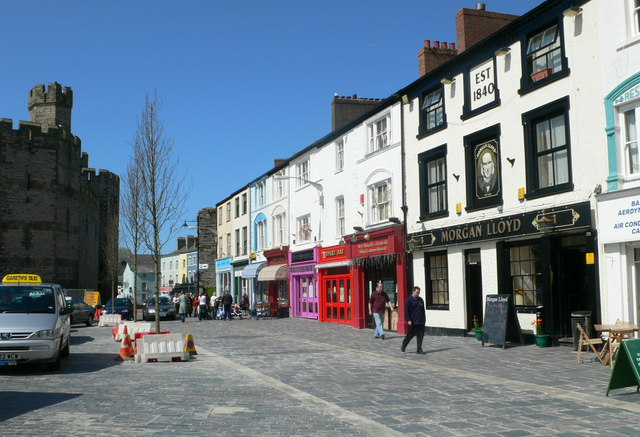
Shops on the Maes, Caernarfon

The festival was formed in 2015 as a result of public consultation within the town. The first festival was held in 2016. It is organised by the Caernarfon Food Festival Group which is made up of local volunteers who hold regular meetings to plan each festival. The festival has a number of support groups, including a content group, sponsorship group, technical group, communication group and volunteer group. These groups feed into the main group's monthly meetings. The festival logo was inspired by contributions from pupils at Ysgol Syr Hugh Owen and designed by Iestyn Lloyd of Cwmni Da. The festival has been supported by Welsh Government through the Food Festival Grant Scheme and was highly commended by Food Awards Wales in 2019. Car parking is provided at the Slate Quay (Cei Llechi) and at other car parks around the town while the Welsh Highland Railway provides transport from Porthmadog. Cycle access is by the cycle tracks along the disused railway lines which include Lôn Las Eifion, which runs from Porthmadog, by-passing Penygroes and on to Caernarfon, Lôn Las Menai from Y Felinheli to Caernarfon and Lôn Las Peris from Llanberis to Caernarfon.

== Freedom of the Town ==
The following people and military units have received the Freedom of the Town of Caernarfon.

=== Military Units ===
- The Royal Welch Fusiliers: 1946.
- The Royal Welsh: 25 April 2009.

== See also ==
- George Herbert, 5th Earl of Carnarvon
