= Bangor and Carnarvon Railway =

Overview
- Locale: Wales
- Continues as: Chester and Holyhead Railway

History
- Opened: 20 May 1851

Technical
- Line length: 9 miles (14 km) (including Port Dinorwic Branch)
- Track gauge: 4 ft 8 1/2 in (1,435 mm)

The Bangor and Carnarvon Railway (B&CR) was a railway company promoted to build a branch railway connecting Caernarfon with the main line at Bangor, in north-west Wales. It opened in 1852 as far as Port Dinorwic (now Y Felinheli) and was extended to Caernarfon later in the same year.

At first Carnarvon station was a terminus, but a through line from Afon Wen and a branch line to Llanberis were built by other companies. At first those lines were not connected but in 1870 the Carnarvon Town Line was opened, penetrating the town by a short tunnel and connecting the other lines.

The ordinary use of the line declined after 1945, but the Investiture of Prince Charles at Carnarvon in 1969 involved special use of the branch. However it closed in January 1970. In May of the same year, there was a catastrophic fire in the Britannia Bridge and the rail-borne container traffic was unable to connect Holyhead for the Irish ferry services. Caernarfon goods station was quickly brought back into use, in June 1970. When the Britannia Bridge was reopened, the Caernarfon line was finally closed on 5 January 1972.

== Conception ==
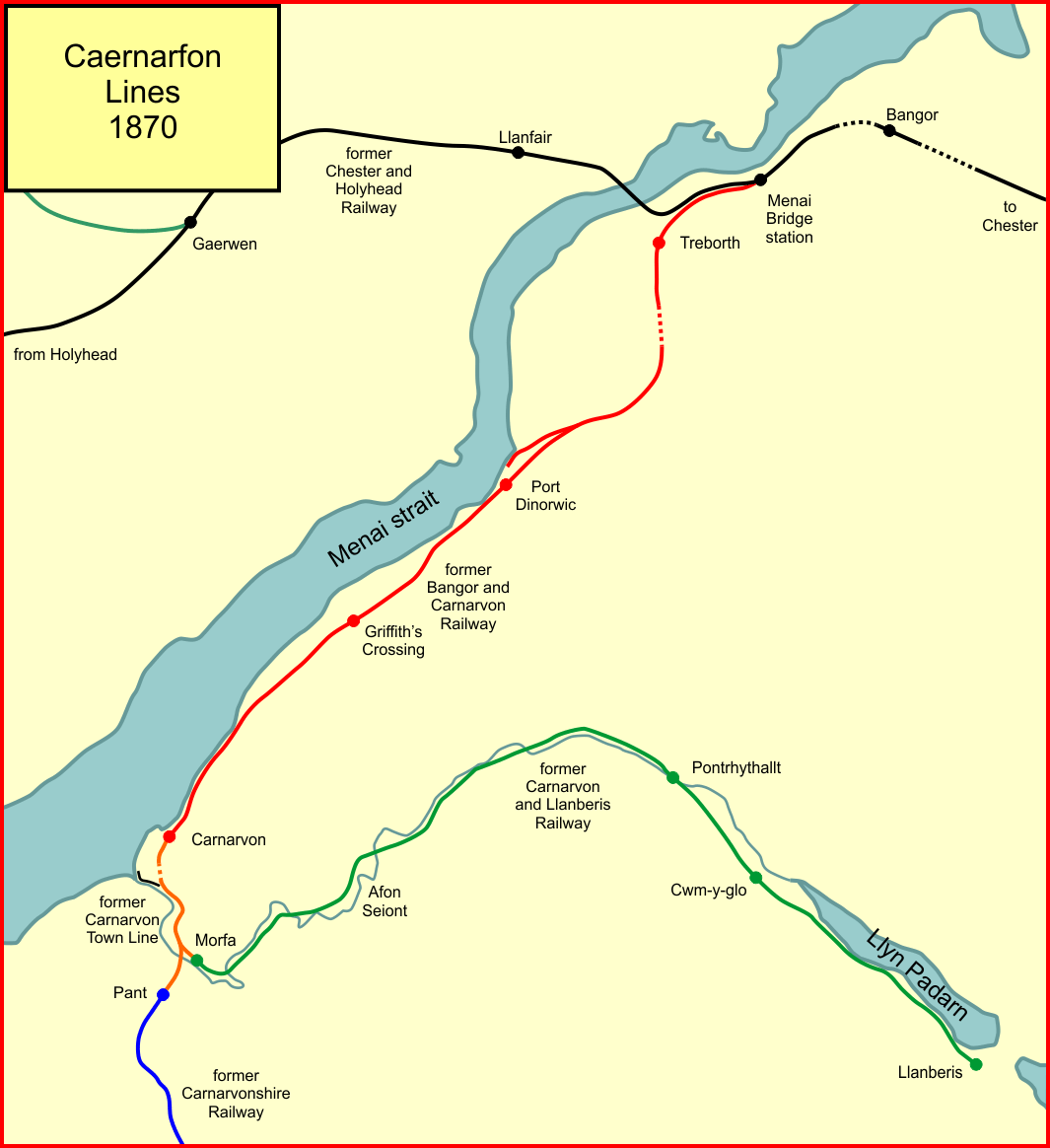
The Bangor and Carnarvon Railway

The Chester and Holyhead Railway (C&HR) opened its line from Chester to Bangor on 1 May 1848. This was followed on 1 August 1848 by opening on Anglesey, from Llanfair to Holyhead. The intervening section was delayed by the construction of the bridge over the Menai Strait, which came to be known as the Britannia Bridge; it opened in 1850.

Bangor and Caernarvon Railway Act 1851
- Act of Parliament
- Parliament of the United Kingdom
- Long title: An Act for making a Railway from the Chester and Holyhead Railway near Bangor to Port Dinorwic and Caernarvon.
- Citation: 14 & 15 Vict. c. xxi

Dates
- Royal assent: 20 May 1851

Text of statute as originally enacted

Caernarfon (then spelt Carnarvon) was an established regional centre, and a rail connection had long been considered. The Chester and Holyhead Railway had contemplated building a branch line, but in fact it was a private scheme which gained support, to Port Dinorwic only at first. The Bangor and Carnarvon Railway was authorised by the Bangor and Caernarvon Railway Act 1851 (14 & 15 Vict. c. xxi) on 20 May 1851. The Bangor and Caernarvon Railway Act 1851 permitted the Chester and Holyhead Railway to work the line. It was to make a junction with the C&HR main line at a junction a little east of Britannia Bridge.

Port Dinorwic had been provided with a dock in 1828, its principal traffic being the export of slate. The Dinorwic Railway connected to it, superseded from 1843 by the Padarn Railway. The Bangor and Carnarvon Railway reached Port Dinorwic on 1 March 1852, and the chief traffic of the new railway was slate. Passenger traffic started nine days later. It was a single line.

Bangor and Caernarvon Railway (Transfer) Act 1854
- Act of Parliament
- Parliament of the United Kingdom
- Long title: An Act to enable the Bangor and Caernarvon Railway Company to raise additional Capital, and to authorize the Sale or Lease of the said Company's Railway to the Chester and Holyhead Railway Company.
- Citation: 17 & 18 Vict. c. clxviii

Dates
- Royal assent: 10 July 1854

Text of statute as originally enacted

The extension to Carnarvon was undertaken immediately, and the line was opened throughout to Carnarvon on 1 July 1852; goods and mineral traffic started on 10 July 1852. The extension diverged from the Port Dinorwic line about a mile east of that place, necessitated by the ground levels: the continuation had to be above the level of the Port. The stub to the port became known as the Port Siding. The Bangor and Carnarvon Railway was leased to the Chester and Holyhead Railway by the Bangor and Caernarvon Railway (Transfer) Act 1854 (17 & 18 Vict. c. clxviii), and absorbed by the London and North Western Railway (LNWR) by the London and North Western Railway (New Works and Additional Powers) Act 1867 (30 & 31 Vict. c. cxliv) The LNWR had earlier, in 1859, absorbed the C&HR. (Note: Dates from Baughan and Grant; Gairns, writing in 1925, said leased "from the date of its opening and was taken over in 1858 [by the LNWR]" but this appears to be a mistake.)

The passenger train service was good, six trains running each way daily, with three on Sundays; population growth in the district was vigorous.

On 9 May 1865 there was an accident at the Menai Bridge Junction station; a train from Carnarvon was standing in the branch loop platform at a signal at danger. The exit from the platform was in the up direction; it would cross the down main C&HR line, and a down train was approaching on that line. The driver of the Carnarvon train was given the right-away by his guard, and he started away without checking the starting signal, which was still at danger. 25 persons were injured in the resulting collision.

In 1871 powers were obtained to double the line, and the Menai Bridge to Treborth section and the Port Dinorwic to Caernarfon sections were doubled in 1872; the central section was finished in 1874, including a duplicate bore for Vaynol Tunnel.

== Carnarvonshire Railway ==
In 1867 the Carnarvonshire Railway was opened from Pant southward to Afon Wen: Pant was south of the Seiont River.

== Carnarvon and Llanberis Railway ==
In 1864 the Carnarvon and Llanberis Railway (C&LR) was authorised. It was to run from the Carnarvonshire Railway near its Carnarvon terminus, to Llanberis. Slate was to be the primary traffic. In 1865 a connecting line was authorised, northwards from the Carnarvonshire Railway to join the Bangor and Carnarvon Railway on the north side of the town: it became known as the Carnarvon Town Line.

The C&LR was short of cash to build the Town Line: the London and North Western Railway (LNWR) seized the opportunity, and acquired joint ownership of the Llanberis end of the (unbuilt) line and running powers over the rest of the line, in exchange for permission to use the B&CR station at Carnarvon. Relations between the LNWR and the C&LR board were difficult, and the matter was resolved when in 1868 the LNWR acquired joint ownership of the whole line, and agreement to work the line.

The LNWR expedited the construction, and the C&LR line opened on 1 July 1879, but only as far as a Morfa station, short of the planned point of convergence with the Carnarvonshire Railway line.

== Carnarvon Town Line ==
The Carnarvon Town Line was opened by the LNWR on 5 July 1870 for goods traffic only. It included connections to the Carnarvonshire Railway and the Llanberis line on the south side of the town. The construction within the town was cramped, and the station had a single platform. The line opened for passenger trains in January 1871.

== 1895 train service ==
Bradshaw's Guide for 1895 shows the passenger service: there were eight trains each way daily, and two on Sundays. Not all of the trains called at all the stations.

== Caernarvon station ==
In 1894 the station at Caernarvon was enlarged with enhanced goods and passenger facilities.

In 1911, there was an investiture of the Prince of Wales (later King Edward VIII) at Caernarvon. Special platforms were constructed for those attending; the Royal Train used Griffiths Crossing.

== After 1939 ==
During World War II a naval college was established close to Penychain station, near Pwllheli on the Barmouth line. After the war the site was developed as a Butlin's Holiday Camp, opened to the public in the Spring of 1947. Considerable numbers of holiday makers stayed at the camp, and nearly all travelled by train at that time; numerous summer holiday trains were run. While much of the extra service was from the south via Shrewsbury, there was an enhanced service between Penychain and Pwllheli, and Bangor, in some cases continuing through to Manchester and Liverpool.

In 1957 diesel multiple units were introduced onto some of the services on the line but steam still dominated. On 7 December 1964 the passenger service between Caernarfon and Afon Wen closed, and the Llanberis line closed completely on 7 September 1964. Caernarvon station was therefore a terminus, served only from Menai Bridge Junction; the line was singled in 1966.

From the summer of 1965 there were still some longer-distance workings. The Butlin's Holiday Camp traffic was still catered for, but now this involved a transfer at Caernarfon to road coaches; this proved an unpopular arrangement at a time when road transport throughout was increasingly available, and use of the train service declined steeply.

On 1 July 1969 Prince Charles was invested as Prince of Wales at Caernarfon and several special trains were run. Empty stock was stored on the remaining stub section of the Afon Wen line.

Ordinary traffic on the branch continued to decline, and the goods service was withdrawn on 4 August 1969; the passenger service was withdrawn on 5 January 1970, and the branch closed completely.

== Britannia Bridge fire ==
On 23 May 1970 there was a catastrophic fire on the Britannia Bridge, which resulted in its immediate temporary closure. This isolated Holyhead from the railway network; Holyhead was, at that time, an important freightliner depot for Irish traffic, and was therefore inaccessible.

Emergency arrangements were made to reopen Caernarfon goods yard as a temporary container terminal for freightliner services; this arrangement started on 15 June 1970. On restoration of the Britannia Bridge, the use of Caernarfon ceased and on 5 February 1972 the line was again closed completely.

== Location list ==
- Menai Bridge; main line station; opened 1 October 1858; closed 14 February 1966;
- Treborth; opened June 1858; closed 2 March 1959;
- Port Dinorwic; opened 1 July 1852; relocated on opening of extension line 1873; closed 12 September 1960;
- Griffith's Crossing; opened June 1854; closed 5 July 1937;
- Carnarvon; opened 1 July 1852; renamed Caernarvon 1926; closed 5 January 1970.
