= List of stations and halts on the Welsh Highland Railway =

This is a list of the stations and halts on the Welsh Highland Railway

== Original ==
- Dinas
- Tryfan Junction
  - Rhostryfan
  - Bryngwyn
- Waunfawr
- Bettws Garmon
- Salem Halt
- Plas-y-Nant
- Snowdon Ranger
- Rhyd Ddu
- Hafod Ruffydd Halt
- Beddgelert
- Nantmor
- Hafod y Llyn
- Hafod Garregog Halt
- Croesor Junction
- Ynysfor Halt
- Pont Croesor Halt
- Portmadoc New (1933) station
- Portmadoc New (1923) station
- Porthmadog Harbour

== Restored Welsh Highland Railway / Rheilffordd Eyri ==
- Caernarfon
- Bontnewydd
- Dinas
- Tryfan Junction
- Waunfawr
- Plas-y-Nant
- Snowdon Ranger
- Rhyd Ddu
- Meillionen
- Beddgelert
- Nantmor
- Pont Croesor
- Porthmadog Harbour

== Welsh Highland Heritage Railway ==
- Pen-y-Mount
- Gelert's Farm halt
- Porthmadog (WHR)
