= Porthmadog cross town link =

Section of railway in north Wales

Coordinates: 52.9242°N 4.1263°W

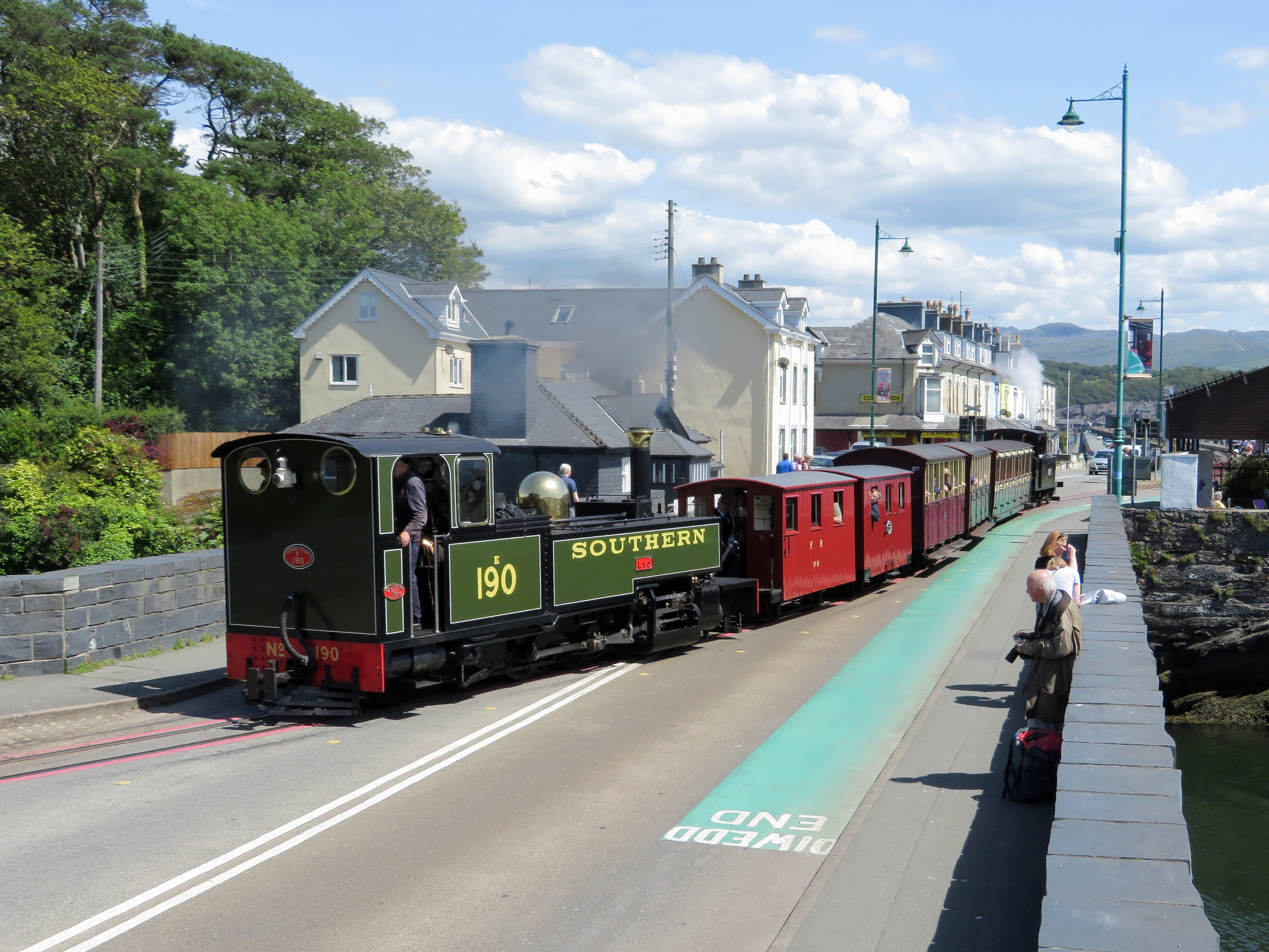
Steam train on the tramlines crossing Britannia Bridge towards Harbour station

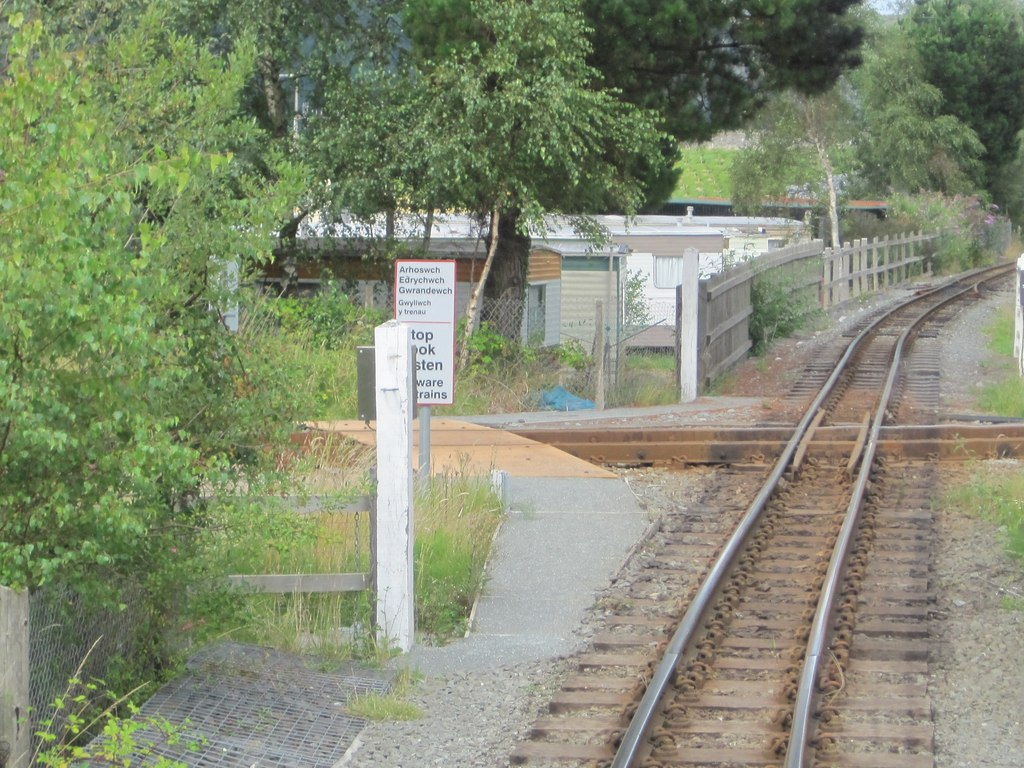
At-grade Cambrian Line crossing

The Porthmadog cross town link is a section of the 1 ft 11 1/2 in (597 mm) narrow gauge Welsh Highland Railway, specifically built to link with the Ffestiniog Railway in Porthmadog, and runs along partly what was called the Junction Railway, previously existing as part of the original Welsh Highland Railway. This had been removed some time after that railway closed in 1936.

It has been built using the new powers obtained by the Ffestiniog Railway and runs from Harbour station on the Ffestiniog Railway to Pen-y-Mount Junction close to Pen-y-Mount on the Welsh Highland Heritage Railway.

The route is as follows:

- Junction with the Ffestiniog Railway at Harbour station.
- Cross Porthmadog High St and the River Glaslyn across the Britannia Bridge with road traffic stopped by lights when trains pass.
- Around the back of the former Wilko now B&M supermarket. As such this is a deviation from the original line, that broadly speaking went in front of what is now the supermarket.
- Across the back streets, in front of the old mill.
- Across the standard gauge Cambrian Line on the level. This is the only mixed gauge flat rail crossing in the United Kingdom.
- Along the track bed of the Welsh Highland Railway.
- Junction just north Pen-y-Mount with Welsh Highland Heritage Railway to Porthmadog (WHHR).

For reference, the Junction Railway was empowered to run:

- Junction with the Ffestiniog Railway at Harbour Station.
- Cross Porthmadog High St and the River Glaslyn across the Britannia Bridge with street running.
- a short small curve onto Madoc Street to join to the existing Croesor Tramway line which was taken over by the Welsh Highland Railway.

The line reopened on 8 January 2011, linking the Ffestiniog Railway with the Croesor Tramway allowing passenger trains to run between Caernarfon and Blaenau Ffestiniog.

Preceding station	Heritage railways	Following station
Pont Croesor towards Caernarfon	Welsh Highland Railway Porthmadog cross town link	Porthmadog Harbour Terminus
