= Beddgelert railway station =

Heritage railway station in Gwynedd, Wales

Beddgelert
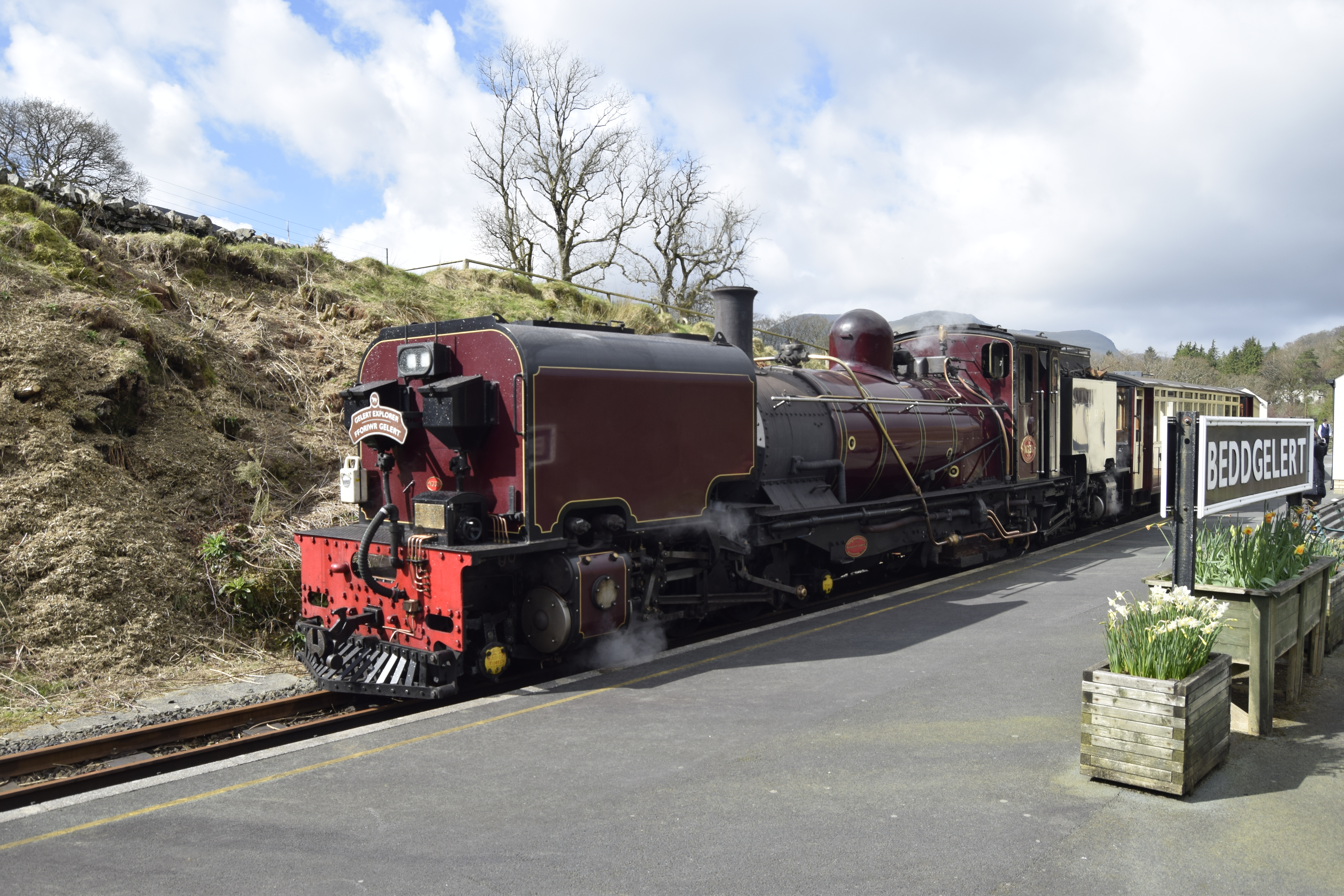
- NG130 at the station (2024)

General information
- Location: Beddgelert, Gwynedd, Wales
- Coordinates: 53.01211°N 4.10851°W
- Grid reference: SH586481
- System: Station on heritage railway
- Owner: Festiniog Railway Company
- Manager: Ffestiniog Railway
- Platforms: 2

History
- Original company: Welsh Highland Railway

Key dates
- 1922: Opened
- 1936: Closed
- April 2007: Track laid through site
- 7 April 2009: Ceremonial reopening
- 8 April 2009: Station reopens
Location

Beddgelert railway station serves the village of Beddgelert, in Gwynedd, Wales. It lies on the narrow-gauge preserved Welsh Highland Railway. The rebuilt station was opened ceremonially by Lord Elis-Thomas on 7 April 2009.

== History ==
The original station on the Welsh Highland Railway line, between Dinas and Portmadoc, operated between 1922 and 1936, with a passing loop and three sidings.

== Construction ==
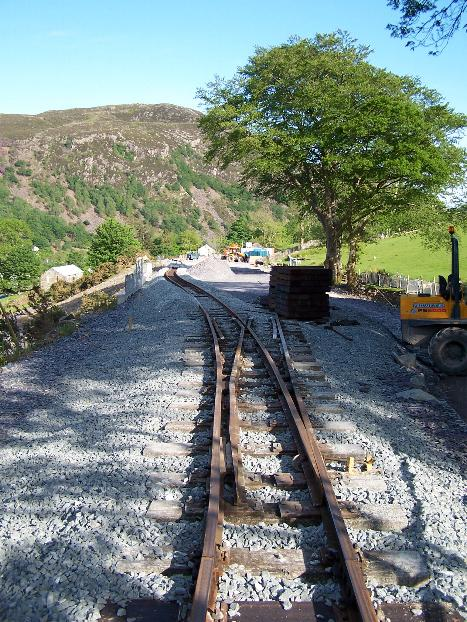
A southerly view of the station during its reconstruction (2007)

Work to rebuild the station began in December 2006. The new station has a large curved island platform, allowing for two trains to pass each other. There are two small shelters for passenger use.

A large water tower was installed at the north-west end of the platform. An original locomotive siding on the west side of the station has been retained and lengthened. The original water tower from Old WHR days, on the down side of the station, has been restored and is used occasionally for small locomotives. The main station building is located to the north-east of the platform. Construction commenced in 2007, with the laying of the base; however, due to financial reasons, it was never completed and so a temporary booking office was used in front of the foundations.

== Opposition ==
Plans to reopen the station in Beddgelert created local opposition over a number of matters in 2005; they believed it would be too big, too close to their properties, intrude on the landscape, increase traffic in the village and make parking difficult. There had been an expectation amongst some locals that the station would be rebuilt on the previous site, despite the new position and size of the building having already been approved in 1999.

It had been agreed with the Snowdonia National Park Authority (SNPA) that the station would not open until the railway was completed to the south side of the National Park. Restrictions were placed upon the company by the National Park Authority but, on 23 July 2008, the SNPA was compelled, on appeal, to revoke a planning condition which would have limited sales at the station to tickets and railway souvenirs only.

== Buildings ==
From its reopening in 2009, there have been two solid shelters on the station, given by benefactors, with portaloos and an office for the station manager.

In 2023, the Snowdonia National Park's planning authority approved plans to develop a new station on the line. The plans come as a redesign of a previous application that was approved in 1999, but was never completed.

== Operations ==
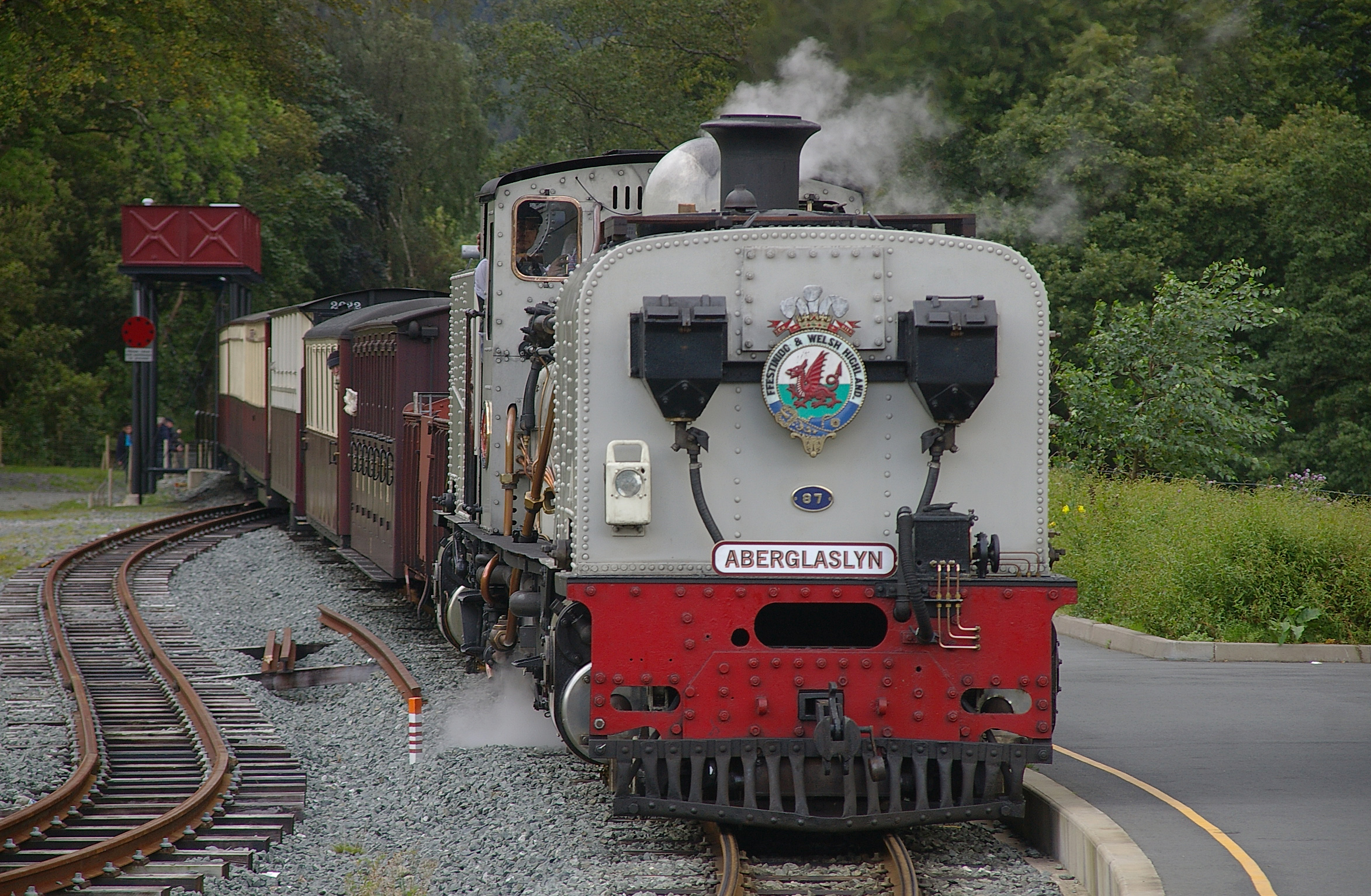
Number 87 arrives at Beddgelert on its way to Hafod-y-llyn

Initially, in its first six weeks of operation, all trains terminated at Beddgelert. Since then, the line has been extended; firstly to a temporary halt at Hafod y Llyn, then on to Pont Croesor in May 2010. During the 2011 peak season, most trains terminated at Pont Croesor, connecting with trains to Porthmadog Harbour.

Services now operate between Caernarfon and Portmadog Harbour.

Preceding station	Heritage railways	Following station
Meillionen towards Caernarfon	Welsh Highland Railway	Nantmor towards Porthmadog Harbour
Historical railways
Hafod Ruffydd Halt	Welsh Highland Railway	Nantmor
