= Nantmor railway station =

Disused railway station in Nantmor, Gwynedd

Nantmor
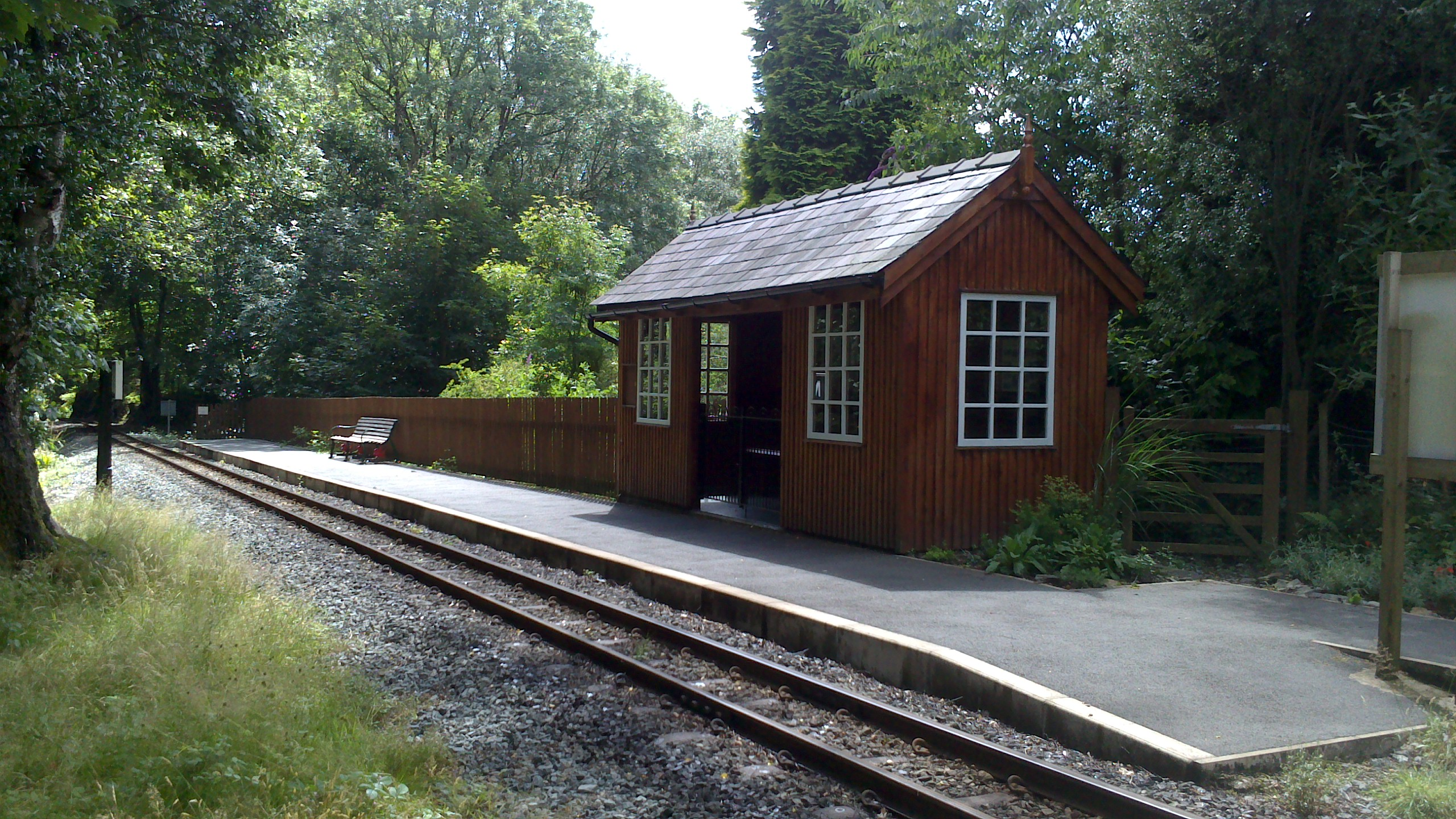

General information
- Location: Nantmor, Gwynedd; Wales
- Coordinates: 52.99357°N 4.08919°W
- Grid reference: SH598461
- System: Station on heritage railway
- Owner: Festiniog Railway Company
- Manager: Welsh Highland Railway
- Platforms: 1

History
- Original company: Welsh Highland Railway

Key dates
- 1923: opened
- 1934: renamed Aberglaslyn
- 1936: closed
- 2007: planning permission approved
- 26 May 2010: Reopened
Location

Nantmor is a railway halt in North Wales serving the nearby hamlet of the same name. It is located between the stations of Beddgelert and Pont Croesor on the recently restored Welsh Highland Railway. It had existed during the first period of the WHR, 1923–1936, and was rebuilt for the current line, opening on 27 May 2010.

== History ==
It was originally constructed as part of the Welsh Highland Railway and opened in 1923. In 1934 the Festiniog Railway Company assumed direct control of the WHR and renamed the station Aberglaslyn as part of an attempt to attract more passengers. The station closed in 1936 when passenger traffic on the historic railway ceased.

The original station had a corrugated iron building. A replica was built in 1996, by the WHR Ltd, at its terminus at Pen-y-Mount Junction.

== Present day ==
Although there were plans for a halt serving Nantmor when the re-building of the WHR was proposed, they were dropped because of local objections. Subsequently, on 23 and 24 February 2007, a parish vote was held and by a large majority, (36 to 11) they agreed to ask for a halt to be located in the village. The plans were revived, and submitted to the Snowdonia National Park Authority on 18 July 2007.

Approval was granted on 6 December 2007. Construction was delayed until February 2010 due to a shortage of resources and work was completed by 16 March 2010. It re-opened on 26 May 2010, when the line was extended to Pont Croesor. The rebuilding had been funded by the Welsh Highland Railway Society using funds donated in memory of one of its members.

Preceding station	Heritage railways	Following station
Beddgelert towards Caernarfon	Welsh Highland Railway	Pont Croesor towards Porthmadog Harbour
Historical railways
Beddgelert	Welsh Highland Railway	Hafod y Llyn
