= Traeth Mawr Loop =

General information
- Location: Porthmadog, Gwynedd; Wales
- Coordinates: 52.93998°N 4.11254°W
- Grid reference: SH581401
- System: Station on heritage railway
- Manager: WHR Ltd
- Platforms: 0

History
- Original company: Croesor Tramway

Key dates
- 23 March 2007: Opened
- 28 October 2007: Closed
Location

Traeth Mawr Loop was a short-lived terminus during the restoration of the Welsh Highland Railway (WHR). The run-around loop was located within Traeth Mawr just the north of Porthmadog, Wales. It operated during 2007 before being replaced by the new mainline a year later.

Track laying to Traeth Mawr was completed by the Welsh Highland Railway by November 2006, making it the northern limit of the WHR from Porthmadog. The terminus, which had a run-around loop, opened to passengers services on 23 March 2007. Passengers were unable to board or alight at Traeth Mawr. The last public service was on 28 October 2007. Although WHR ran push-pull services to a point just south of Farmyard Farm Crossing, for some time afterwards.

After closure, the Traeth Mawr loop was removed in order to construct the WHR's new main line building southwards. On 31 August 2008, the final length of track from Caernarfon was laid at the location of the former loop. The line from Pen-y-mount to Traeth Mawr was removed from operational service at the end of the 2008 season.

In 2009 construction of the Welsh Highland Railway from Caernarfon was continued through this stretch with Subscribers' trains from Caernarfon passing through the site of the loop in autumn 2009, and again through to Porthmadog Harbour on 31 October 2010. Regular passenger trains on the completed line through the former site of the Traeth Mawr Loop re-commenced from Porthmadog Harbour on 4 January 2011.

Preceding station	Heritage railways	Following station
Pont Croesor	Welsh Highland Railway	Pen-y-Mount station
