= Hafod y Llyn railway station =

Railway infrastructure in North Wales

Hafod y Llyn
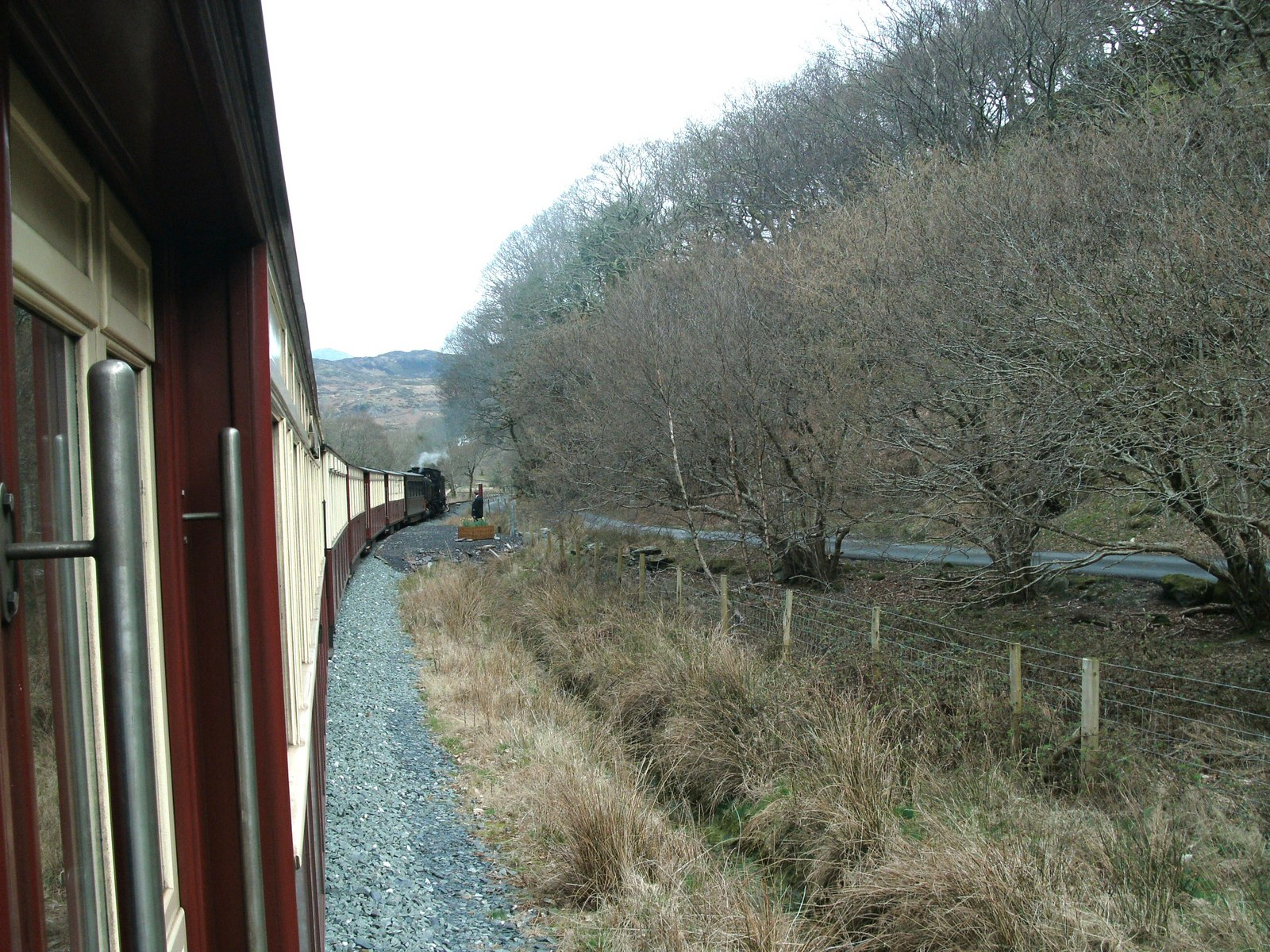
- The site of the station viewed from a passing train

General information
- Location: Porthmadog, Gwynedd; Wales
- Coordinates: 52.98259°N 4.09141°W
- Grid reference: SH596448
- System: Station on heritage railway
- Owner: Festiniog Railway Company
- Manager: Welsh Highland Railway
- Platforms: Temporary construction

History
- Original company: Welsh Highland Railway

Key dates
- 2009: New temporary platform opened
- 26 May 2010: Closed
- January 2011: Re-opened
- March 2011: Closed for regular services
Location

Hafod y Llyn is a halt in North Wales on the Welsh Highland Railway, located between Beddgelert and Pont Croesor. It had been a halt, with a siding for a period on the original WHR, and a temporary terminus during the rebuilding of the line.

Originally, there was no plan for any construction here on the rebuilding, with a new halt of the same name being planned 850 m south of this location. However, being a convenient place for a loop during the rebuild, the construction of a small platform (with no other facilities) was undertaken in 2009. For a short space of time, it was to be called Hen Hafod, but local representation convinced the idea to be dropped

The station opened to passenger traffic on 21 May 2009 and was the WHR's southern terminus. As the station had no parking or other passenger facilities, only self-sufficient walkers and cyclists could board or alight there.

Hafod y Llyn closed on 26 May 2010, when the next section of line to Pont Croesor opened. From January to March, 2011, trains ran to Hafod y Llyn from Porthmadog as part of the Winter Warmer services. This replaced the similar service on the Ffestiniog line to Trwyn-y-garnedd, which was suspended due to the bypass construction work at Minffordd. It is still occasionally used such as in March 2017 when it appeared in the timetable.

Preceding station	Heritage railways	Following station
Inactive service
Nantmor towards Caernarfon	Welsh Highland Railway	Pont Croesor towards Porthmadog Harbour
Historical railways
Nantmor	Welsh Highland Railway	Hafod Garregog
