= Dinas, Gwynedd =

Coordinates: 53.102°N 4.275°W

Dinas
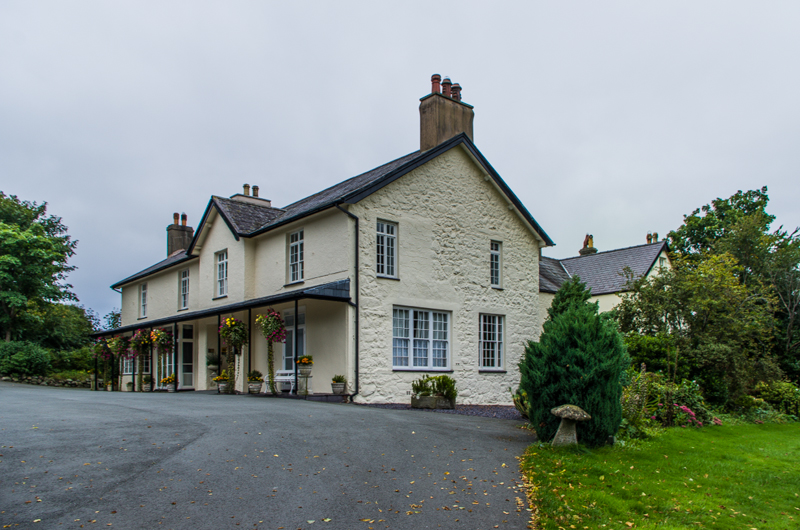
- Plas Dinas

- Location within Gwynedd
- OS grid reference: SH477585
- Community: Llanwnda
- Principal area: Gwynedd
- Country: Wales
- Sovereign state: United Kingdom
- Post town: CAERNARFON
- Postcode district: LL54
- Dialling code: 01286
- Police: North Wales
- Fire: North Wales
- Ambulance: Welsh
- UK Parliament: Dwyfor Meirionnydd
- Senedd Cymru – Welsh Parliament: Arfon

Dinas is a large hamlet near Bontnewydd, Caernarfon, in Gwynedd, north-west Wales.

It is in the ancient parish and modern community of Llanwnda and is served by the parish church of St. Gwyndaf in Llanwnda village, which is about a quarter of a mile to the south.

The hamlet developed with the opening of the turnpike Toll roads from Caernarfon first to Pwllheli in 1805, then to Porthmadog in 1810. Two coaching inns were built to serve the roads, Y Mount, which is now an Indian restaurant and Tafarn Hen, which is now a private residence.

The Carnarvonshire Railway was built in 1866 on the route of the horse drawn Nantlle Railway. The building in 1878 of the North Wales Narrow Gauge Railways (later part of the Welsh Highland Railway) resulted in the opening of Dinas Junction station complete with slate transshipment facilities, which brought the construction of houses for the railway staff. The 20th century saw the development of suburban housing for Caernarfon.

The present Dinas railway station, on the site of the Dinas Junction, was reopened in 1997 as a base for rebuilding the Welsh Highland Railway from Caernarfon to Porthmadog. It is a visitor attraction and local passenger facility that also links Dinas to Waunfawr, Beddgelert, Pont Croesor and beyond.
