= Pen-y-Mount Junction railway station =

Heritage railway station in Gwynedd, Wales

Pen-y-Mount
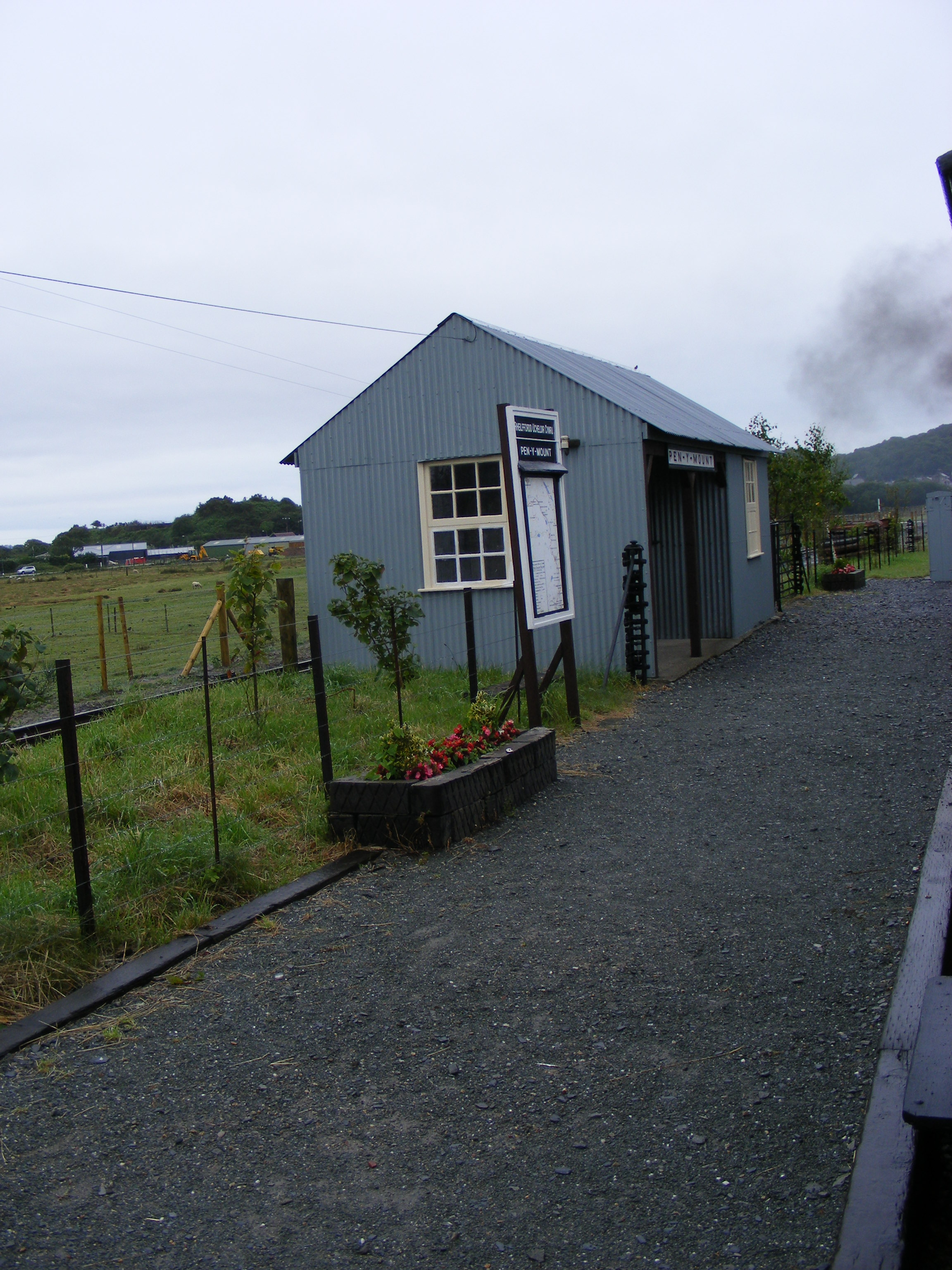
- Pen-y-Mount Junction station

General information
- Location: Porthmadog, Gwynedd, Wales
- Coordinates: 52.93415°N 4.12392°W
- Grid reference: SH573395
- System: Station on heritage railway
- Owner: WHR Ltd
- Manager: Welsh Highland Heritage Railway
- Platforms: 3

Key dates
- 1980: Opened
- 2007: Line north opened to Traeth Mawr, second platform opened
- 2019: Platform 3 opened for special events
Location

Pen-y-Mount Junction is the northern terminus of the Welsh Highland Heritage Railway in north-east Porthmadog, Gwynedd, Wales. It is situated immediately south of the junction connecting the line to the main Welsh Highland Railway line, although it only regularly serves the former.

== History ==
The station opened on 2 August 1980, at which time it consisted of a single platform with a run round loop; it was intended to be a temporary terminus.

In 1990, a siding was laid into the yard for works trains. After the Festiniog Railway Company (FRC) gained the authority to rebuild the original, it was decided to turn Pen-y-Mount into a representation of a typical WHR station.

In 1996, a replica Welsh Highland Railway (WHR) corrugated iron station building was constructed. Its design was based upon the original Nantmor station. Subsequently, genuine WHR fencing, including a kissing gate, was erected along the back of the platform.

In 2000, the WHHR began construction of the WHR main line, under the terms of their 1998 agreement with the FRC; this included clearing, preparing the track bed, tracklaying and ballasting. The northern end of the Welsh Highland Heritage Railway (WHHR) line was also remodelled; in 2002, the existing headshunt was replaced with a full crossover so it could connect with the FRC-owned WHR main line. A new headshunt loading spur was also constructed. It also helped construct the main line between Pen-y-Mount and the Porthmadog Cross Town Link.

The WHHR finished construction work in 2007. Under the terms of the 1998 agreement, they were allowed to use the new line and retain all revenue from it until the FR had finished constructing the remainder of the WHR. During 2007 and 2008, WHHR trains terminated at Traeth Mawr Loop rather than Pen-y-Mount. In 2008, the Traeth Mawr loop was removed and WHHR trains used push-pull operation.

In 2008, the Welsh Highland Construction Company (Note: A subsidiary of the Festiniog Railway Company.) connected the two ends of the Welsh Highland Railway and took possession of the line from Traeth Mawr to Pen-y-Mount. Since 2009, WHHR trains have terminated at Pen-y-Mount.

== Layout ==
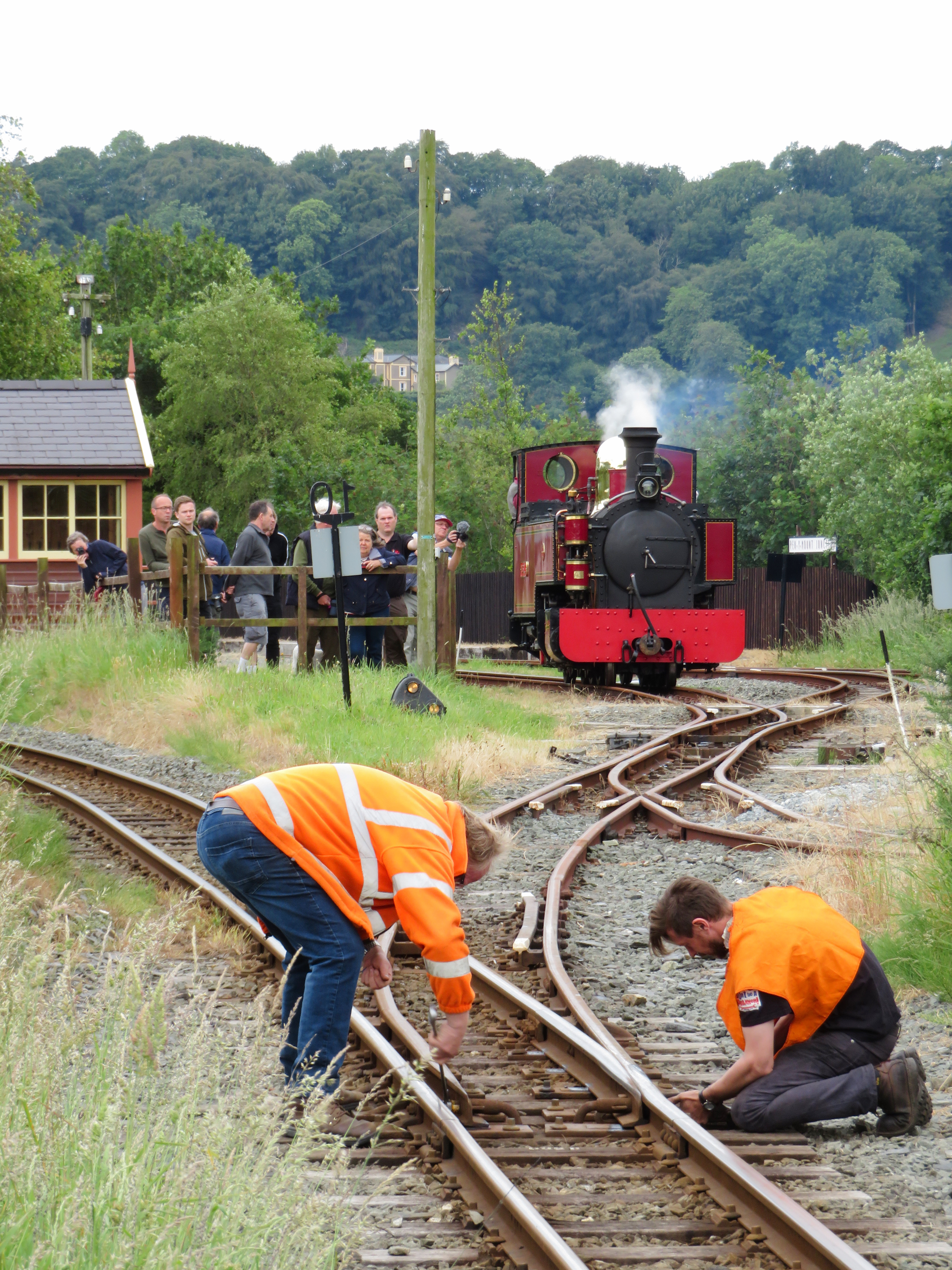
Russell departs Pen-y-Mount on to the WHR main line. As there are no facing point locks on the WHR points, they must be clamped manually

The station has three platforms, only one of which is in regular use:

1. serves the run-round loop for additional WHHR services, as required
2. main terminal platform for the WHHR
3. faces the WHR line, used for special events.

A signal box, intended originally for Cae Pawb flat crossing, is located on the north end of platforms 1 and 2.

Pen-Y-Mount is also the nominal break in gauge between WHHR (600mm) and WHR (597mm).

== Services ==
Throughout the summer, the station typically sees four or five trains per day from Porthmadog,

The junction north of the station is protected by a stop block and facing point locks, to prevent unauthorised trains from running across the crossing. In all, six padlocks (three for each company) are required to be unlocked to use the crossing.

The station is not currently a token stop; a token to enter the WHR must be obtained first from Porthmadog Harbour or Pont Croesor before the stop block can be removed. Special permission is required from the WHHR to enter its line.

Preceding station	Heritage railways	Following station
Gelert's Farm Halt towards Porthmadog (WHHR)	Welsh Highland Heritage Railway	Terminus
Porthmadog Harbour Terminus	Welsh Highland Railway Special events only	Pont Croesor towards Caernarfon
