= Welsh Highland Railway =

Heritage railway in the Welsh county of Gwynedd

Coordinates: 53°03′05.00″N 4°08′01.00″W

Welsh Highland Railway Rheilffordd Eryri (Welsh)
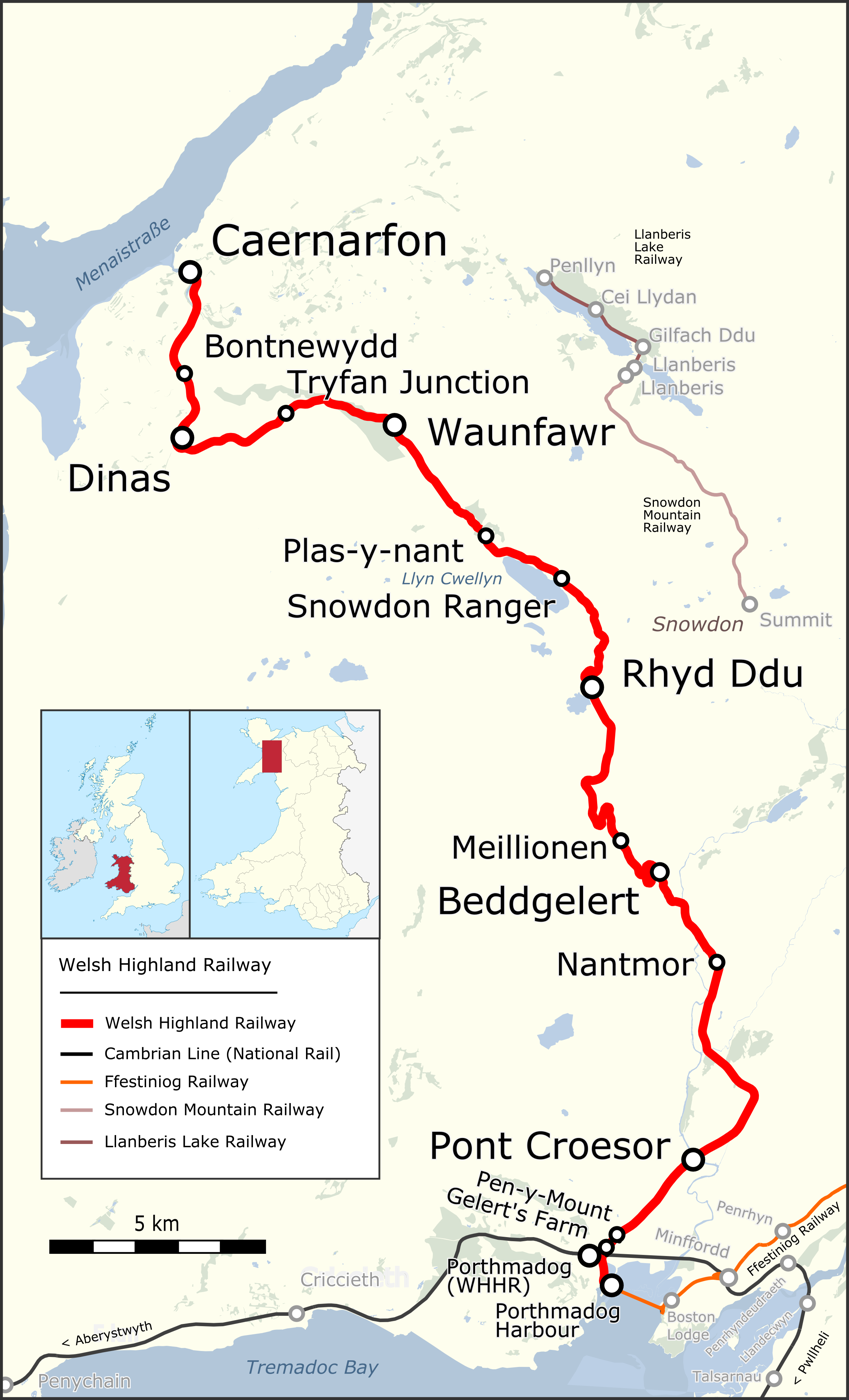
- Locale: Wales
- Terminus: Caernarfon and Porthmadog

Commercial operations
- Name: Welsh Highland Railway Company
- Built by: North Wales Narrow Gauge Railways, Welsh Highland Railway
- Original gauge: 1 ft 11 1/2 in (597 mm)

Preserved operations
- Operated by: Festiniog Railway Company and Welsh Highland Railway Limited
- Stations: 13 on WHR/RhE and 3 on WHHR
- Length: 25 miles (40.2 km) and 0.75 mi (1.2 km)
- Preserved gauge: 600 mm (1 ft 11 5/8 in)(Nominal)

Commercial history
- Opened: 1922
- Closed: 1937

Preservation history
- 1961: Welsh Highland Railway Society formed
- 1964: WHR Society reformed as Welsh Highland Light Railway (1964) Limited
- 1980: WHR Limited line opened for passenger service
- 1990: FR Co. became involved
- 11 October 1997: WHR (Caernarfon) opened from Caernarfon to Dinas
- 7 August 2000: Reopened – Dinas to Waunfawr
- 18 August 2003: Reopened – Waunfawr to Rhyd Ddu
- 7 April 2009: Reopened – Rhyd Ddu to Beddgelert
- 21 May 2009: Reopened – Beddgelert to Hafod y Llyn
- 27 May 2010: Reopened – Hafod y Llyn to Pont Croesor
- 4 January 2011: Reopened – Pont Croesor to Porthmadog Harbour
- 19 February 2011: First through public passenger trains between Porthmadog and Caernarfon

The Welsh Highland Railway (WHR; Welsh: Rheilffordd Eryri, lit. 'Snowdonia Railway') is a restored 1 ft 11 1/2 in (597 mm) narrow-gauge heritage railway in the Welsh county of Gwynedd. It runs along a 25-mile (40.2 km) route from Caernarfon to Porthmadog, and passes through a number of popular tourist destinations including Beddgelert and the Aberglaslyn Pass. At Porthmadog it connects with the Ffestiniog Railway (Note: The spelling of many Welsh placenames has changed over the past 50 years, as use of the Welsh language and modernised spelling has gained ground. For example, "Ffestiniog" has replaced "Festiniog".) and to the Welsh Highland Heritage Railway. In Porthmadog it uses the United Kingdom's only mixed gauge flat rail crossing.

The restoration, which had the civil engineering mainly built by contractors and the track mainly built by volunteers, received a number of awards. Originally running from Dinas, near Caernarfon, to Porthmadog Harbour, the current line includes an additional section from Dinas to Caernarfon. The original line also had a branch to Bryngwyn and the slate quarries around Moel Tryfan, which has not been restored. (This branch forms a footpath "rail trail", the lower section of which has been resurfaced and supplied with heritage notice-boards.)

There is also the 3/4-mile (1.2 km) long Welsh Highland Heritage Railway, which runs from Porthmadog along the track bed of the former Cambrian Railways exchange siding and connects to the WHR main line at Pen-y-Mount junction.

== History ==
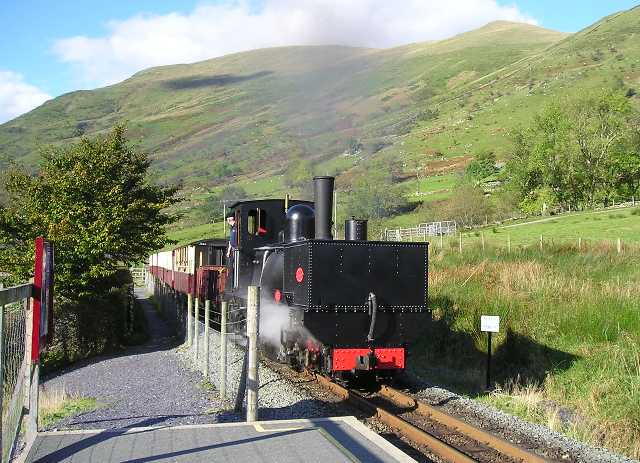
WHR locomotive K1, the first Garratt articulated locomotive, at Snowdon Ranger halt with train and Snowdonia behind

The original Welsh Highland Railway was formed in 1922 from the merger of two companies: the North Wales Narrow Gauge Railways (NWNGR) and the Portmadoc, Beddgelert and South Snowdon Railway (PBSSR), successor to the Portmadoc, Croesor and Beddgelert Tram Railway. It was never a commercial success; the carriages of the 1890s were outdated and uncomfortable for so long a ride, the journey took too long and the service had a reputation for being unreliable.

=== Forerunners: 1863–1921 ===
The Croesor Tramway had run from Porthmadog since 1863 up into the Croesor Valley and the slate quarries in this area. This was a horse-worked line laid to a nominal 2 ft (610 mm) gauge.

The NWNGR had originally built a 1 ft 11 1/2 in (597 mm) narrow-gauge line from a junction with the 4 ft 8 1/2 in (1,435 mm) standard gauge London and North Western Railway line at Dinas to Bryngwyn, with a branch from Tryfan Junction via Waunfawr to Llyn Cwellyn (Snowdon Ranger). The line was opened in 1877 and was extended to South Snowdon (Rhyd Ddu) in 1881, a total of 9 miles (14 km). This closed to passengers in 1914 but goods traffic continued up to its absorption by the WHR in 1922.

In 1902, the newly formed PBSSR took over the failed Portmadoc, Croesor and Beddgelert Tram Railway with the aim of extending it to South Snowdon slate quarry in the Nant Gwynant Pass. Work was abandoned by the outbreak of the First World War in 1914, although the tunnels through the Aberglaslyn Pass were mostly completed.

=== Formation and construction: 1921–1923 ===
The name Welsh Highland Railway first appeared in 1921 when a 1914 light railway order (LRO) was processed. It was originally drawn up by the local Caernarfonshire authorities and aimed to link the PBSSR and NWNGR but had been delayed by the First World War. It was revived by two local politicians and a Scottish distillery owner, Sir John Henderson Stewart. In July 1921, Stewart also obtained control of the Festiniog Railway, to obtain extra rolling stock for the WHR.

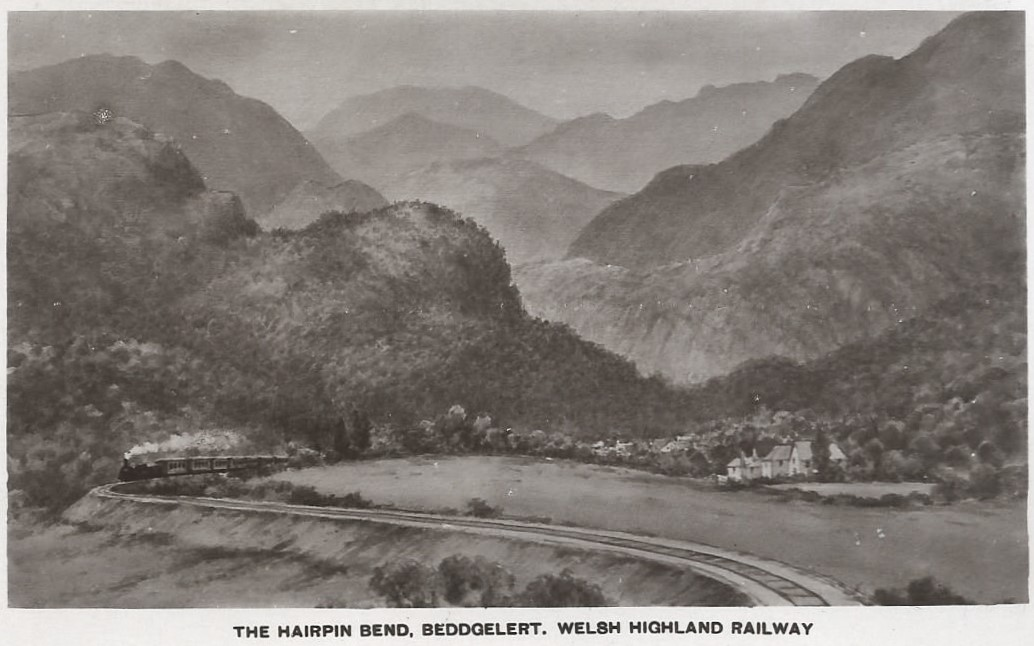
Welsh Highland Railway at Beddgelert, c. 1930 (Snowdon Mountain and Tramroad Hotels)

The LRO was passed as the Welsh Highland Railway (Light Railway) Order 1922 (SR&O 1922/432), following a public inquiry. The budget was £75,000 and much of the funding was borrowed from the Ministry of Transport and local authorities. According to the historian Peter Johnson, this would become a burden as the railway needed to generate the unlikely sum of £3,750 profit each year to service the debt.

Two further LROs, including the Welsh Highland Railway (Light Railway) Order 1923 (SR&O 1923/275), enabled improvements to the railway's alignment at Beddgelert, a new station site in Porthmadog and a link to the Festiniog Railway. McAlpine & Sons were contracted to refurbish the existing lines and complete the link between Rhyd Ddu and Croesor Junction, thus creating a railway that ran from Dinas to join the Festiniog Railway at Porthmadog. Like the modern day WHR, the railway was opened in stages. The former NWNGR section re-opened on 31 July 1922 and the remainder on 1 June 1923.

=== Fall into receivership: 1923–1933 ===
The WHR venture was not a success and was beset with problems from the start. Indeed, 1923 was its most successful year. Much hoped-for revenue from quarry traffic never materialised as the slate industry had fallen into decline. Its passenger services were also unsuccessful and could not compete with the local bus services, which often took half the time to complete the same journey. Its rolling stock was out of date, it lacked locomotives and carriages and its marketing was inadequate. In 1924, winter passenger services were discontinued due to poor traffic. A dispute with the Great Western Railway over the costs of the crossing over its line at Porthmadog also caused problems, despite the crossing having been used since 1867 without any charges or problems. The railway even had to resort to escorting passengers across the crossing on foot.

After 1923, it was unable to pay debenture interest and, in 1927, the county council sued and put the railway into receivership. Services continued and by 1933, it was run down and the local authorities decided to close it.

=== Control by the Festiniog Railway Company: 1934–1937 ===
In 1934, the company agreed to lease the line to the Festiniog Railway Company for 42 years. It was a disaster, with the FR forced to pay rent even if the WHR made a loss.

The FR Co. attempted to change the line's fortunes by re-focussing on the tourist market. This included painting the carriages bright colours, including yellow and blue, and promoting the Aberglaslyn Pass as a destination by renaming Nantmor station as Aberglaslyn. They also tried to promote round trip (return) journeys, with passengers taking the standard gauge line to Dinas, travelling on the WHR and the Festiniog Railway to Blaenau Ffestiniog and then changing again to take the standard gauge railway to their original starting point.

Despite these attempts, the FR Co. was unsuccessful: the last passenger train ran in 1936 and the last goods service in 1937. The early tourist industry did not provide sufficient visitors to make the railway pay, especially during the Depression. Competition from buses, which ran a faster and more regular service from Caernarfon and Beddgelert, also played a part. The last passenger train ran on 5 September 1936 and, in February 1937, the FR decided not to run the WHR again.

=== Fall into liquidation 1937–1941 ===
As there was no provision for the Ffestiniog Railway Company to hand back its lease and the WHR was bankrupt, the line became dormant. In 1941, the authorities decided to requisition the movable assets for use in the Second World War. Much of the rolling stock was sold off and most of the track was lifted. The Croesor Tramway section was left intact in case the slate quarries re-opened and remained until finally lifted in 1948–9.

In 1943, the Ffestiniog Railway surrendered its lease and, in exchange for £550 compensation, it was allowed to keep 'Single Fairlie' Moel Tryfan (although it only paid £150).

Various legal manoeuvres followed this, including a serious application to turn the route into a long-distance footpath. Although these plans were ultimately unfruitful, the statutory powers ensured that the track bed was kept mainly intact, rather than sold off bit by bit, which would have made restoration much more difficult and potentially expensive. However, some parts, such as the sites of Rhyd Ddu and Dinas stations, were sold off.

=== Restoration ===
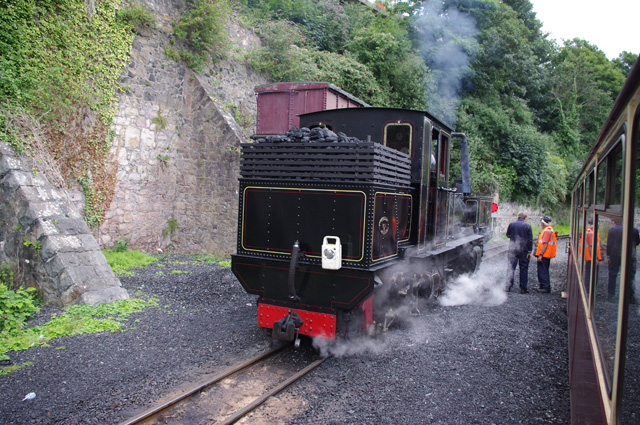
Welsh Highland Railway K1 at Caernarfon station

The Welsh Highland Railway's restoration has a long, complicated and controversial history and includes several court cases and public inquiries.

The origins of the WHRL restoration efforts tentatively began in 1961 after disagreements within the volunteers of the Festiniog Railway. Those volunteers who left the original group and a group of like-minded railway enthusiasts joined to form The Welsh Highland Railway Society. This group is the precursor of what eventually became WHR Ltd., which owns and operates the Welsh Highland Heritage Railway (WHHR). Legal problems meant they were unable to take over the old company so, in the 1970s, the group purchased the former standard gauge exchange sidings (the Beddgelert Siding) near Tremadog Road, Porthmadog, from British Railways to use as a base. In 1980, they began running passenger services over the line that is now known as the Welsh Highland Heritage Railway. They also acquired an original WHR locomotive Russell, which began working passenger services in 1987.

In the mid-1980s, a number of FR Co. employees became concerned about impact of possible competition from a rebuilt WHR and passed this view on to the FR management. In 1987, this resulted in a confidential offer to buy the WHR track bed from the official receiver for £16,000 to prevent the WHR being developed. In 1989, the offer became public, causing a backlash against the FR Co.

In 1990, a change of directors resulted in the FR Co.'s decision to take over the restoration of the WHR. After a long legal battle between the two companies, the FR Co. won control of the WHR track bed and it re-opened the railway in stages, starting in 1997. The line was completed in 2011.

=== Extension ===
With Caernarfon Council having a longer-term plan to reinstate the town's rail transport link to Bangor, speculation mounted that the FR/WHR would potentially later extend itself. However, the Ffestiniog Railway wrote to the council in January 2014 to confirm that they would not themselves be supportive of such a scheme in narrow gauge, but supported the reconnection of the town to the national rail network using standard gauge.

== The present day WHR ==
The modern Welsh Highland Railway is a tourist railway owned and operated by the Festiniog Railway Company. It is longer than the original line and starts from Caernarfon rather than Dinas. The extension was built on the track bed of the former standard gauge railway. Dinas station is also built on the standard gauge railway site, rather than the original narrow-gauge site, with the line moving onto the original WHR alignment just south of the station.

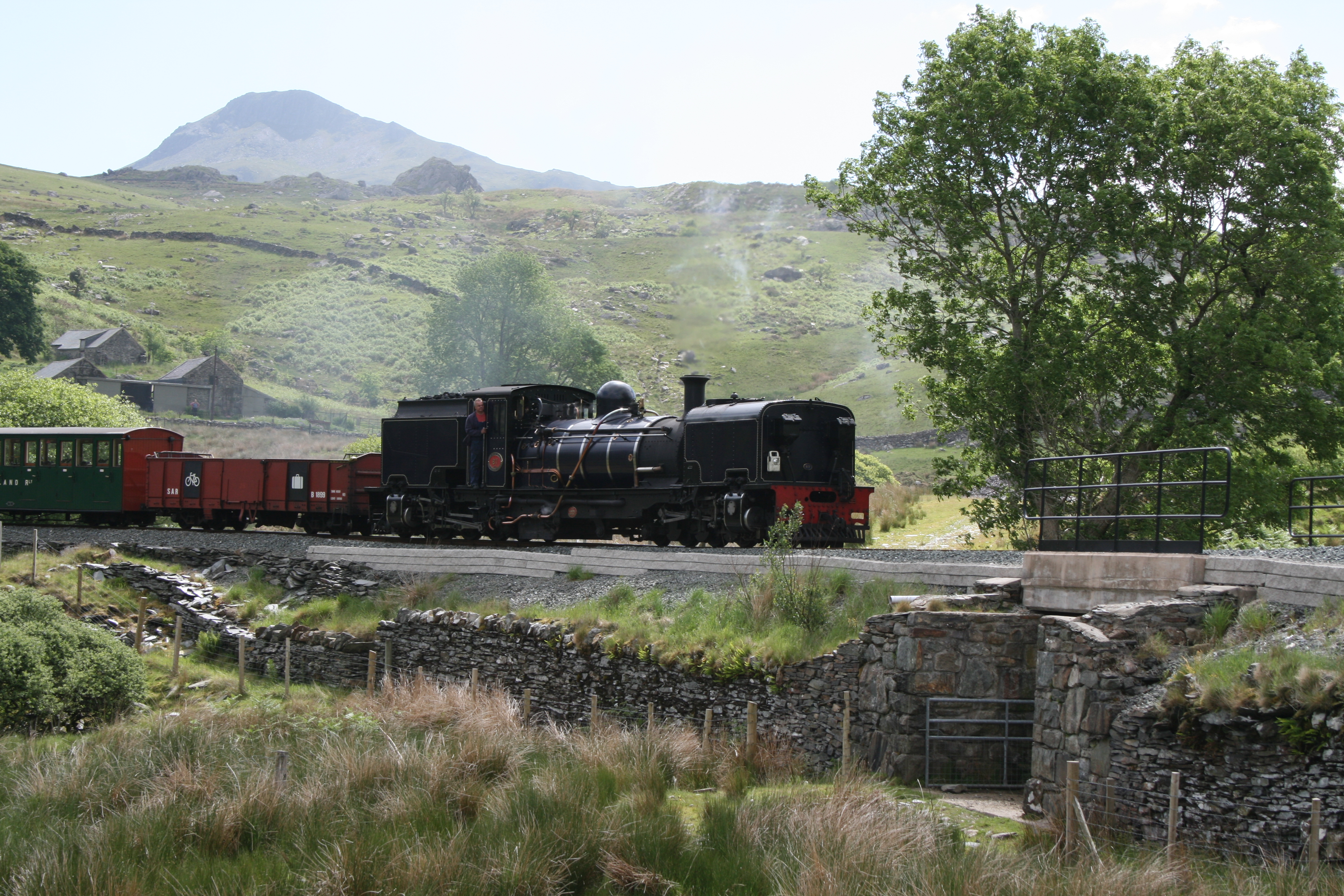
WHR NG87 in blue near Rhyd-Ddu

It is marketed by the FR Co. as The Welsh Highland Railway and Rheilffordd Eryri (In the Welsh language, Eryri = "Snowdonia"). The WHR's connection to the Ffestiniog Railway means that the FR Co. controls almost 40 miles of narrow-gauge railway and it promotes both lines jointly as the Ffestiniog and Welsh Highland Railways or Rheilffyrdd Ffestiniog ac Eryri.

== The Welsh Highland Heritage Railway ==
The Welsh Highland Heritage Railway (Welsh: Rheilffordd Ucheldir Cymru) is a 1 mi (1.6 km) long narrow-gauge heritage railway owned and operated by Welsh Highland Railway Ltd. (WHR Ltd.). It operates from its main station at Tremadog Road, Porthmadog to its terminus at Pen-y-Mount, where it connects to the Ffestiniog Railway Company owned Welsh Highland Railway.

WHR Ltd's primary focus is on recreating the atmosphere of the original Welsh Highland Railway. This includes replicas of original buildings, using original and replica carriages and rolling stock and the staff wearing period costume. It also has a museum at its Gelert's Farm Works and every train halts there on the return journey to allow passengers to visit it. There is also a miniature railway and a tea room at its main Porthmadog station.

=== Relationship with the Festiniog Railway Company ===
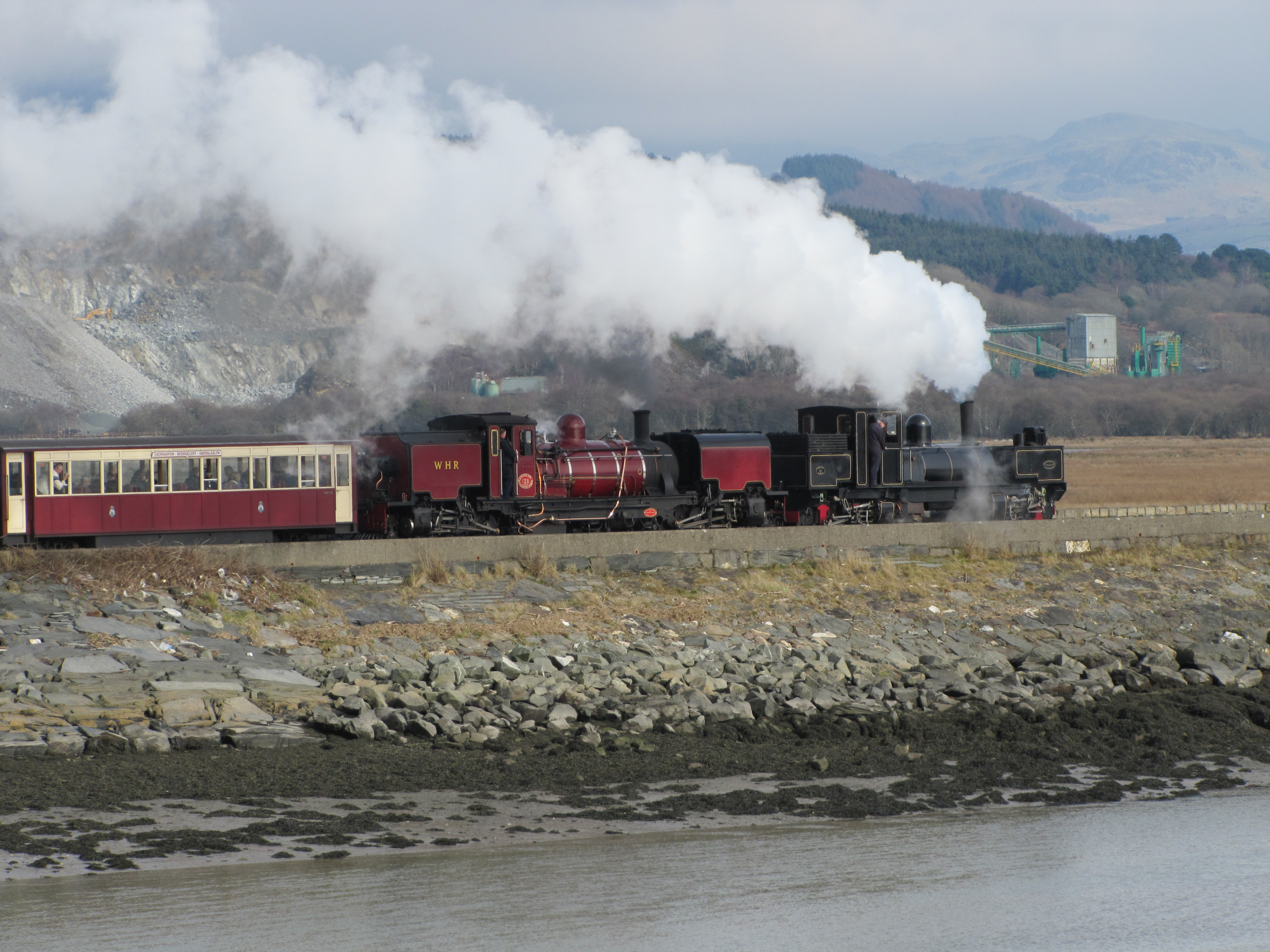
Porthmadog to Caernarfon train

Although WHR Ltd lost the battle for control of the WHR to the Festiniog Railway Company, they have also been involved in its restoration.

On 12 January 1998, both companies signed an agreement, commonly known as the "98 agreement". In return for dropping its objections to the Festiniog Railway Company's application to restore the railway; WHR Ltd would be allowed to construct the section of the railway from Pen y Mount to Pont Croesor and then operate their own services over it until such time as the "Head of Steel" arrived at Pont Croesor from the north. The Pen y Mount to Pont Croesor section would then be handed over to the FR's construction company for incorporation into the rest of the WHR. Finally, in between its principal services, the FR would then operate trains from the WHR Ltd's Porthmadog (WHHR) railway station to unspecified destinations on the WHR, using WHR Ltd locomotives, rolling stock and (where possible) WHR Ltd staff. Revenue from these trains would be retained by the FR, but they would, in turn, pay a hire fee for the use of the locomotive and rolling stock and a track access fee for the use of WHR Ltd's line between Porthmadog (WHR) and Pen y Mount.

Another key part of the agreement defined the names of the two companies' operations during the period that the line was restored. The FR Co. promoted their section as The Welsh Highland Railway (Caernarfon) (WHR C) and WHR Ltd. changed its operational name from The Welsh Highland Railway to The Welsh Highland Railway (Porthmadog) (WHR P). When the two sections were connected in 2008, WHR Ltd. changed its operational name to The Welsh Highland Heritage Railway and the FR Co. started to promote their operation as The Welsh Highland Railway or, in a largely Welsh-speaking area, Rheilffordd Eryri.

In the end, WHR Ltd was only able to build around a third of the way to Pont Croesor, with trains terminating at a location known as Traeth Mawr Loop (opened in 2007). The reasons behind this and the consequences, which continue to be a subject of debate, led directly to a breakdown of relations between the two companies in 2008. Since then efforts have been made to improve relations and these are still ongoing.

== Welsh name ==
The original railway did not have an official Welsh translation of its name, despite the fact that North Wales has always been a heartland for the Welsh language. Local people tended to refer to it by informal names such as Y Lein Bach or Lein Bach Beddgelert (the little Beddgelert railway).

The restored railway is known as Rheilffordd Eryri.

== Rolling stock ==
=== Original locomotives ===
Two locomotives were inherited from the predecessor companies: Moel Tryfan and Russell. When these proved insufficient, Baldwin 590 was acquired by H.F. Stephens and several Festiniog Railway locomotives saw regular use on the Welsh Highland Railway throughout its entire pre-closure existence from 1923 to 1937. 590 was planned to be part of a larger fleet to replace Moel Tryfan and Russell but it gained so little popularity that Stephens never bought another. By 1936 Moel Tryfan was out of use at Boston Lodge. When Russell and 590 were withdrawn the following year, they were placed in Dinas shed, but when the Second World War broke out, the Ministry of War came to see about appropriating them for the war effort. After some examination of the engines and questioning of those who had worked them, Russell (regarded as a good engine) was removed for further use, and 590 (seen as an unreliable, rough rider with difficult controls and inadequate adhesion) was broken up at Dinas. Despite the unpopularity of 590, the WHHR (Porthmadog) is currently refurbishing a similar Baldwin to act as a replica.

During the ownership of the WHR by the Festiniog Railway Company, Moel Tryfan and Russell were cut down to allow them to traverse the Festiniog Railway to Blaenau Ffestiniog. Moel Tryfan proved suitable, but Russell, even in cut down form, was not low or narrow enough to fit the FR's highly restrictive loading gauge. Russell is now owned by WHR Ltd and has been restored to its original profile. 590 notably retained its original form until its demise.

Name or Number	Wheel arrangement	Builder	Date built	Notes
Moel Tryfan	0-6-4T	Vulcan Foundry	1875	ex-North Wales Narrow Gauge Railways
Russell	2-6-2T	Hunslet Engine Company	1906	ex-Portmadoc, Beddgelert & South Snowdon Railway
590	4-6-0PT	Baldwin Locomotive Works USA	1917	ex-War Department Light Railways

== Operation ==
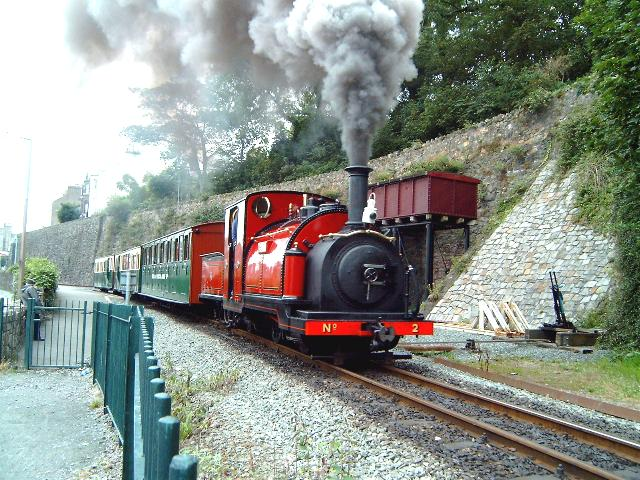
Ffestiniog Railway No. 2 Prince works the heritage set in 2002 on the WHR

The railway is a single track line with passing loops at Dinas, Waunfawr, Rhyd Ddu, Beddgelert and Pont Croesor halt. There is also a loop at Hafod y Llyn, which is normally locked out of use as a stabling point for engineering trains.

As with any single track railway, there are strict rules managing the movement of trains to prevent more than one entering a section. The line is managed from a single "Control" office at Boston Lodge Works, which also performs the same task for the Ffestiniog Railway. Control is responsible for the safe and efficient operation of trains, logs train movements on a train graph and acts as a single point of contact in emergencies. A system of tokens is used to control train access to single line sections.

Communication between train crew and Control always occurs using a landline at stations. There is no in-cab radio system and current regulations forbid use of such whilst in motion. As a backup system only, the guard carries a company mobile telephone for use in an emergency. This is not a primary system as cellular coverage is intermittent over the length of the line. His Majesty's Railway Inspectorate, the organisation responsible for safety on British railways, insists on landlines as the main form of safety critical communication.

=== Signalling ===
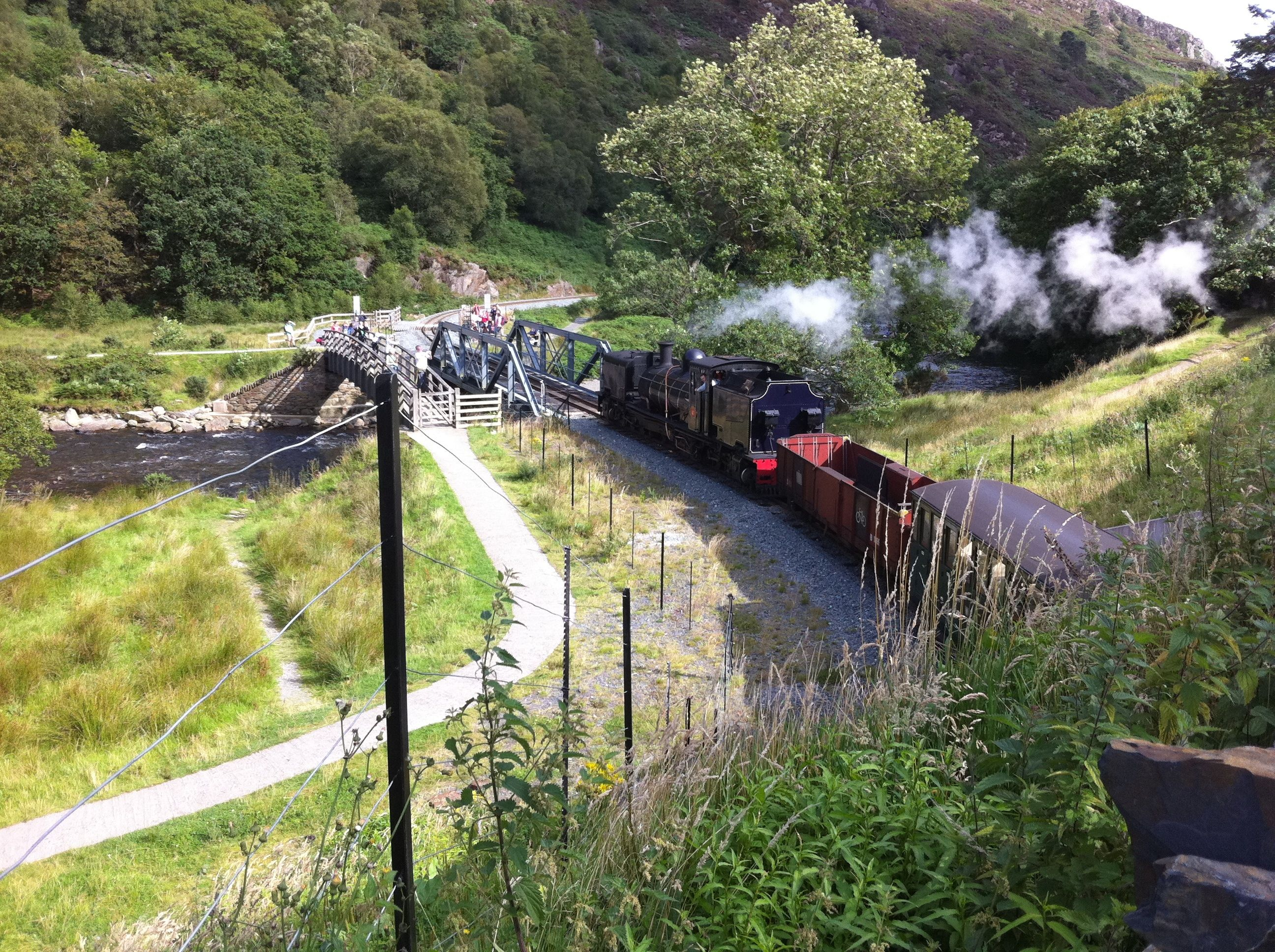
A WHR train with NG G16 No. 87 passing the bridge over Afon Glaslyn.

The WHR at present has two systems for block section control. The original staff and ticket system is slowly being phased out in favour of a more flexible Electronic Token System (ETS).

==== Staff and ticket ====
To enter any section of line still controlled by staff and ticket, the train crew must obtain permission from control and the relevant token. Each section of line is a token block section. The WHR uses the traditional staff and ticket system in which trains can either be issued with the section token staff or a numbered ticket. Tickets allow multiple trains to pass through a section in one direction one-at-a-time. The controller advises the train crew which method they will be using. Tickets are kept in a locked box opened by a key on the token staff. This means the last train must use the token staff to pass through the section, so it can be used for trains to travel in the opposite direction. For additional protection, both the footplate crew and the guard must see the token or ticket before the train can depart.

==== Electronic Token System ====
One of the disadvantages of the staff and ticket system is that it is very inflexible. If a locomotive fails in a station, for example, a token staff may be at the wrong end of a section and will have to be moved by road. This situation does not occur under the Electric Token System (ETS), a more advanced system in which tokens can be obtained at either end of a section from a token instrument.

ETS has been used on the Ffestiniog Railway for many years and the FR Co. were anxious to obtain enough ETS instruments to equip the WHR. After a long search, sufficient ETS equipment to operate the entire railway has been obtained from the Irish railway company Iarnród Éireann. The equipment became redundant after Iarnród Éireann modernised its signalling systems in the early 2000s.

During the reconstruction of the WHR it was believed that installing cabling along the track bed would not be needed and the decision was made not to install cable ducts under any of the crossings. As a result traditional ETS as it was originally designed could not be installed without considerable civil engineering to install new ducts along the railway. Subsequently the FR Co. developed a more modern alternative method of connecting the ETS machines over the internet called microETS.

==== Shunt token ====
At all intermediate stations an additional "Shunt" token is used to allow shunting to take place (such as a locomotive "running round" a train). The shunt token can only be withdrawn (used) with permission from Control and if there are no trains approaching the station in the adjacent single line sections. Withdrawing the token prevents other trains from entering the station.

==== ATOTP ====
The majority of the points at passing loops are operated automatically using the Automatic Train Operated Trailable Points (ATOTP) system, rather than a manually operated lever or point motor. These work via a weighted lever and hydraulic ram located in a cabinet to the side of the points. When a train is entering a station the weight holds the points in the normal position, allowing a train to pass over without a traditional facing point lock (FPL). When a train has obtained a token and has permission to leave the station loop it trails through the points, pushing them into the desired position, and causing the weighted lever to be lifted. In order to minimize damage to the points and wheel flanges of the rolling stock the hydraulic ram is used to slowly lower the weight back into its resting position over the course of 15–18 seconds.

==== Cae Pawb – The Cambrian crossing ====
Just outside Porthmadog, the railway crosses the Network Rail-owned Cambrian Coast Line using a flat crossing. It existed on the old Welsh Highland Railway and was the source of much conflict between the old company and the Great Western Railway over the cost of WHR trains using the crossing. On the modern WHR, the crossing is called Cae Pawb. Cae Pawb means "everybody's field" and is a reference to the nearby field of allotments.

Information, from the engineers involved, is that the Network Rail line crosses on solid steel billets to the same head, foot and height measurements as the adjacent standard gauge rail, but that the narrow gauge crosses on rail of a similar section which is joined on either side in succession to 80 lb/yd (36 kg/m) rail and then to the normal 60 lb/yd (30 kg/m) rail used for the narrow gauge.

Cae Pawb is at the north-western end of the Network Rail Harlech to Porthmadog signalling section, which is controlled from Machynlleth Control Centre. Standard gauge trains are protected by signals and wide-to-gauge trap points on the WHR line, which are interlocked with the standard gauge European Rail Traffic Management System (ERTMS) signalling. The crossing is activated locally and ERTMS automatically gives permission for WHR trains to cross provided the standard gauge section is available. A crossing controller operates the crossing when passenger trains are running, with operation at other times being carried out by the train crew.

A set of replica white wooden crossing gates separate the narrow-gauge line from the standard gauge track and continue the Network Rail boundary fencing. They are left open when a crossing controller is present. The gates open inwards to prevent them blocking the standard gauge line. A replica signal box was constructed for this crossing but has now been installed at Pen y Mount to control the junction with the Welsh Highland Heritage Railway.

==== Porthmadog cross-town link ====
South of the Cambrian crossing, WHR cross town link trains move direct to Porthmadog Harbour, where passengers alight.

At Harbour Station there is a platform between the Welsh Highland and Ffestiniog lines so that passengers may transfer from one train to the other. There are also the usual facilities including a respectable eating house.

=== Timetable ===
Historically, the WHR was split into two operational sections:

- Dinas to Beddgelert and Beddgelert to Porthmadog (using present day form)

For the 2009 timetable operation, a "two set" operation was employed, with rolling stock being based at Dinas. During the year, operations were extended from Rhyd Ddu: first to Beddgelert on 7 April 2009, and then to Hafod y Llyn on 21 May 2009, site of a small halt on the original line. Although passengers could board and alight at Hafod-y-Llyn, its remote location meant that it could only be accessed by self-sufficient walkers and cyclists as there were no parking or other facilities at the halt and the platform was very short. It closed when Pont Croesor was opened in 2010.

The Festiniog Railway Company had, at one point, planned to open the entire railway in 2007. Delays from government processes, an epidemic of foot-and-mouth disease and funding restrictions meant that the opening was repeatedly delayed, with the full opening not happening until 2011. The line could not be opened to Beddgelert until the track left the national park at Pont Ynysferlas; this restriction was imposed by the Snowdonia National Park Authority to be sure that the railway really meant what it said, but this suspicious attitude lost the railway a year's income from Beddgelert. From the end of May 2010, the line was extended a further 3 miles (4.8 km) to Pont Croesor. Shortly thereafter the railway announced that as it had approval for service by the Safety Directorate of the Office of Rail Regulation (ORR), the remaining section would be completed before the end of September 2010. The cause of this sudden rush was the transition from legislation enshrined in the Railways and Other Transport Systems (Approval of Works, Plant and Equipment) Regulations 1994 (ROTS) to new legislation enshrined in the Railways and Other Guided Transport Systems (Safety) Regulations 2006 (ROGS). This should have happened in 2006, but heritage railways gained an extension of the transition period to 1 October 2010. It was foreseen that this change in regime would bring additional costs to the railway, so it was decided to complete the line before that date. A minor delay was incurred by the necessity to build a new culvert where the new Porthmadog A487 bypass road was being built.

Following the visit from the ORR on 15 October 2010, approval was given for passenger operation. On 30 October 2010 the first passenger trains, departing from Caernarfon to Porthmadog and return, were operated for the benefit of sponsors of the project. The commissioning of the ERTMS signalling on the Cambrian Line was completed during a possession from Harlech to Pwllheli between 24 and 27 October.

As a result of the A487 Porthmadog bypass works, the Ffestiniog Railway was severed just east of Minffordd station from 3 January to 16 February 2011 to build a new bridge. Therefore, the regular winter FR trains were scheduled to operate from Porthmadog to Hafod y Llyn. The first through services between Caernarfon and Porthmadog Harbour station began on 19 February 2011, with regular services recommencing from 27 March 2011.

=== Whole of line operations ===
Although, with completion of the main track laying it is now possible to run trains from Caernarfon through to Blaenau Ffestiniog, there are initially no plans to do so on a regular basis. The WHR is built to a slightly larger loading gauge than the Ffestiniog Railway and therefore through trains would, of necessity, be exclusively of FR stock.

=== Accidents and incidents ===
- On 4 March 1881, a passenger train was blown off the line near Snowdon Ranger Halt. The sole passenger on board was injured.
- On 10 June 2018, whilst hauling a passenger train, locomotive 143 was derailed near Clogwyn y Gwin South foot crossing due to the failure of part of the suspension of the front bogie. There were no injuries amongst the 74 passengers and seven staff on board.
- On 16 April 2019, the diesel locomotive Vale of Ffestiniog passed a signal at danger and entered a single line section without authority while travelling light engine from Dinas to Porthmadog. The locomotive did not have sufficient brake force to stop on the steep downhill gradient through Beddgelert, as a result of in-house modifications to the brake system and poor adhesion conditions. There were no injuries, and no damage was caused.
- On 19 December 2021 a derailment occurred on the bogie of the fourth passenger coach (no. 125), just after crossing Brynyfelin River Bridge. The line was closed for two days to recover the train.

== Stations ==
=== Original ===
- Dinas
- Tryfan Junction
  - Rhostryfan
  - Bryngwyn
- Waunfawr
- Bettws Garmon
- Salem Halt
- Plas-y-Nant
- Snowdon Ranger (aka Quellyn Lake)
- Rhyd Ddu (aka South Snowdon)
- Pitts Head
- Hafod Ruffydd Halt
- Beddgelert
- Nantmor
- Hafod-y-Llyn Halt
- Hafod Garregog Halt
- Croesor Junction
- Ynysfor Halt
- Pont Croesor
- Portmadoc New (1933) station
- Portmadoc New (1923) station
- Porthmadog Harbour

=== Restored Welsh Highland Railway / Rheilffordd Eryri ===
- Caernarfon 0 miles (0 km) Inaugural Train departed 11 October 1997
- Bontnewydd
- Dinas 2.7 miles (4.3 km)
- Tryfan Junction Sponsors' Train stopped here in 2010. Reopened in 2011.
- Waunfawr 6.5 miles (10.4 km)
- Plas-y-Nant
- Snowdon Ranger
- Rhyd Ddu 12.1 miles (19.4 km)
- Meillionen (Forest Campsite)
- Beddgelert 16.8 miles (27.0 km)
- Nantmor (opened 27 May 2010)
- Hafod y Llyn (closed)
- Pont Croesor 22.3 miles (35.9 km) (opened 27 May 2010)
- Pen-y-Mount Junction 23.9 miles (38.4 km) (not open, WHR platform to be built)
- Porthmadog Harbour 24.7 miles (39.7 km) Inaugural Train arrived 30 October 2010

=== Welsh Highland Heritage Railway / Rheilffordd Ucheldir Cymru ===
- Porthmadog (WHHR)
- Gelert's Farm Halt
- Pen-y-Mount Junction (current terminus)
- Traeth Mawr Loop (Never a station. Temporary terminus loop in 2007 & 2008, now removed.)

== See also ==
- British narrow-gauge railways
- Slate operations on the Welsh Highland Railway
- South African Class NG G16 2-6-2+2-6-2
- South African Class NG15 2-8-2
- Two foot gauge railways in South Africa

== Bibliography ==
- Boyd, James I.C. (1988) [1972]. Narrow Gauge Railways in South Caernarvonshire – Volume 1. Headington: The Oakwood Press. ISBN 978-0-85361-365-7. OCLC 20417464.
- Boyd, James I.C. (1989) [1972]. Narrow Gauge Railways in South Caernarvonshire - Volume 2: The Welsh Highland Railway. Headington: The Oakwood Press. ISBN 978-0-85361-383-1. OCLC 145018679.
- Carter, Ian (2008). British Railway Enthusiasm. Manchester: Manchester University Press. ISBN 978-0-7190-6566-8.
- Hopkins, John C. (2003). Rheilffordd Eryri/The Welsh Highland Railway: 1991 to 2003, 4th edition 388pp. The author.
- Johnson, Peter (2002). An Illustrated History of the Welsh Highland Railway. Hersham: Oxford Publishing Co. ISBN 978-0-86093-565-0. OCLC 59498388.
- Johnson, Peter (1999). Portrait of The Welsh Highland Railway. Ian Allan Publishing. ISBN 978-0-7110-2658-2. OCLC 41018741.
- Turner, Alun (2003). The Welsh Highland Railway: A History, 4th edition. Stenlake Publishing. ISBN 978-1-84033-263-6.
- Waite, James (2023). Narrow Gauge Through Porthmadog. Narrow Gauge Album No. 6. Chippenham, Wilts, UK: Mainline & Maritime. ISBN 9781900340861.
- Whitehouse, P.B. (1969). Steam on the Shed. Shepperton: Ian Allan Publishing. ISBN 978-0-7110-0080-3.
