= Dinas railway station =

Heritage railway station in Wales

Dinas
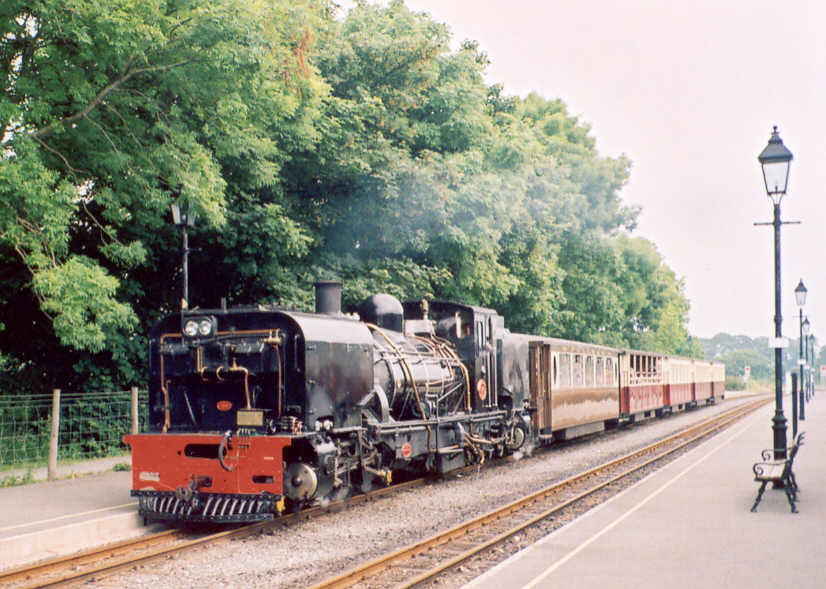
- Welsh Highland train to Waunfawr at Dinas 2003

General information
- Location: Dinas, Llanwnda, Gwynedd; Wales
- Coordinates: 53.10366°N 4.27682°W
- Grid reference: SH476586
- System: Station on heritage railway
- Owner: Festiniog Railway Company
- Manager: Welsh Highland Railway
- Platforms: 2 (originally 2 standard and 1 narrow gauge)

History
- Original company: LNWR

Key dates
- 14 September 1877: Opened as "Dinas Junction"
- 26 September 1936: Narrow gauge closed
- 1938: Renamed "Dinas (Caerns)"
- 10 September 1951: Standard gauge closed
- 11 October 1997: Re-opened (as narrow gauge, named "Dinas")
Location

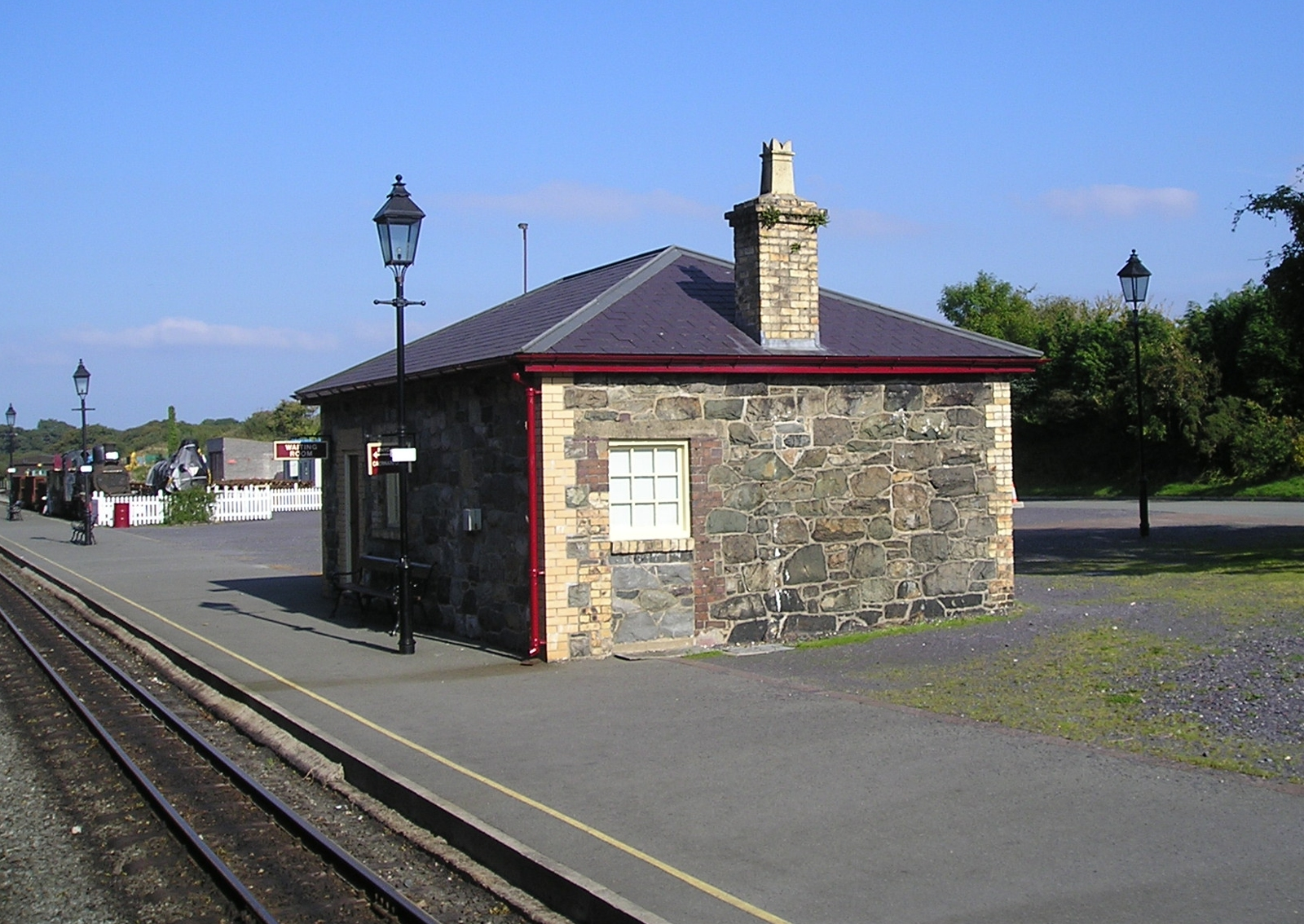
Original NWNGR station building of 1877

Dinas is a station on the narrow gauge Welsh Highland Railway, which was built in 1877 as the North Wales Narrow Gauge Railways Moel Tryfan Undertaking to carry dressed slate for trans-shipment to the LNWR. Passenger services ceased on 26 September 1936 until which time Dinas had been a joint station, known as Dinas Junction with the LNWR and later the LMS. In 1951, British Railways closed their part of the station but the line through the station remained open until the line from Caernarvon to Afon Wen was closed in 1964. The trackbed was subsequently developed as the Lôn Eifion tourist cycle route.

When the station was reopened on 11 October 1997, it was as the southern temporary terminus of the extended and soon to be restored Welsh Highland Railway from Caernarfon. Following reconstruction of the trackbed, the line was reopened on its original trackbed, in stages; on 7 August 2000 to Waunfawr; in 2003 to Rhyd Ddu; through the Aberglaslyn Pass to Beddgelert and Hafod-y-lyn in 2009; 26 May 2010 for Pont Croesor and finally on 4 January 2011 to Porthmadog. The official opening for the completed line was 20 April 2011. The train services are operated by the Festiniog Railway Company by its Welsh Highland Railway subsidiary.

At Dinas, the new narrow gauge platforms are built on the site of the former standard gauge platforms. Two buildings survive from the North Wales Narrow Gauge Railways era, namely the former goods shed and the original station building which has been carefully restored. Dinas station yards house the Welsh Highland Railway offices, carriage sheds and locomotive depot as well as extensive civil engineering works and sidings.

Preceding station	Heritage railways	Following station
Bontnewydd towards Caernarfon	Welsh Highland Railway	Tryfan Junction towards Porthmadog Harbour
Historical railways
Terminus	Welsh Highland Railway	Tryfan Junction
Carnarvon (Pant); Line partly open as narrow gauge; Station closed	Carnarvonshire Railway; 1867-71	Llanwnda; Line and station closed
Caernarvon; Line partly open as narrow gauge; Station closed	Carnarvonshire Railway; 1871 onwards	Llanwnda; Line and Station closed

== Further material ==
- Clemens, Jim (2003) [1959-67]. North Wales Steam Lines No. 6 (DVD). Uffington, Shropshire: B&R Video Productions. BRVP No 79.
- Smith, Martin, ed. (May 2011). "The Nantlle Tramway". Railway Bylines. Vol. 16, no. 6. Clophill: Irwell Press. pp. 306–313. ISSN 1360-2098.
