= Porthmadog Harbour railway station =

Heritage railway station in Gwynedd, Wales

Porthmadog Harbour
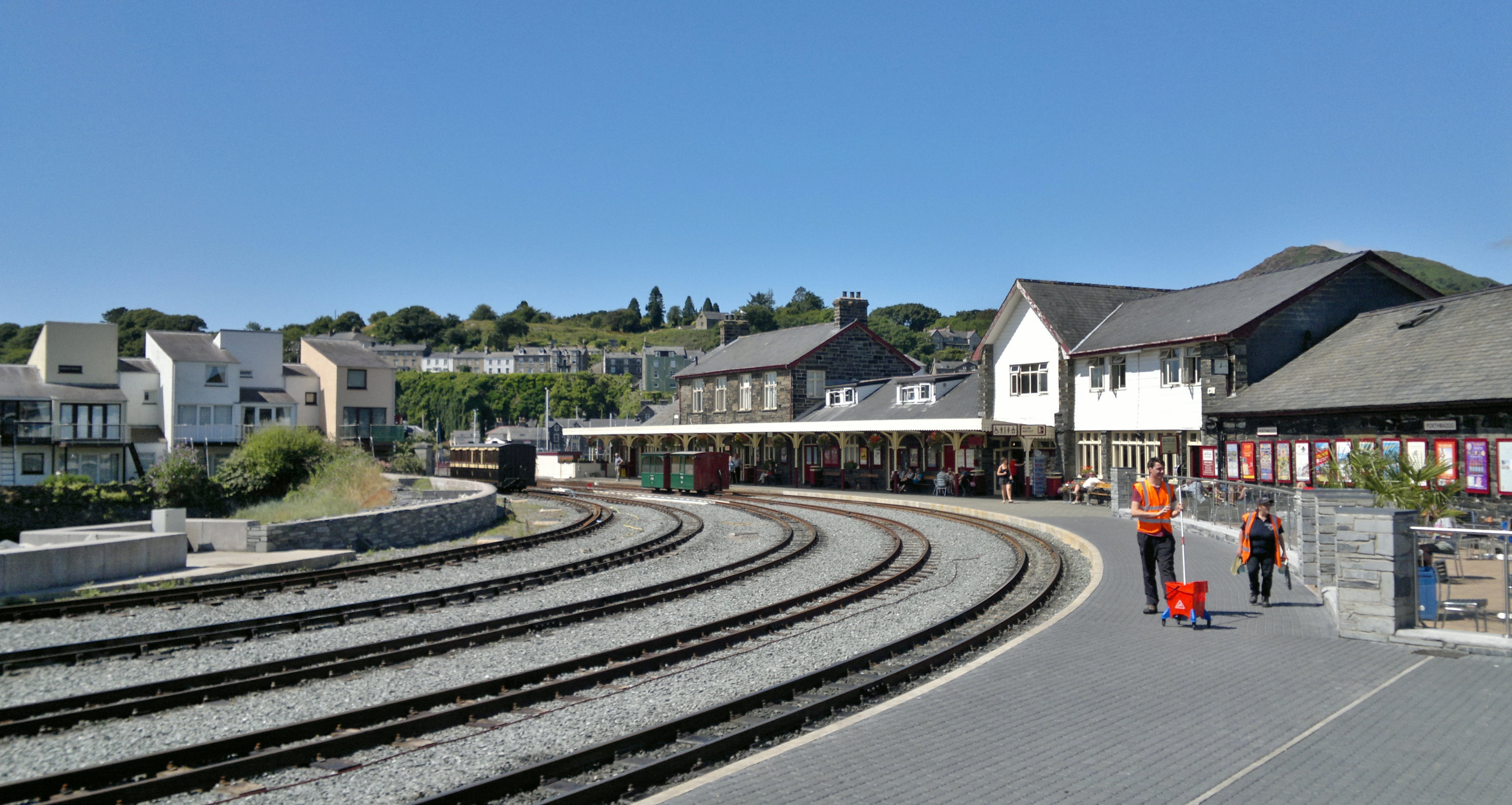
- Porthmadog Harbour station (2014)

General information
- Location: Porthmadog, Gwynedd, Wales
- Coordinates: 52.9239°N 4.1270°W
- Grid reference: SH571384
- System: Station on heritage railway
- Owner: Festiniog Railway Company
- Manager: Ffestiniog Railway
- Platforms: 2

Key dates
- 6 January 1865: Station opened
- 1923: Welsh Highland Railway services commence
- 1936: Welsh Highland Railway services cease
- 15 September 1939: Closed for passengers
- 23 July 1955: Reopened for passengers
- 19 February 2011: Reopened to Welsh Highland Railway services
Location

Porthmadog Harbour railway station serves the town of Porthmadog, in Gwynedd, Wales. It is the southern passenger terminus of two narrow gauge railways: the Ffestiniog Railway, which was opened in 1836 to carry dressed slate from the Quarries around Blaenau Ffestiniog to the sea port of Porthmadog, for export by sea; and the Welsh Highland Railway, incorporated in 1923, which ran to Dinas. After rebuilding over the period from 1997 to 2011, the northern terminus of the Welsh Highland Railway is now at Caernarfon, in sight of its castle.

== History ==
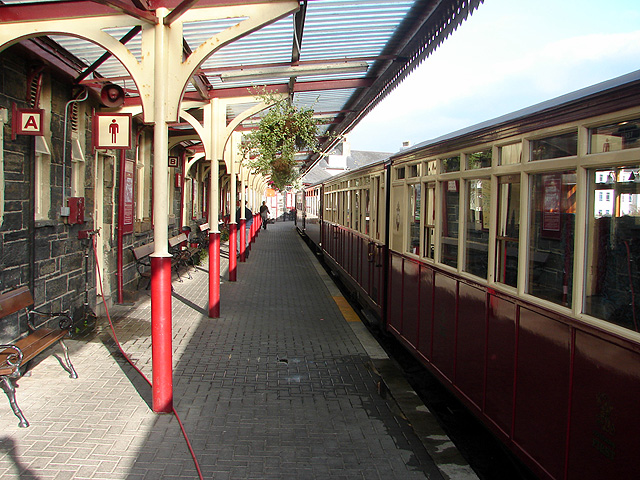
A Ffestiniog Railway train at Porthmadog Harbour

The station is built at the western end of the Cob, the great embankment across the Traeth Mawr, on a peninsula from Ynys Madoc constructed in 1842 to form a slate wharf and a harbour wall. It was opened for passenger service on 6 January 1865.

Welsh Highland Railway (WHR) trains served the station from 1923, with a short period when all passenger traffic was diverted to Portmadog New station, near to the crossing with the Cambrian railway, that building being long since demolished. The ill-funded WHR closed in 1936. Harbour station was closed to passengers on 15 September 1939, although slate trains continued operating through the Second World War until 1946. The buildings continued to be in use as the principal offices of the Festiniog Railway Company and the home of the manager (Mr Robert Evans), including throughout the years of almost total closure from 1 August 1946 to 24 September 1954. The station reopened for passengers on 23 July 1955.

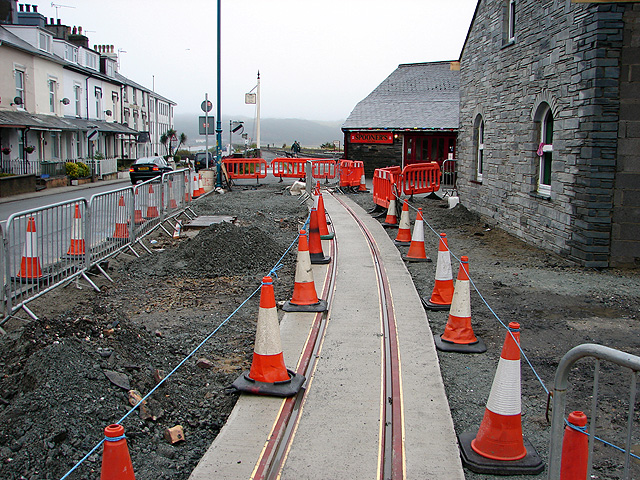
Construction of the Cross Town Rail Link outside of the station (2011)

Since 2011, following completion of the Cross Town Rail Link (CTRL), the station is also the terminus of the WHR, which is owned by the Festiniog Railway Company. This line runs trains through the town to Beddgelert, Rhyd Ddu, Waunfawr, Dinas and Caernarfon. The WHR was closed to all traffic in 1936 and the track lifted during the war, but has been entirely rebuilt and even extended. Starting from Caernarfon in 1997, the final section from Pont Croesor was connected in 2009, with regular passenger services resuming in 2011.

== Buildings ==
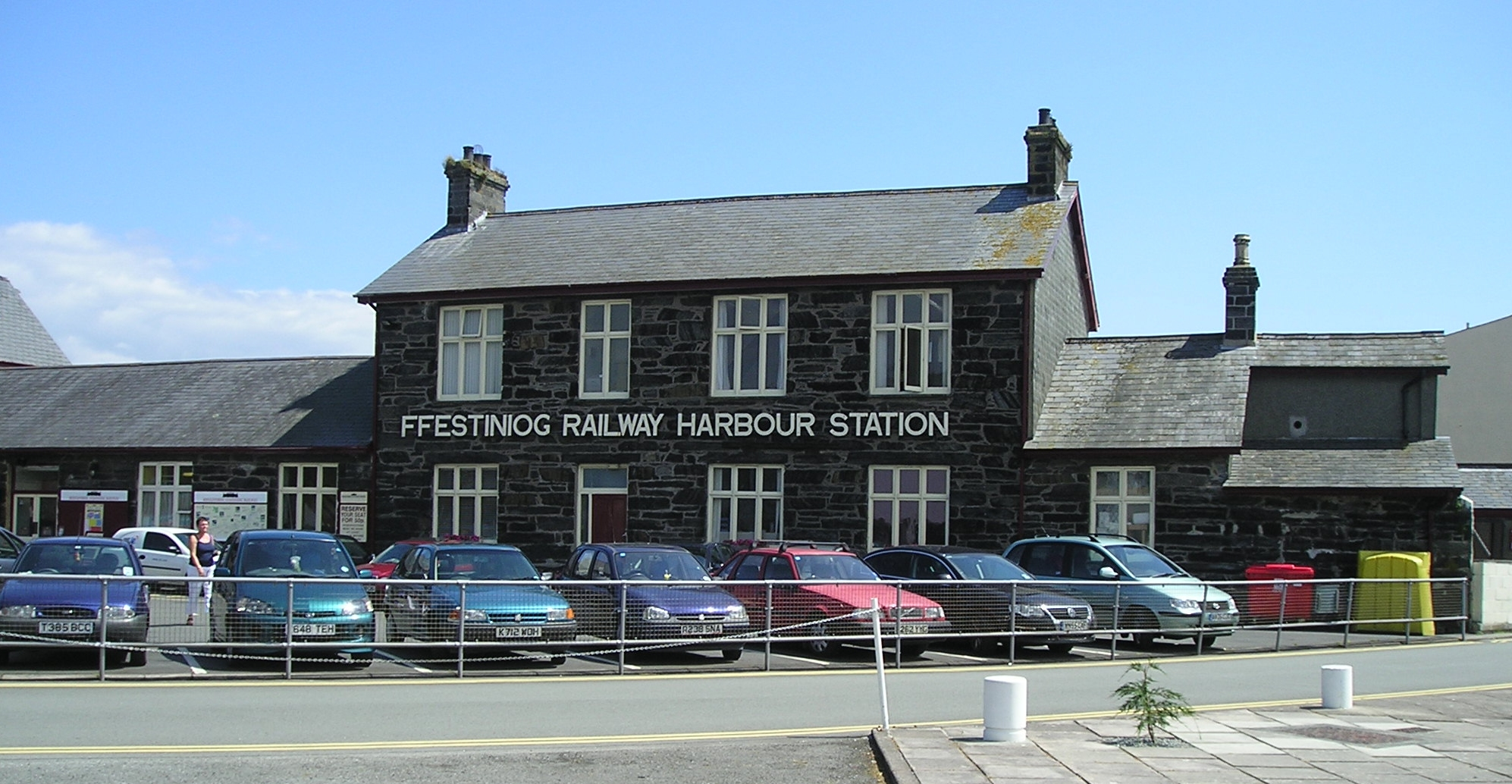
The front face of the station

The present stone buildings date from 1878/9, replacing earlier wooden buildings which were dismantled and reused elsewhere on the railway. The goods shed was added in 1880. The buildings were linked by a major extension in 1975. Passenger facilities include a booking and enquiry office, a large tourist and hobby shop, and a restaurant with licensed bar. The erection of the platform awning was completed in 1988.

Harbour station is the head office and operational headquarters of the Festiniog Railway Company, which is marketed as Ffestiniog and Welsh Highland Railways.

== Operations ==
With the resumption of services in 1955, all traffic on the line has been controlled from an office in Harbour station, known simply as "Control". This office is staffed constantly when passenger-carrying services are in operation, other than some early morning and late night movements by works trains. Its remit was expanded in 1997 with the commencement of public services on the Welsh Highland Railway between Caernarfon and Dinas, and its subsequent expansion south towards Porthmadog.

Additionally, in 2007/8, when a connection was in use with the Welsh Highland Heritage Railway (WHHR), there was a requirement to co-ordinate with its operations on the new main line.

From 2011, with the WHR now connected to the station via the CTRL, a new short platform and point work was added to the eastward side of the existing platform structure/Spooners Bar. This was too short to hold the longer WHR trains, which were pulled onto the Cob; then a pilot locomotive was attached to the rear to drag the complete WHR train into the station. This operation was reversed on departure; due to the need for both lines to use the Cob and the single platform, only one train could be in the station at any time. This was always a temporary solution, until funds could be found to rebuild the station.

Having foreseen this problem, the Ffestiniog Railway (FR) proposed a £1.3m rebuild of Harbour station, to provide two separate and individually controllable platforms, each with their own run-round loops. The project took three years to complete, requiring extension of the Cob structure into the Irish Sea, compacting, extension of the platform, and finally a shift westwards of the alignment of the existing single platform and FR storage loops and sidings.

A helpful grant from the Terminal Stations Improvement Scheme was arranged by the Welsh Government. Completed in March 2014 within the projected cost, the project also provided two platforms and a new electronically controlled signal box, with a distinct FR heritage appearance. The project won the Signalling Award at the 2014 National Railway Heritage Awards.

== Services ==
Preceding station	Heritage railways	Following station
Terminus	Ffestiniog Railway	Boston Lodge Halt towards Blaenau Ffestiniog
Pont Croesor towards Caernarfon	Welsh Highland Railway	Terminus
Pen-y-Mount Junction towards Caernarfon	Welsh Highland Railway Special events only	Terminus
Change for the Welsh Highland Heritage Railway at Porthmadog (WHRR)
National Rail
Interchange with Porthmadog on the Cambrian Line

== See also ==
- Porthmadog railway station
- Porthmadog (WHHR) railway station
