= Gelert's Farm Halt railway station =

Heritage railway station in Gwynedd, Wales

Gelert's Farm Halt
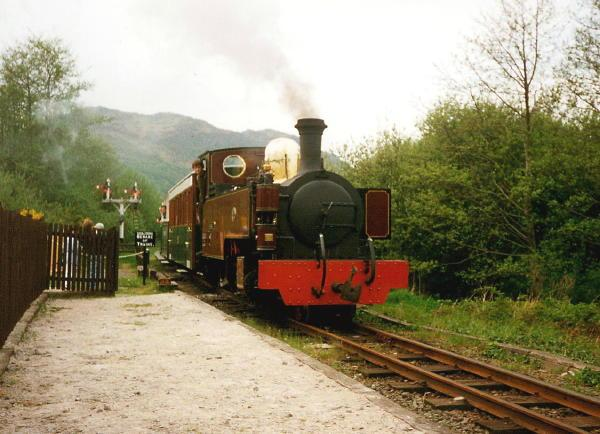
- Russell arriving at the halt (1995)

General information
- Location: Porthmadog, Gwynedd, Wales
- Coordinates: 52.93115°N 4.12861°W
- Grid reference: SH567391
- System: Station on heritage railway
- Owner: WHR Ltd
- Manager: Welsh Highland Heritage Railway
- Platforms: 1

History
- Opened: 1988
Location

Gelert's Farm Halt is a heritage railway station on the Welsh Highland Heritage Railway in north Wales. Opened in 1988, it is a simple platform alongside the main shed at Gelert's Farm Works, which is the railway's operating centre.

== History ==
The platform was rebuilt and extended in 2006.

In early 2007, the platform was extended a further 40 ft (12 m) in the northerly direction and a ramp constructed to enter the North Yard. A water supply has been installed at the southern end of the platform for watering steam locomotives.

== Service ==
Services only run on specific days of the year, mostly in the summer for the tourist trade. Operating dates are specified when there is a steam or diesel service.

The halt is a request stop for trains in the Pen-y-Mount direction; all trains in the Porthmadog direction stop at the halt for the passengers to visit the railway heritage centre.

Preceding station	Heritage railways	Following station
Porthmadog (WHHR) Terminus	Welsh Highland Heritage Railway	Pen-y-Mount Junction Terminus
