= Pont Croesor railway station =

Heritage railway station in Wales

Pont Croesor
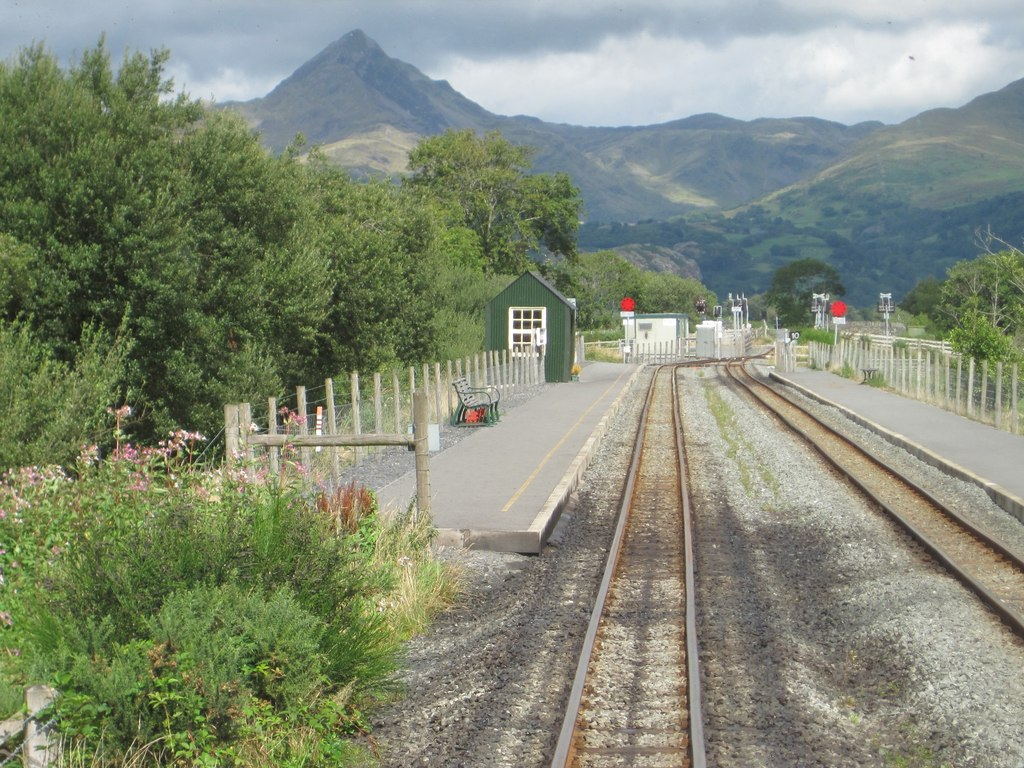
- The station looking north towards Nantmor and Caernarfon in 2013

General information
- Location: Porthmadog, Gwynedd; Wales
- Coordinates: 52.95058°N 4.09684°W
- Grid reference: SH592413
- System: Station on heritage railway
- Owner: Festiniog Railway Company
- Manager: Welsh Highland Railway
- Platforms: 2

History
- Original company: Croesor Tramway

Key dates
- 1923: first station opened
- 1936: first station closed
- 22 May 2010: First passenger trains at present station
- 26 May 2010: Official opening
- 30 October 2010: First crossing of passengers trains
- 8 January 2011: Start of timetabled services south of Pont Croesor
Location

Pont Croesor is a railway halt in Wales, on the Welsh Highland Railway, which runs through the Snowdonia National Park from Caernarfon to Porthmadog. It is located on the section between the stations of Hafod y Llyn and Pen-y-Mount Junction.

Originally, as part of the Croesor Tramway, there was a siding at this location but no station. When the WHR was initially built in 1923 a small halt was provided; however, this closed with the railway in 1936 and all trace of this was removed when the line was lifted.

The line from Pont Croesor to Porthmadog Harbour has been connected since early 2009, being available for stock transfer purposes. The station was officially opened on 26 May 2010 and was the WHR's temporary terminus, having previously opened to passengers on 22 May 2010. The previous terminus at Hafod y Llyn is now closed.

It opened to timetabled passenger services on 8 January 2011.

When the station opened there was a full-length platform on the west side of the loop only, but with the commencement of through services in both directions during 2011 a second platform was provided. The station site is adjacent to Pont Croesor bridge, which crosses the River Glaslyn, and is a hybrid road/rail bridge, as each uses the same piers. The bridge was extensively modified in appearance recently to feature standard safety barriers. The new loop was finally completed, for operational purposes, on 13 March 2010.

During the 2010 and 2011 seasons the station has featured a staffed booking office and gift shop; however with all trains terminating at Porthmadog for the 2012 season Pont Croesor is no longer a terminus, and has therefore been downgraded to an unstaffed halt. The station building has been removed to Blaenau Ffestiniog but the waiting room remains.

Preceding station	Heritage railways	Following station
Porthmadog Harbour Terminus	Welsh Highland Railway	Nantmor towards Caernarfon
Pen-y-Mount Junction towards Porthmadog Harbour	Welsh Highland Railway Special events only	Nantmor towards Caernarfon
Historical railways
Portmadoc New (1923) station Portmadoc New (1933) station	Welsh Highland Railway	Ynysfor Halt

== Ospreys ==
The station is adjacent to the viewing site of the Glaslyn Osprey Project, from where the public can see the nesting place of a pair of ospreys. Chicks have been successfully raised every year since 2005. The majority of the WHR's construction in this area has been carried out whilst the birds are abroad in the winter months, in order to keep disturbance to a minimum.

== See also ==
- Ospreys in Britain
