= Welsh Highland Heritage Railway =

Preserved railway at Porthmadog, Wales

Coordinates: 52°55′54″N 4°07′37″W

Welsh Highland Heritage Railway Rheilffordd Ucheldir Cymru (Welsh)
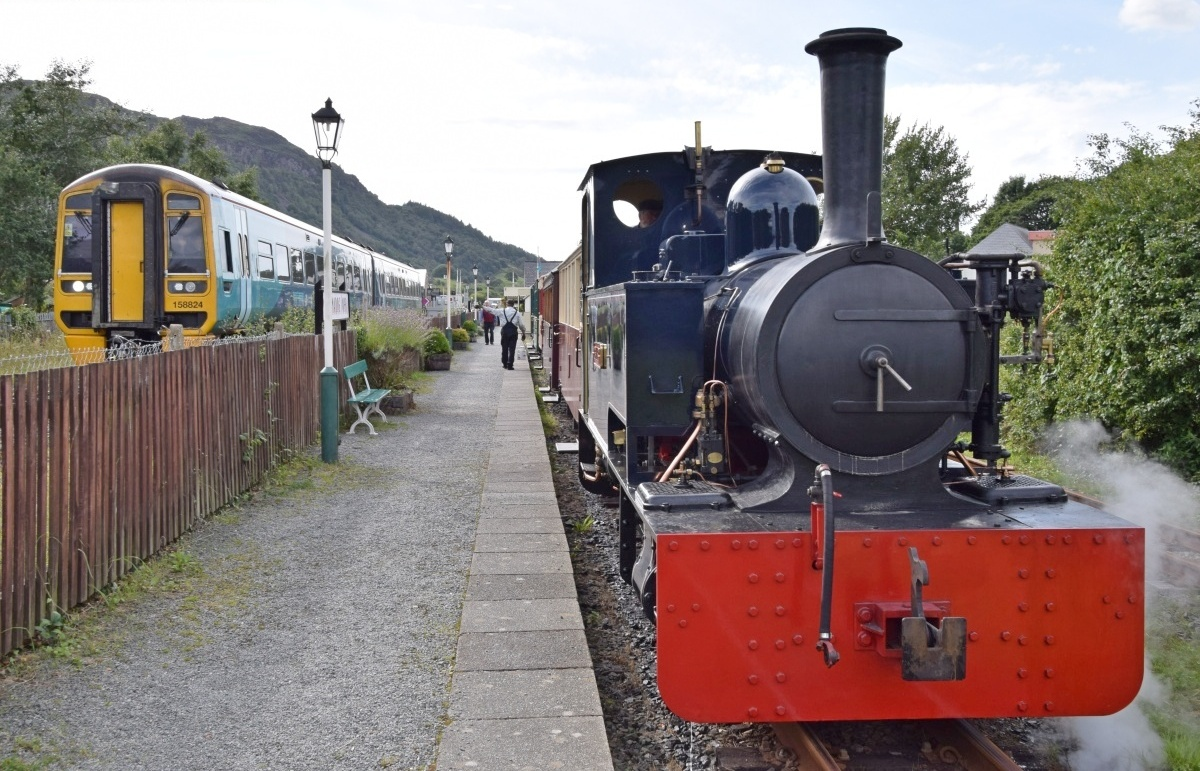
- Bagnall 3050 Gelert at Porthmadog alongside a Cambrian line train
- Locale: Wales
- Terminus: Porthmadog and Pen y Mount

Commercial operations
- Name: Welsh Highland Railway Ltd
- Built by: Welsh Highland Railway Ltd
- Original gauge: 1 ft 11 1/2 in (597 mm)

Preserved operations
- Owned by: Welsh Highland Railway Ltd
- Operated by: Welsh Highland Heritage Railway
- Stations: 3
- Length: 1 mile (1.6 km)
- Preserved gauge: 600 mm (1 ft 11 5/8 in)

Commercial history
- Opened: 1980

Preservation history
- 1961: Welsh Highland Railway Society formed
- 1964: WHR Society reformed as Welsh Highland Light Railway (1964) Limited
- 1980: WHR Ltd opened for passenger service
- 1987: Original locomotive Russell restored
- 2003: Original locomotive Russell taken out of service for expensive major overhaul.
- 2005: Celebrates 25 years of passenger train service
- 2007: Extended to Traeth Mawr
- 2008: Last train to Traeth Mawr
- 2009: Operational name changed to Welsh Highland Heritage Railway. Terminus reverts to Pen y Mount.
- 2014: Original locomotive Russell back in service.

The Welsh Highland Heritage Railway, legally Welsh Highland Railway Limited, is a 1 mile (1.6 km) heritage railway in Porthmadog, Gwynedd, Wales. It is built on a converted siding of the Cambrian Line, and aims to reconstruct the atmosphere of the original Welsh Highland Railway, though it uses no original trackbed.

== History ==
The origins of the WHHR lie in a small group of railway enthusiasts, including some disgruntled volunteers from the Ffestiniog Railway, forming the Welsh Highland Railway Society in 1961, to preserve and rebuild the original Welsh Highland Railway which had operated from 1922 to 1936.

Land running alongside the Cambrian Coast line at Beddgelert Siding was acquired from British Railways in December 1972. Work started on construction of the railway in 1973. A substantial works and engineering facility was constructed on the site of the former farm that was situated in the triangle of land between the Beddgelert Siding, the Cambrian Coast Railway and the original Welsh Highland Railway trackbed. The works have been expanded with newly constructed sheds and the re-use of some of the original agricultural buildings, which include one of the oldest buildings in Porthmadog. A museum of narrow gauge railways is part to the works tour and from 2009, with the construction of a new building, this has more than doubled in size.

The original Welsh Highland Railway has been reconstructed by the Festiniog Railway Company and the Welsh Highland Railway Limited.

== Present ==
The railway offers a short train ride in heritage carriages to Pen-y-Mount Junction (where there is a physical connection to the current Welsh Highland Railway), just under a mile away from Porthmadog. On the return journey the train stops at Gelerts Farm Halt, the location of the workshops and museum, where visitors can also ride on the Miniature Railway before returning to Porthmadog (WHHR).

The railway is mostly run by volunteers, who operate the trains and maintain the railway and its infrastructure.

In 2014, Russell, the only steam locomotive to survive from the original WHR, returned to service after a major overhaul costing about £250,000. Russell had been out of service since 2003.

== Operations ==
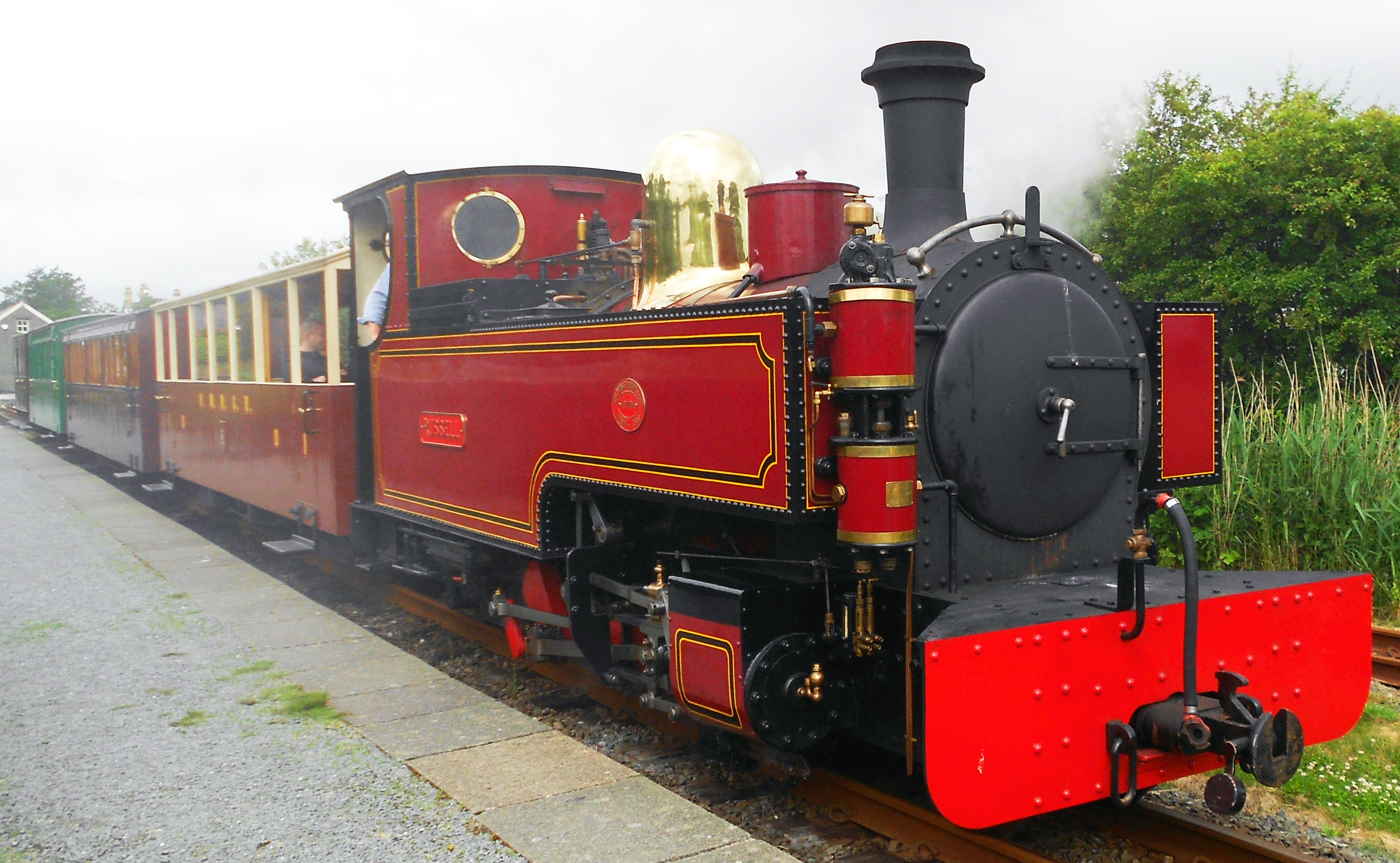
Original WHR locomotive Russell

The railway currently operates trains from March to November from their main station, which is located opposite the Network Rail station in Porthmadog on Tremadog Road. Trains run for 1-mile (1.6 km) to Pen-y-Mount Junction, where the railway connects with the WHR mainline. On the return journey, the train stops at Gelert's Farm halt, allowing passengers to visit the museum and a 7 1/4 in (184 mm) gauge miniature railway.

In 2007 and 2008, an additional short section of line was in use between Pen-y-Mount Junction and Traeth Mawr Loop. This line was built as part of an agreement signed in 1998 with the Ffestiniog Railway and allowed WHR Ltd. to run on the original Welsh Highland Railway trackbed for the first time. As part of the agreement, the section closed and became a construction site when the Ffestiniog Railway-constructed WHR mainline from Caernarvon was connected in 2008.

== Stations ==
- Porthmadog (WHHR)
- Gelerts Farm Works Halt
- Pen-y-Mount Junction railway station
- Traeth Mawr Loop (no passenger access - Temporary 2007–2008)

== See also ==
- British narrow-gauge railways
- South African Class NG 15 2-8-2
