= Caernarfon railway station =

Heritage railway station in Gwynedd, Wales

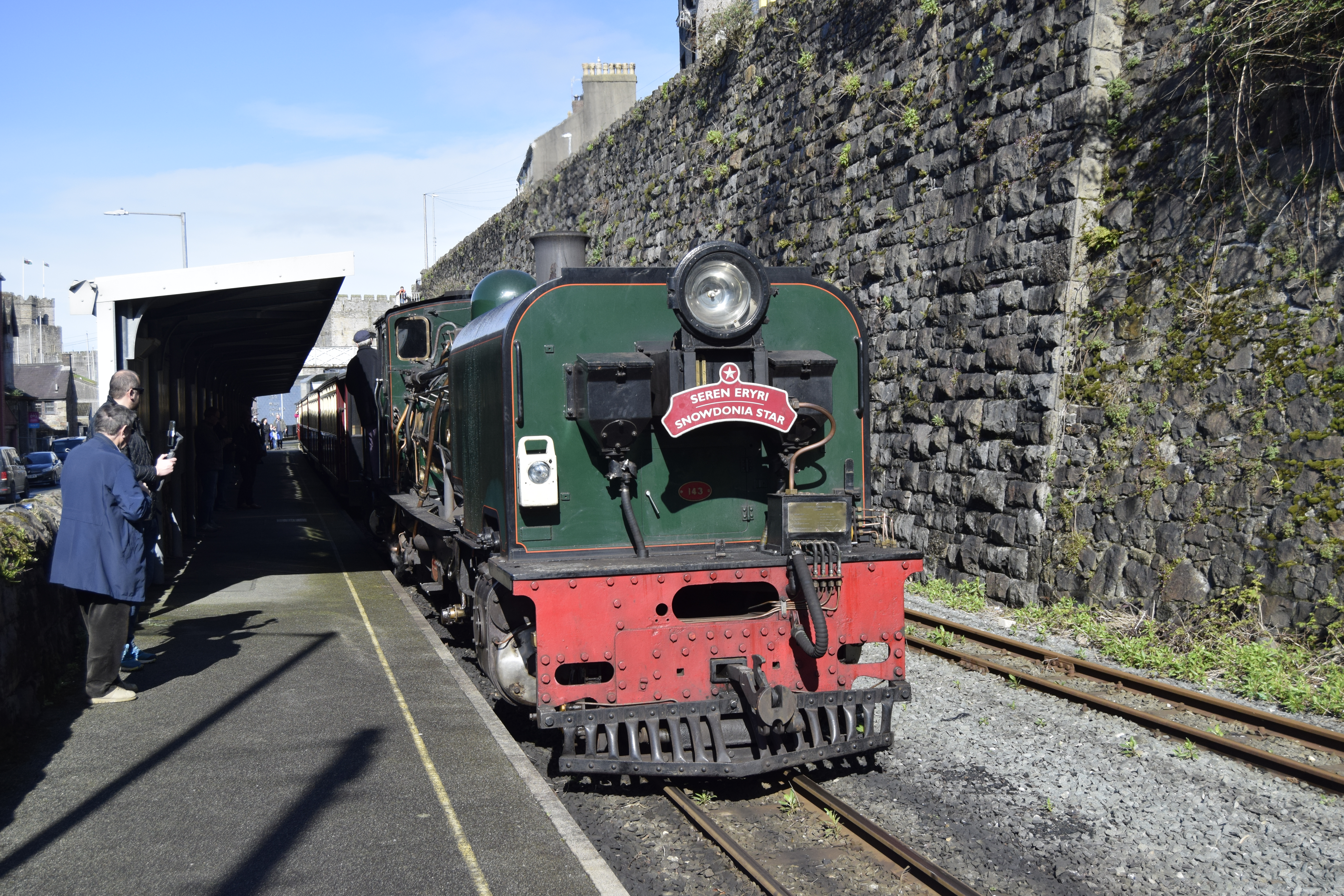

General information
- Location: Caernarfon, Gwynedd; Wales
- Coordinates: 53.1375°N 4.2719°W
- Grid reference: SH480624
- System: Station on heritage railway
- Owner: Ffestiniog and Welsh Highland Railways
- Manager: Ffestiniog and Welsh Highland Railways
- Platforms: 1

Key dates
- 11 October 1997: Opened
Location

Caernarfon railway station is the northern terminus of the narrow gauge Welsh Highland Railway, located in the town of Caernarfon, Gwynedd, Wales. It was opened on 11 October 1997 when the line was constructed from Dinas.

== History ==
The railway between Caernarfon and Dinas was formerly part of the standard gauge Carnarvonshire Railway, later LNWR and LMS, between Caernarfon and Afon Wen. It was closed by British Railways in December 1964 and the tracks were lifted.

Northwards of the present Caernarfon station, the former standard gauge line ran through a tunnel, which is now used by a public road, to the site of the original Caernarvon railway station. The LNWR was under an obligation to build a station on this site (below Segontium Terrace); however, the town corporation waived its claim to this station. The original line continued on to a junction with the Chester and Holyhead Railway just south of the Britannia Bridge, terminating at the now-demolished Menai Bridge station.

== Opening ==
The present station is sited on the former standard gauge trackbed adjacent to St. Helen's Road, opposite the former locomotive works of De Winton & Co and beneath the high retaining walls of Segontium Terrace, which can be reached from St Helen's Road via a pedestrian footbridge. The station buildings accommodate the booking office, a tourist shop and passenger facilities. In the winter of 2005/06, the passenger platform and run around loop at Caernarfon were lengthened to permit the operation of trains up to ten carriages long.

The narrow gauge line was built from Dinas to Caernarfon in 1997, thus providing the extension to Caernarfon of the Welsh Highland Railway that was originally authorised by an act of Parliament, but never built. Between Caernarfon and Dinas, the new Welsh Highland line shares the old standard gauge trackbed with the 'Lôn Eifion' tourist cycle track. This section of line is operated by the Ffestiniog Railway under the provisions of the Caernarfon Railway Light Railway Order 1997 (SI 1997/2534) made 8 October 1997.

A new station to a modern design was built during 2018-19 and was first used for Sion Corn (Santa Claus) trains in December 2018.

Preceding station	Heritage railways	Following station
Terminus	Welsh Highland Railway	Bontnewydd towards Porthmadog Harbour

== Gallery ==
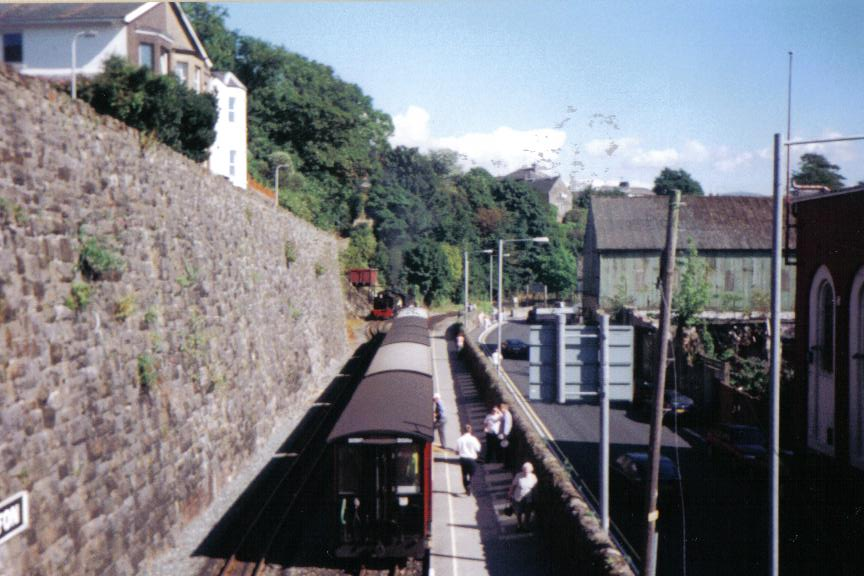
A view of the station from the pedestrian overbridge in August 2005.

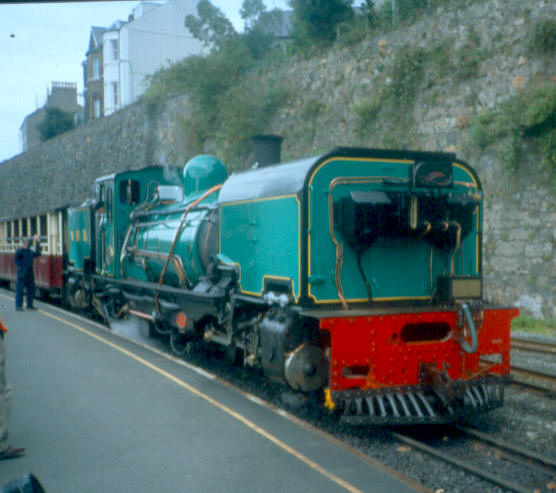
NGG16 No.138 at Caernarfon below the walls of Segontium Terrace.

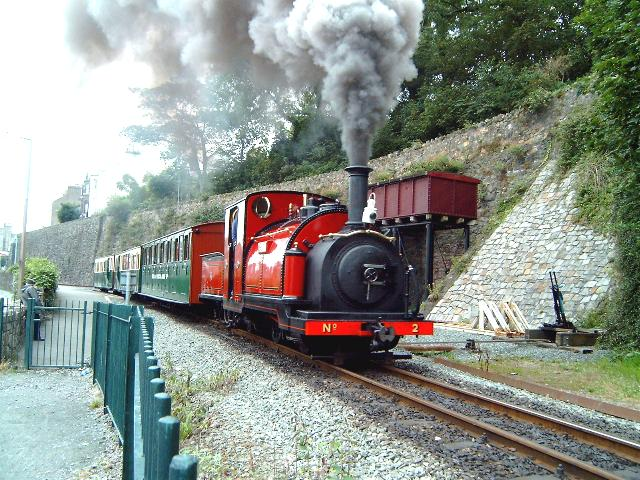
Train hauled by Ffestiniog Railway locomotive Prince departs Caernarfon station, October 2002.

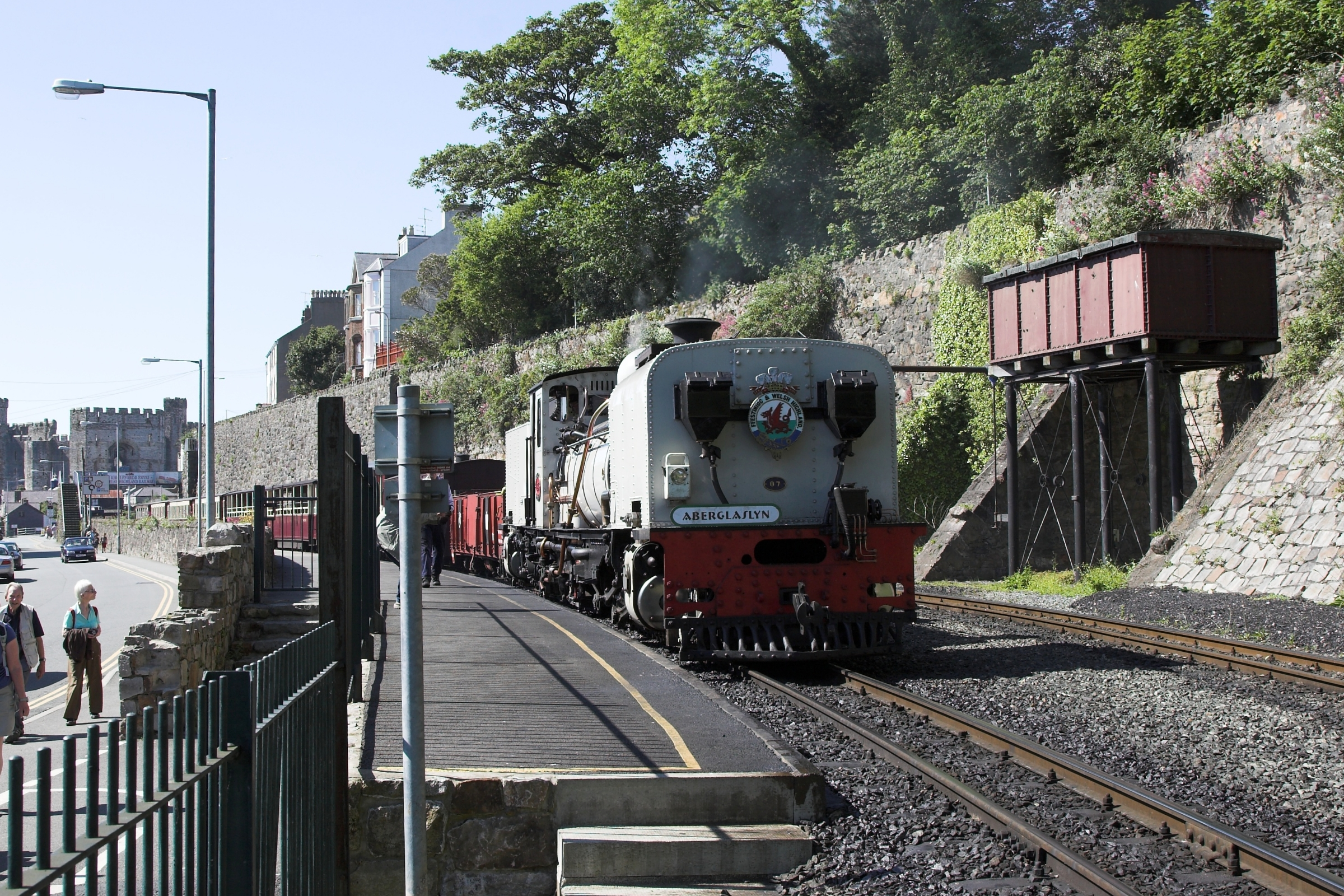
87 at Caernarfon waiting to depart
