= John R. Williams (disambiguation) =

John R. Williams (1782–1854) was an American politician who served as mayor of Detroit.

John R. Williams may also refer to:

- John Ralston Williams (1874–1965), Canadian-American physician
- John Reesor Williams (born 1930), Canadian politician
- John Reginald Williams (born 1955), Australian politician
- John Richard Williams (poet) (1867–1924), Welsh poet
- John Richard Williams (politician) or Jack Williams (1909–1998), American politician and radio announcer who served as Governor of Arizona
- John Richard Williams (priest) (born 1948), Anglican priest
- John Robert Williams (footballer) or Johnny Williams (1947–2021), English footballer

== See also ==
- John Williams (disambiguation)
- John Richard Williams (disambiguation)
