= John Richard Williams =

John Richard Williams may refer to:

- John Richard Williams (poet) (1867–1924), Welsh-language lyrical poet
- John Richard Williams (politician) or Jack Williams (1909–1998), American radio announcer and politician
- John Richard Williams (priest) (born 1948), Anglican priest

== See also ==
- John Williams (disambiguation)
- John R. Williams (disambiguation)
