= Betws Garmon railway station =

Disused railway station in Betws Garmon, Gwynedd

Betws Garmon
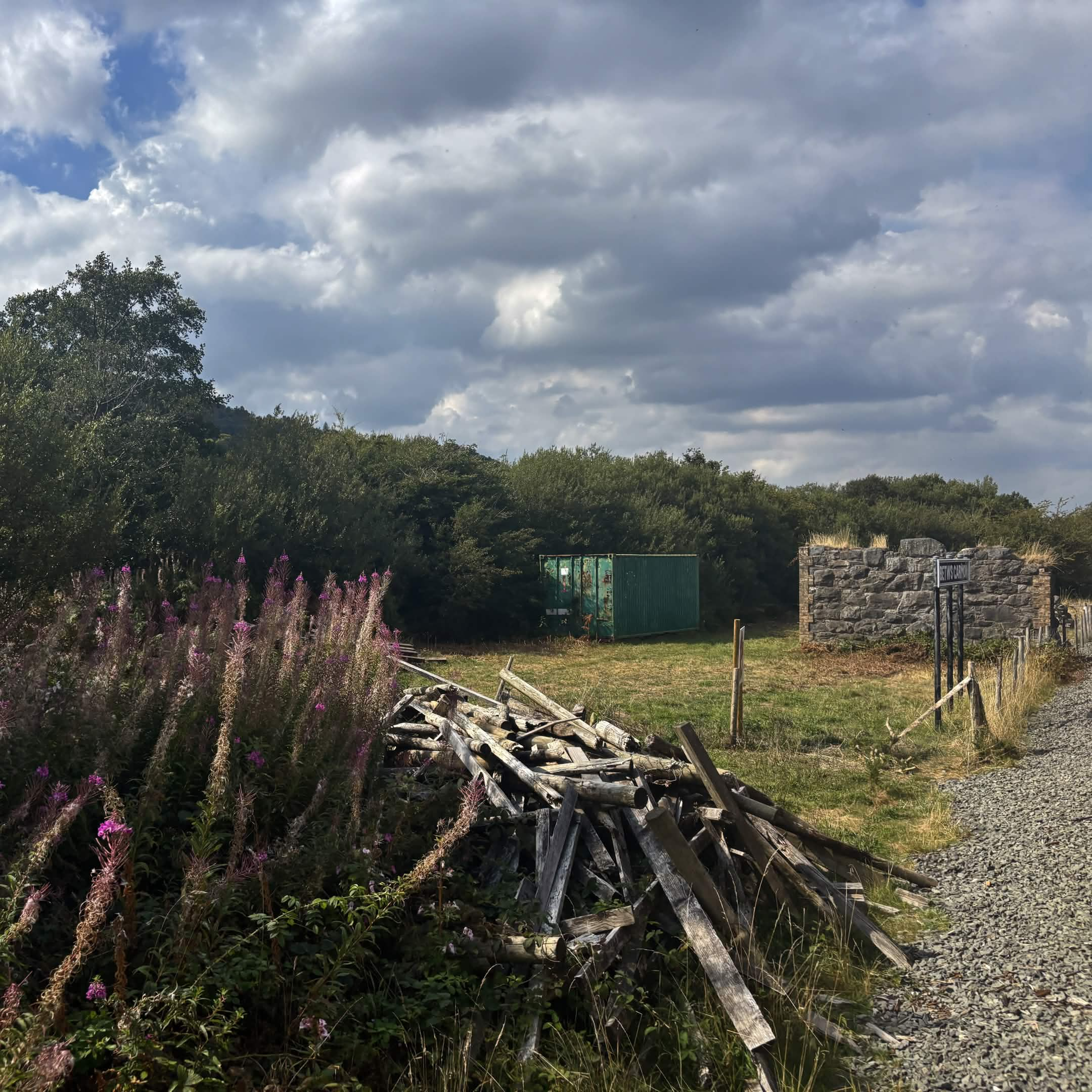
- The station ruins. Note the proximity to the track, preventing restoration.

General information
- Other names: Bettws Garmon
- Location: Betws Garmon, Gwynedd; Wales
- Coordinates: 53°05′49″N 4°11′29″W
- Platforms: 1

Other information
- Status: Disused

History
- Original company: North Wales Narrow Gauge Railways

Key dates
- 1875: Opened
- 28 September 1936: Closed
Location

Betws Garmon, historically spelt Bettws Garmon, was a railway halt serving the village of Betws Garmon, Gwynedd, Wales, from 1875 to 1936 on the Welsh Highland Railway.

== History ==
The station was opened in 1875 by North Wales Narrow Gauge Railways, built in a similar style to its other stations. It closed on 28 September 1936.

A short line curved from behind the station and a branch south west to Ty Coch slate quarries.

Preceding station	Disused railways	Following station
Waunfawr; Line and station closed	Welsh Highland Railway	Plas-y-Nant; Line and station closed
