= Russell (locomotive) =

Welsh narrow gauge 2–6–2T locomotive

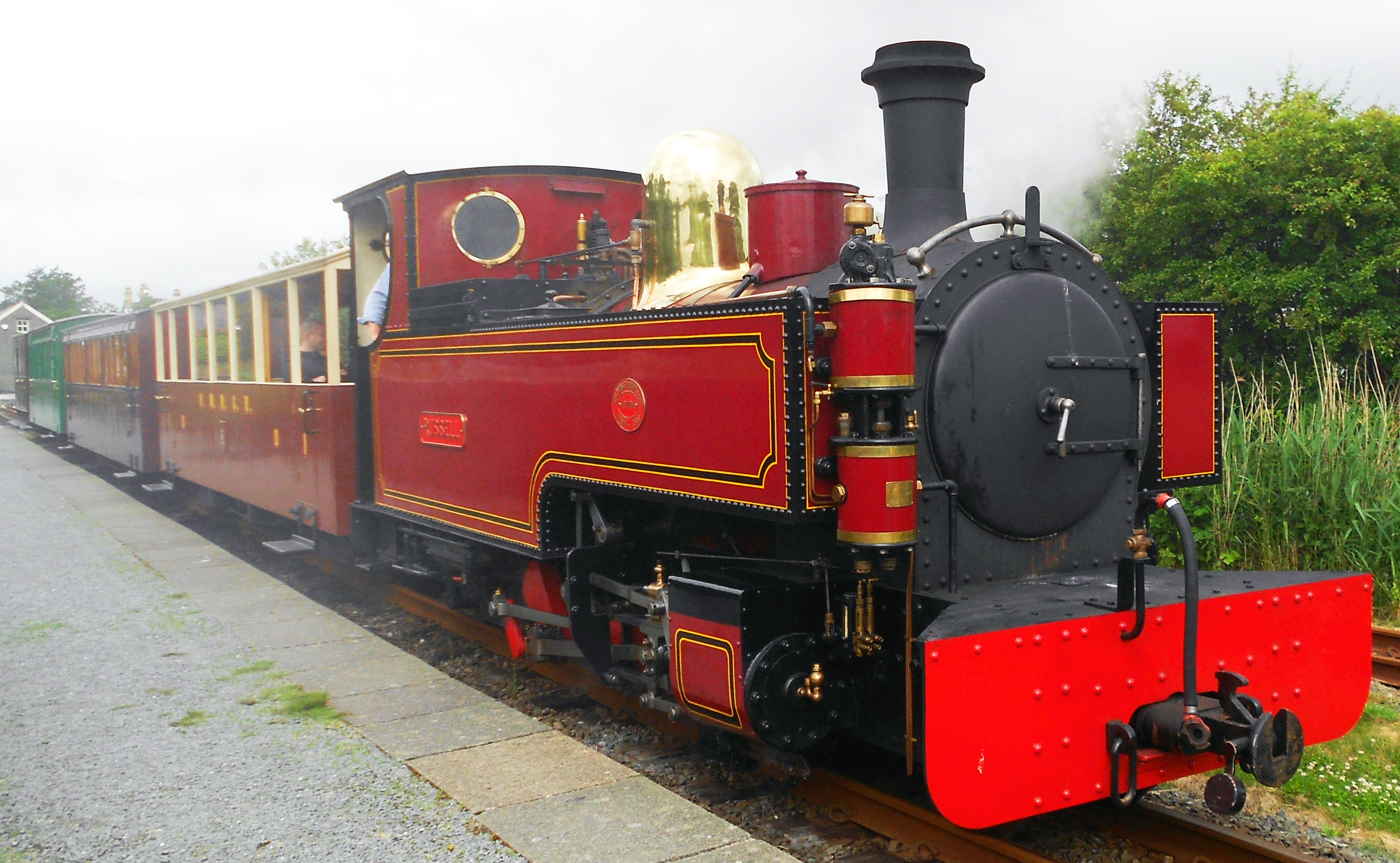
- Russell running on the Welsh Highland Heritage Railway in 2015
Type and origin
- Power type: Steam
- Builder: Hunslet Engine Company
- Serial number: 901
- Build date: 1906
Specifications
- Configuration
  - Whyte: 2-6-2T
  - UIC: 1′C1′ n2t
- Gauge: 1 ft 11 1/2 in (597 mm)
- Driver dia.: 28 in (711 mm)
- Boiler pressure: 160 lbf/in^{2} (1.10 MPa)
- Cylinders: Two, outside
- Cylinder size: 11 in × 15 in (279 mm × 381 mm)
Performance figures
- Tractive effort: 7,425 lbf (33.03 kN)

Russell is a narrow gauge steam locomotive originally built in 1906 for the North Wales Narrow Gauge Railways (NWNGR), but most famously associated with the original Welsh Highland Railway (WHR), and now based at the Welsh Highland Heritage Railway in Porthmadog.

== History ==
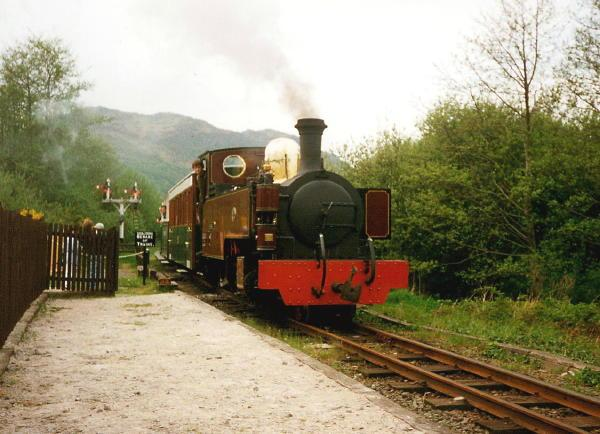
Russell approaching Gelert's Farm halt

- 1906 - Russell was built by the Hunslet Engine Company to the order of the Portmadoc, Beddgelert and South Snowdon Railway (PB&SSR). The PB&SSR was never completed, and sold the locomotive to the North Wales Narrow Gauge Railway (NWNGR), as part of a deal for a two-year delay in electrifying its line by that Company. The locomotive was named after the Chairman, Managing Director and second receiver of that company, J.C.Russell.
- 1922 - The locomotive became the property of the Welsh Highland Railway (WHR), which acquired the NWNGR and the (partially completed) PB&SSR.
- 1924 - After the WHR was taken over by the neighbouring Ffestiniog Railway (FfR), Russell was reduced in height in order to allow it to work trains on the FfR. The Ffestiniog's bridges and tunnels were built to a restrictive loading gauge. The work entailed lowering Russell's chimney, steam dome and cab; however the locomotive was still too wide and could not pass through the long Moelwyn tunnel.
- 1937 - The WHR closed, with Russell running the last through train. The locomotive was left in the sheds at Dinas.
- 1942 - Requisitioned for war service, refurbished by the Brymbo Steel Works, and sent to the Brymbo Ironworks railway in Oxfordshire. It was converted to a 0-6-2T after frequent derailments on the industrial tracks.
- 1946 - Sold to Fayle's Tramway, in the Isle of Purbeck in Dorset.
- 1954 - Russell was purchased by the Birmingham Locomotive Club for £70 in order to secure it for preservation.
- 1955 - It was put on outside display at Tywyn Wharf station on the Talyllyn Railway.
- 1965 - It was donated to the company now known as Welsh Highland Railway Limited through the generosity of the Birmingham Locomotive Club and moved to that company's base at Kinnerley in Shropshire.
- 1970 - Fitted with a new boiler by its makers the Hunslet Engine Company at Leeds and it returned to Kinnerley on 29 January 1971.
- 1971 - Sent to Lakeside Railway Estates Co. Ltd. at Carnforth for further repairs.
- 1974 - Moved from Carnforth to Hills & Bailey Ltd. at Llanberis for further overhaul work. Subsequently the engine was moved to the Gelerts Farm Works of the WHR where the restoration work continued.
- 1987 - Steamed again at the Gelerts Farm Works and has since operated trains regularly on the Welsh Highland Railway (Porthmadog).
- 1988 and 1990 - Visited and operated trains on the Ffestiniog Railway
- 2000 - Visited the Welsh Highland Railway (Caernarfon) and operated trains on the occasion of the official reopening of the line between Dinas and Waunfawr.
- 2005 - Was withdrawn from service pending the commencement of a major overhaul, with the aim of running again between Porthmadog and Dinas, on the completed Welsh Highland Railway.
- 2014 - Russell back in service on WHHR
- 2015 - Russell attends the Talyllyn Railway's 150th anniversary.
- 2018 - Russell completed a test run on the main Welsh Highland Railway, reaching Beddgelert for the first time in over 80 years.

== Design ==
A 2-6-2T steam locomotive, the design of Russell is more closely related to Hunslet No 865 of 1905 otherwise known as Leeds Number 1, although certain engineering aspects can be more readily associated with a design of locomotives supplied to the Sierra Leone Government Railway. One of the driving wheel centres bears the initials SLR, however this has been found to have been a later replacement and not as originally supplied. Originally built with air train brakes, it was converted to vacuum train brakes following the linking of the Welsh Highland and Ffestiniog Railways.

== Fiction ==
A character named "Fearless" Freddie based on this locomotive appeared in the children's television series Thomas & Friends. He is revealed to be a friend of Sir Handel, as well as "the fastest engine in the hills".

== See also ==
- Welsh Highland Heritage Railway
- Restore Russell 2009
- Russell Biography
