= Slate operations on the Welsh Highland Railway =

The original Welsh Highland Railway (WHR) owed its existence to the narrow gauge railways and tramways built to serve commercial slate traffic from slate quarries and other mineral extraction operations along its route.

During the first world war as well as slate other materials such as timber were carried by the North Wales Narrow Gauge Railways, the precursor of the northern half of the Welsh Highland Railway, from the Beddgelert Forest extension. One of the more recent proposals for the re-opened WHR is to again carry timber from the Forestry Commission operation in Beddgelert Forest where the line runs through.

== Tramways and railways serving the slate industry ==
=== Croesor Tramway ===
The Croesor Tramway was built to take slate traffic from the Croesor and New Rhosydd quarries. The Croesor tramway had run from Portmadoc since 1863 up into the Croesor Valley to serve the slate quarries in this area. This was a horse worked line laid to a nominal 2 foot gauge. The section of WHR track which was re-opened in 2009/2010 between Pont Croesor and Porthmadog follows the original trackbed of the tramway.

=== North Wales Narrow Gauge Railways ===
The main line of the North Wales Narrow Gauge Railways was built to serve the following quarries:

- Alexandra Quarry
- Moel Tryfan Quarry
- Braich
- Y Fron
- Cilgwyn

The railway was then extended by a branch from Tryfan Junction to connect with the Hafod-y-Wern quarry branch and Glanrafon where there were sidings.
