= Snowdon Ranger railway station =

Heritige railway station in Wales

Snowdon Ranger
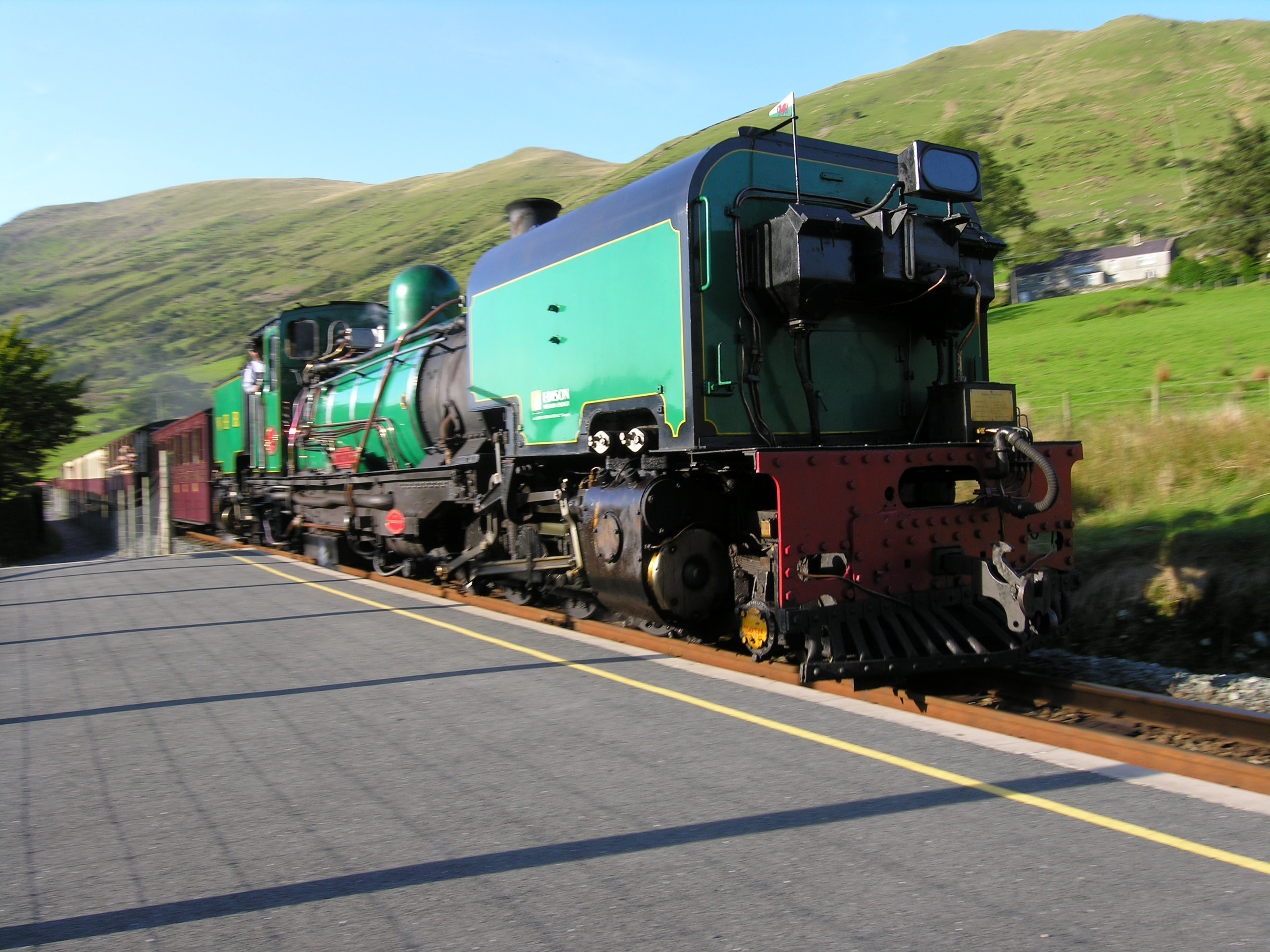
- 138 'Mileniwm'/'Millennium' arriving at Snowdon Ranger station with a southbound service from Caernarfon to Rhyd Ddu

General information
- Location: Gwynedd; Wales
- Coordinates: 53.07375°N 4.143444°W
- Grid reference: SH564551
- System: Station on heritage railway
- Owner: Festiniog Railway Company
- Manager: Welsh Highland Railway
- Platforms: 1

History
- Original company: North Wales Narrow Gauge Railways

Key dates
- 1878: Opened
- 26 September 1936: Closed
- 18 August 2003: Re-opened
Location

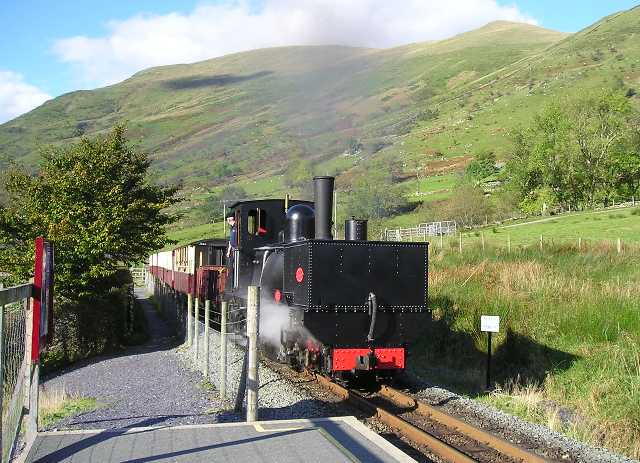
K1, the first Garratt type locomotive, entering Snowdon Ranger station with a passenger train from Caernarfon to Rhyd Ddu on 19 October 2007

Snowdon Ranger is a station on the narrow gauge Welsh Highland Railway, which was built in 1878 as the North Wales Narrow Gauge Railways Moel Tryfan Undertaking, to carry dressed slate to Dinas Junction on the LNWR. The station was originally known as Quellyn Lake but was renamed after the path to the Summit of Snowdon popularised by, and named after, the local mountain guide, "The Snowdon Ranger", who went by that name for many years and was encountered by George Borrow during his 1854 walking trip. Certainly the name "Snowdon Ranger" was in common use on company timetables from as early as 1879, and that of the adjacent Snowdon Ranger Hotel from at least 1869.

Passenger services ceased on 26 September 1936 and the station was reopened in 2003 following the complete reconstruction of the railway from Waunfawr to Rhyd Ddu. The train services are operated by the Festiniog Railway Company's Welsh Highland Railway subsidiary. Snowdon Ranger is currently operated as an unstaffed halt and trains call only by request.

Following reconstruction, the Section from Waunfawr to Rhyd Ddu was formally reopened by the Prince of Wales on 30 July 2003. Prince Charles travelled by special train from Waunfawr to Snowdon Ranger station where, having donned overalls, he alighted from the carriage and travelled on the footplate to Rhyd Ddu. Public passenger services re-commenced on 18 August 2003.

Preceding station	Heritage railways	Following station
Plas-y-Nant towards Caernarfon	Welsh Highland Railway	Rhyd Ddu towards Porthmadog Harbour

The former station building is now in private ownership as a YHA (youth hostel association) hostel and as such is one of the six original remaining NWNGR buildings, the others being the ruins of the former station building at Bettws Garmon, the ruined quarry sidings office at nearby Glanrafon Sidings, the restored station buildings at Tryfan Junction and Dinas; and the goods shed at Dinas.
