= Portmadoc, Beddgelert and South Snowdon Railway =

Defunct narrow-gauge railway in Wales

Coordinates: 52.931°N 4.134°W

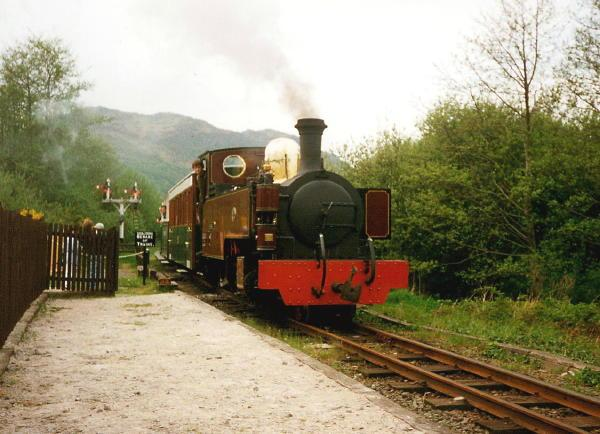
- Russell on the Welsh Highland Heritage Railway

Overview
- Locale: Wales
- Dates of operation: 1901–1910?
- Successor: Welsh Highland Railway

Technical
- Track gauge: 1 ft 11 1/2 in (597 mm)

The Portmadoc, Beddgelert and South Snowdon Railway (PB&SSR) was a 1 ft 11 1/2 in (597 mm) narrow gauge railway intended to connect Porthmadog (then spelled Portmadoc) with the North Wales Narrow Gauge Railways link terminus at Rhyd Ddu. Although some of the line was constructed between 1901 and 1906, it never opened and eventually became part of the Welsh Highland Railway.

== History ==
Portmadoc, Beddgelert and South Snowdon Railway Act 1901
- Act of Parliament
- Parliament of the United Kingdom
- Long title: An Act for the acquisition of the undertaking of the Portmadoc Croesor and Beddgelert Tram Railway Company to construct railways and works in the parishes of Treflys Ynyscynhaiarn and Beddgelert in the county of Carnarvon and the parish of Llanfrothen in the county of Merioneth to produce store and supply electricity for public and private purposes and for other purposes.
- Citation: 1 Edw. 7. c. cclxii

Dates
- Royal assent: 17 August 1901

Text of statute as originally enacted

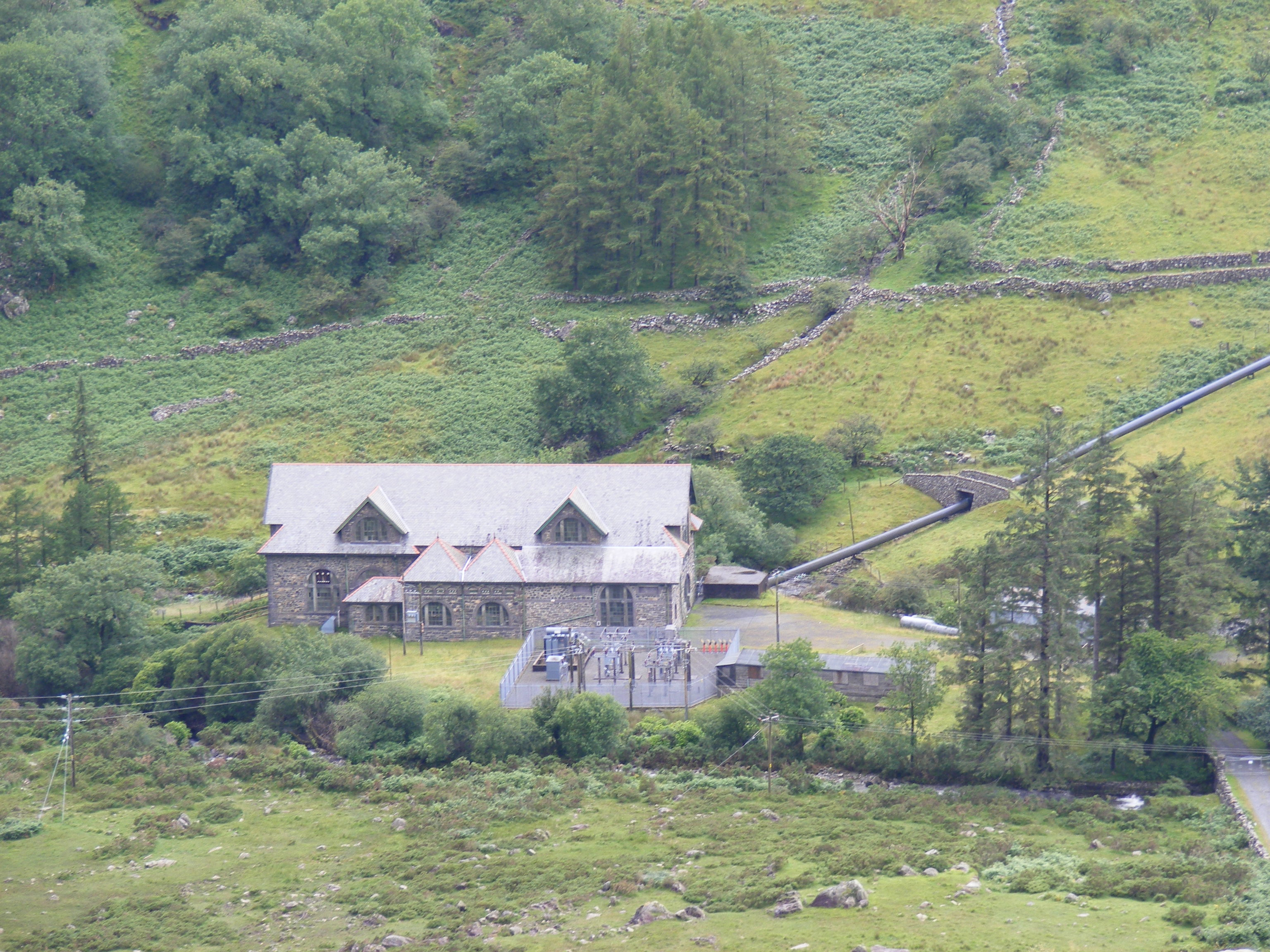
Nant Gwynant power station

There were several attempts by the North Wales Power and Traction Company to promote lines between Portmadoc and Beddgelert with extensions at either end. These culminated in the Portmadoc, Beddgelert and South Snowdon Railway Act 1901 (1 Edw. 7. c. cclxii), authorising a 1 ft 11 1/2 in (597 mm) narrow gauge electric railway to use three phase alternating current at about 630 volts using the system devised by Ganz of Budapest.

=== Proposed route ===
The PB&SSR would have run from the western end of Black Rock sands via Morfa Bychan, Borth y gest, Portmadoc and, using part of the Croesor Tramway, to Beddgelert to link with the South Snowdon Quarries (hence the title) in the Gwynant Valley. There was no intention initially to connect with the North Wales Narrow Gauge system which, at that time, terminated at South Snowdon, a station near the hamlet of Rhyd Ddu.

Portmadoc, Beddgelert and South Snowdon Railway Act 1904
- Act of Parliament
- Parliament of the United Kingdom
- Long title: An Act to empower the Portmadoc Beddgelert and South Snowdon Railway Company to construct new Railways and to authorise Agreements between that Company and the North Wales Narrow Gauge Railways Company and for other purposes.
- Citation: 4 Edw. 7. c. cxciv

Dates
- Royal assent: 15 August 1904

Text of statute as originally enacted

No railway construction was started but, by 1903, a revised scheme was being put forward to link up with the North Wales Narrow Gauge Railways (NWNGR) Beddgelert extension. This resulted in a further revised scheme being approved in the Portmadoc, Beddgelert and South Snowdon Railway Act 1904 (4 Edw. 7. c. cxciv). It appears that there were legal problems with the powers given and, in 1906, these were reapproved with amendments.

=== Construction ===
Work started around 1906 and continued for a couple of years before being abandoned (certainly no work done after 1910). The line from Snowdon (Rhyd Ddu) was virtually complete for well over a mile and was used for a while (mainly during World War I) to extract timber from Beddgelert forest. At the Beddgelert end a roughly laid track for horse-drawn wagons was also used for timber.

The original intention to run to Black Rock had been forgotten and no mention was made of the line to South Snowdon quarries. However, in 1908, they did promote a further line up the Gwynant Valley and on to Betws-y-Coed. No work was done on this line.

=== Abandonment ===
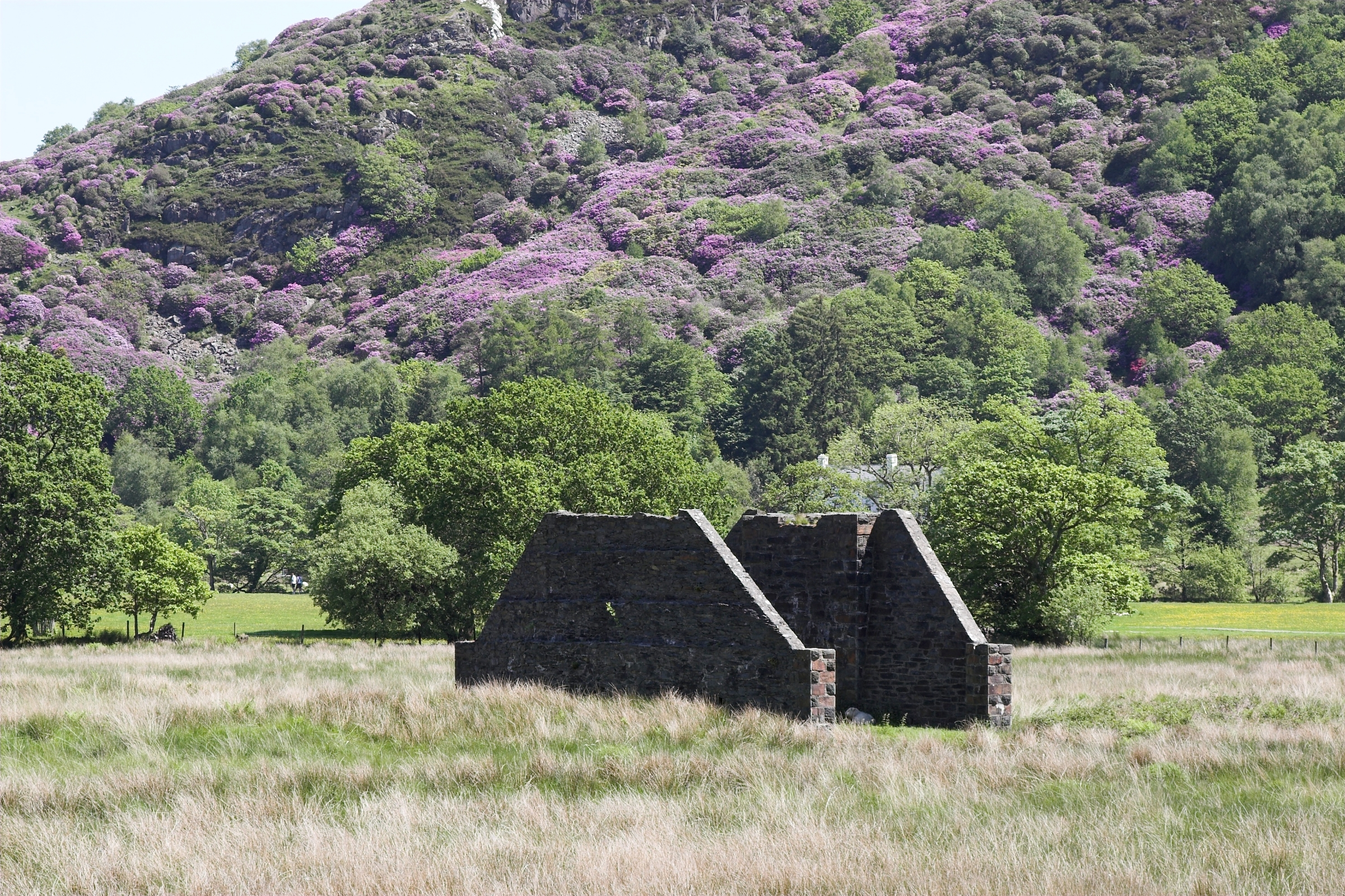
Bridge abutments between Beddgelert and the Aberglaslyn pass

The North Wales Power and Traction Co Ltd, the sole PB&SSR backer, overspent on the construction of the power station. It started generating electricity in September 1906, but meanwhile, completion of the railway and electrifying the North Wales Narrow Gauge Railways (NWNGR) took a back seat, and in January 1906 J. C. Russell, chairman and managing director of the NWNGR, insisted on terms for a two-year delay which included expenditure on "restoring the NWNGR for present steam working and providing one steam locomotive for a sum not exceeding £2,500". This resulted in the arrival of Russell as NWNGR property. In the event this delay led to an abandonment.

Sections of abandoned cuttings and embankments of the original route still survive in the Beddgelert area. These include an abandoned embankment, a completed bridge over the A498 at the southern end of Beddgelert village near the Royal Goat Hotel and nearby bridge abutments in a field. The abutments of the Afon Glaslyn bridge were also constructed and that of the west bank is now a Welsh Water Authority measuring station.

=== Welsh Highland Railway ===
The PB&SSR and North Wales Narrow Gauge Railways were later amalgamated and became the Welsh Highland Railway. Some work undertaken for the PB&SSR was used for the Welsh Highland Railway.

== Motive power ==
Ten electric locomotives were ordered from Bruce Peebles & Co. Ltd. of Edinburgh who held a licence from Ganz. At least six were built, although none were delivered. All six were scrapped during the First World War. The electrification project was abandoned about 1906 and a steam locomotive "Russell" was ordered from the Hunslet Engine Company of Leeds.

It was intended to electrify all the North Wales Narrow Gauge Railways once the two lines were connected. In 1914, local councils got together to try to get the building restarted but failed due to the start of World War I. Another attempt was made after the war which resulted in the building of the Welsh Highland Railway following most of the same route but with changes made near Beddgelert to ease the gradients to allow the use of steam locos.

The electricity was to be produced at a hydro electric power station further up the Gwynant Valley and surplus power was to be available for local domestic and industrial use. This part of the scheme was actually built and the power station still operates.

== See also ==
- British narrow gauge railways
