= Rhostryfan railway station =

Former railway station in Gwynedd, Wales

Rhostryfan
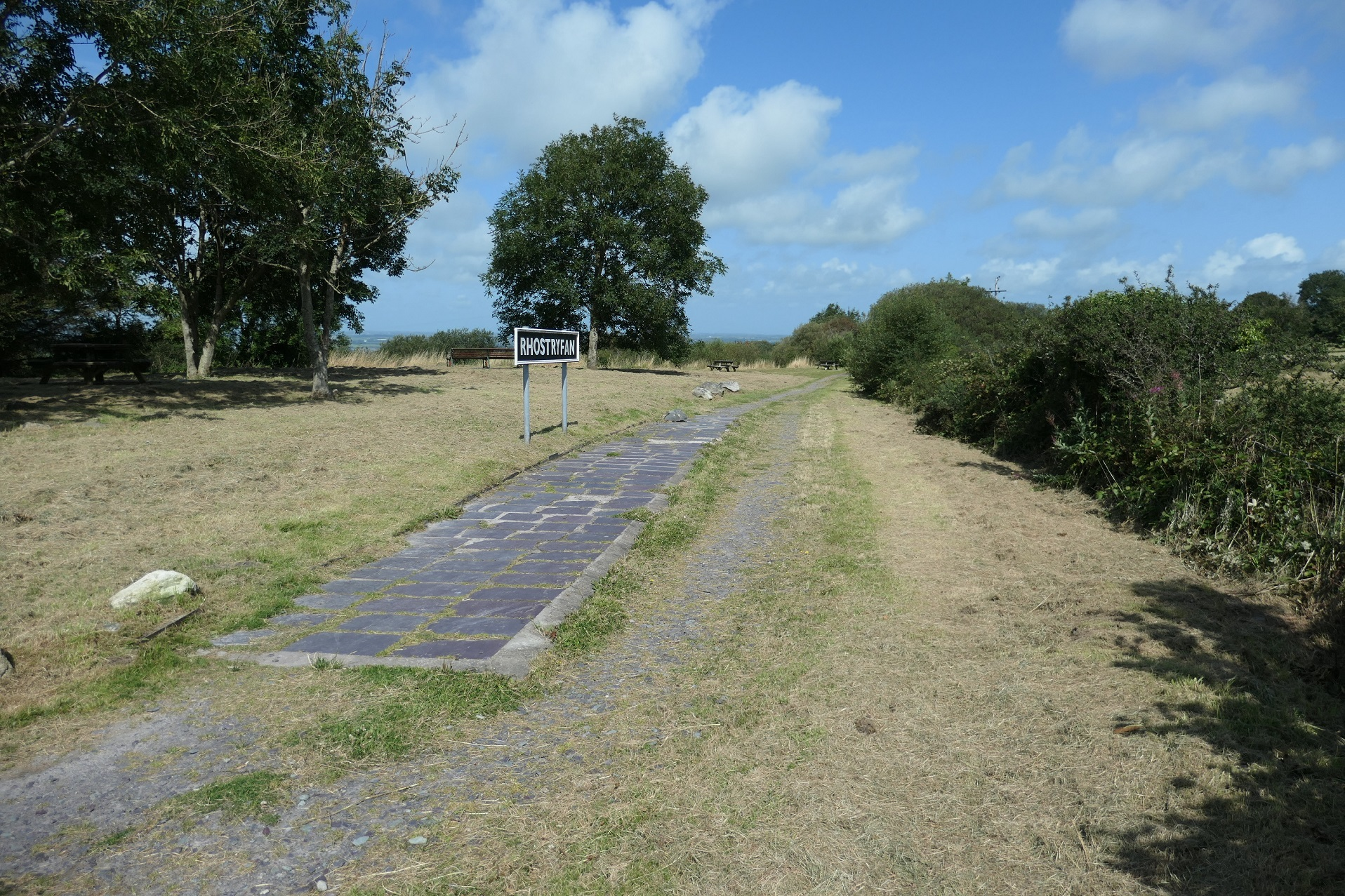
- The former platform in 2019

General information
- Location: Rhostryfan railway station, Rhostryfan, Gwynedd; Wales
- Coordinates: 53.09781°N 4.24472°W
- Platforms: 1

Other information
- Status: Disused

Key dates
- 15 August 1877: Opened
- 1 January 1914: Closed to passenger trains
- 26 Sept 1936: Closed completely
Location

Rhostryfan railway station was the intermediate station on the Bryngwyn Branch of the North Wales Narrow Gauge Railways (NWNGR) and its successor the Welsh Highland Railway (WHR). At some time since closure, the station itself has been demolished.

Although the line from Tryfan Junction to Bryngwyn has been purchased by the Festiniog Railway Company, there are no immediate plans to reopen the line. In 2011 the trackbed of the line became a public footpath, although with the condition that this would not impede any reopening of the branch line in the future.

== See also ==
- North Wales Narrow Gauge Railways

Preceding station	Disused railways	Following station
Bryngwyn	Welsh Highland Railway	Tryfan Junction
