= Victoria Working Men's Club =

Working men's club

Victoria Working Men's Club, Kew
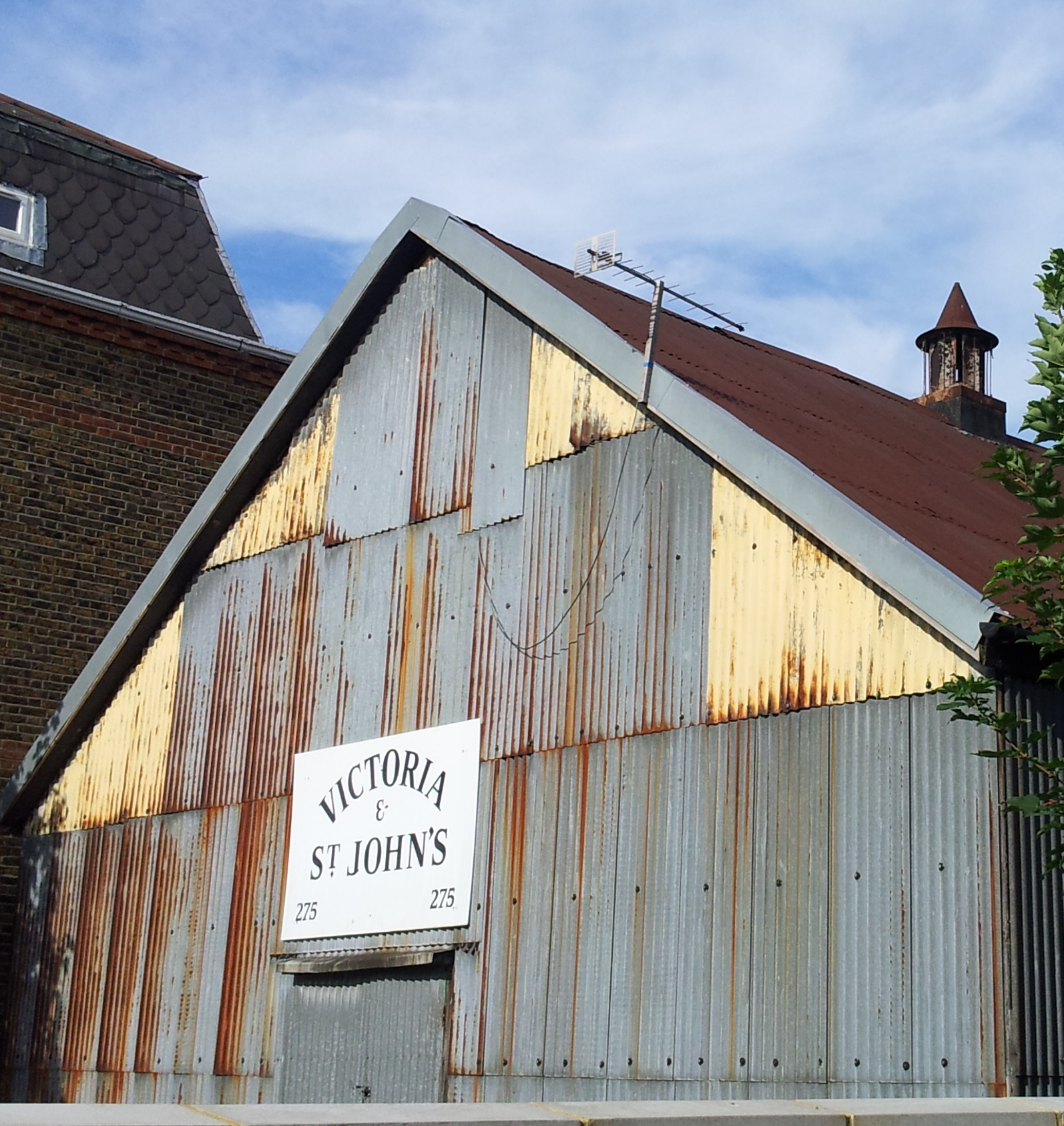
- Exterior view of Victoria Working Men's Club, Kew
- Interactive map of the Victoria Working Men's Club, Kew area

General information
- Architectural style: Tin tabernacle
- Location: Kew, London Borough of Richmond upon Thames, England
- Completed: 1889

Technical details
- Structural system: Corrugated iron

The Victoria Working Men's Club was a working men's club at 275 Sandycombe Road in Kew, Richmond, London which operated from 1892 until 2015, when the building it occupied was sold to a property developer. In February 2017 Richmond upon Thames Council approved a planning application to demolish the building, and erect a new community building and six flats.

== The building ==
The club was housed in Victoria & St John's, a building in timber clad with corrugated iron, which from 1876 to 1889 had been an iron church on the opposite side of Sandycombe Road, housing St Luke's Church and St Luke's School. It was moved to its present position in 1889 when the current St Luke's Church was built in The Avenue. Its close association with the history of Kew led to it being listed in 2005 by the local council as a Building of Townscape Merit.

== The club ==
Alderman James Weeks Szlumper, an engineer and major benefactor of Darell Road School, who had also been mayor of Richmond, was, for many years, the club's president and patron.

The club was renowned for the amount of money it raised to send cigarettes to British soldiers at the front in the First World War. It was visited by four overseas prime ministers and many British government ministers and by members of the British royal family. A photograph shows Alderman Szlumper seated between the Duke and Duchess of York (later King George VI and Queen Elizabeth). David Blomfield, former chairman of the Richmond Local History Society, said: "In all, the club boasted of visits from 50 such VIPs over seven years – probably a unique record for a club of its size, and most certainly for one set in such accommodation".

== Current use ==
The building continued to be used by the club as a billiards hall until 2015; it is now empty. As of 2016, an extension at the back of the building was still used by a school for Japanese martial arts.

In February 2017 Richmond upon Thames Council approved a planning application to demolish the building, and erect a new community building and six flats.
