= St Luke's Church, Kew =

Coordinates: 51.4739°N 0.2891°W

- Kew St. Luke
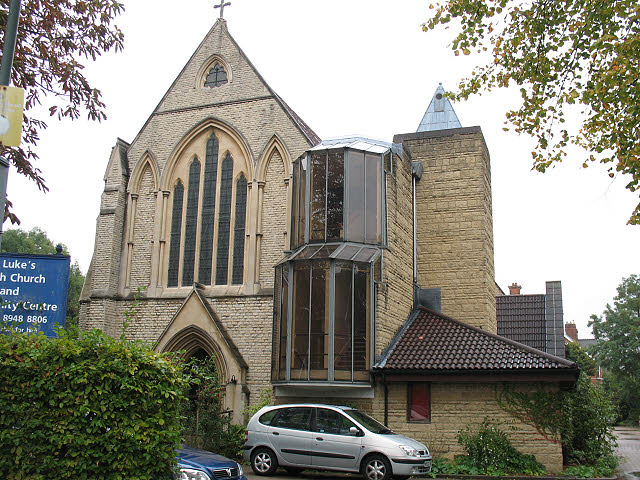
- St Luke's Church, Kew
- St Luke's Church, Kew
- Location: St Luke’s Church, The Avenue, Kew, Richmond TW9 2AJ
- Country: England
- Denomination: Church of England
- Website: www.stlukeskew.org

History
- Founded: 1889

Architecture
- Architect: Goldie, Child and Goldie
- Style: Gothic Revival
- Years built: 1889; redesigned 1983

Administration
- Diocese: Southwark
- Archdeaconry: Wandsworth
- Deanery: Richmond & Barnes
- Parish: Kew, St Luke

Clergy
- Bishop: Christopher Chessun
- Vicar: Rev Dr Melanie Harrington

St Luke's Church, Kew, is a parish church in Kew, in the London Borough of Richmond upon Thames. It is part of the Church of England and the Anglican Communion and, locally, is a member of Churches Together in Kew. Together with St Philip and All Saints (the Barn Church), it is one of two parishes within the united benefice of Kew, St Philip & All Saints with St Luke. Its vicar, Rev Dr Melanie Harrington, took up the role in June 2021. The church, built in the Gothic Revival style by architects Goldie, Child and Goldie, is also host to the Kew Community Trust and acts as a community centre.

== Communications ==
The parish publishes a magazine, The Link.

== History ==
Kew's population increased considerably when the District line was extended to Richmond and a railway station was opened at Kew Gardens. To meet the needs of the extended parish, a temporary "iron church" (later Victoria & St John's Working Men's Club) was opened in Sandycombe Road. St Luke's Church, in The Avenue, was built to replace it, in 1889.

The large Victorian church could seat a congregation of 400, built in irregularly coursed sandstone with a large towerless nave and a chancel of equal height. The initial design also included a spire that was never built. The population of Kew was increasing at this time, brought about partly by the extension of the London and South Western Railway to Kew and Richmond, and St Luke's was built in anticipation of a growing population and growing congregation, although it is doubtful whether it ever regularly enjoyed full congregations. By the 1970s, the congregation had dwindled (sometimes to just as few as 12), and there were frequent complaints of the church being uncomfortable and cold. In the late 1970s, ambitious plans to turn the church in to a secular day centre for the elderly, with a much-reduced area for worship were drawn up, £600,000 was budgeted for the conversion, and the church hall was sold for £50,000 with the proceeds going towards the cost of the work. The work was carried out in two phases, phase 1 from 1984-1985, and phase two in 1989. The upstairs room, which opened in 1990, was opened by HRH Princes Alexandra, after whom it was named. The works reduced the church area to just the former chancel and aisles, with the rest of the building given to secular uses, occupied by the Kew Community Trust, which leases the premises from the parochial church council. This portion of the building is known as 'The Avenue Halls', and can be hired for adult or children's parties, weddings and other celebrations.

A rebuilt and restored Walker pipe organ (1880) was installed in 1999, originally built for the Brentford Free Church. The church originally had an organ by Henry Willis from 1897.

Former Liberal Party chairman Timothy Beaumont, Baron Beaumont of Whitley, was priest in charge from 1986 to 1991.

== Other uses ==
The community spaces in the building are currently occupied by the Kew Community Trust. The core activity of the Trust is the Avenue Club, a non-profit making social centre offering a range of recreational activities for the whole community.

== Gallery ==
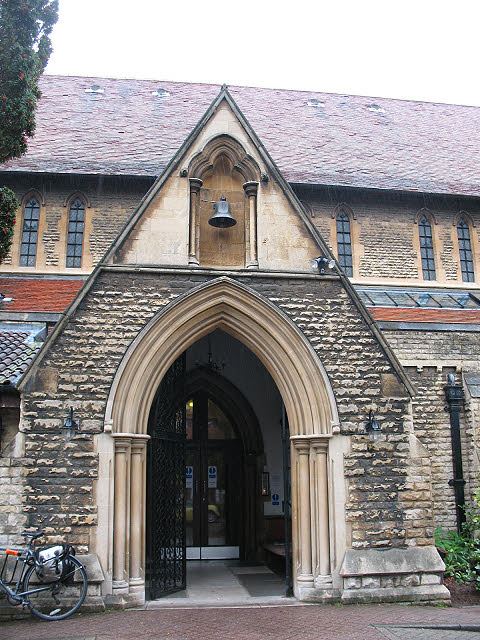
South porch

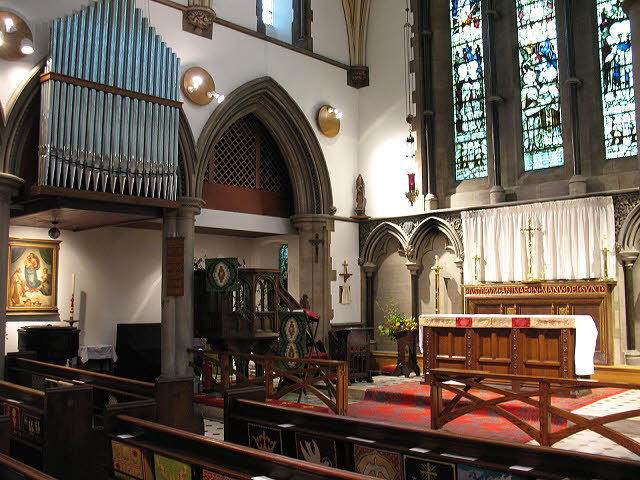
The chancel

== See also ==
- The Barn Church, Kew
- St Anne's Church, Kew
- Victoria Working Men's Club
