= James Szlumper =

English civil engineer

Sir James Szlumper
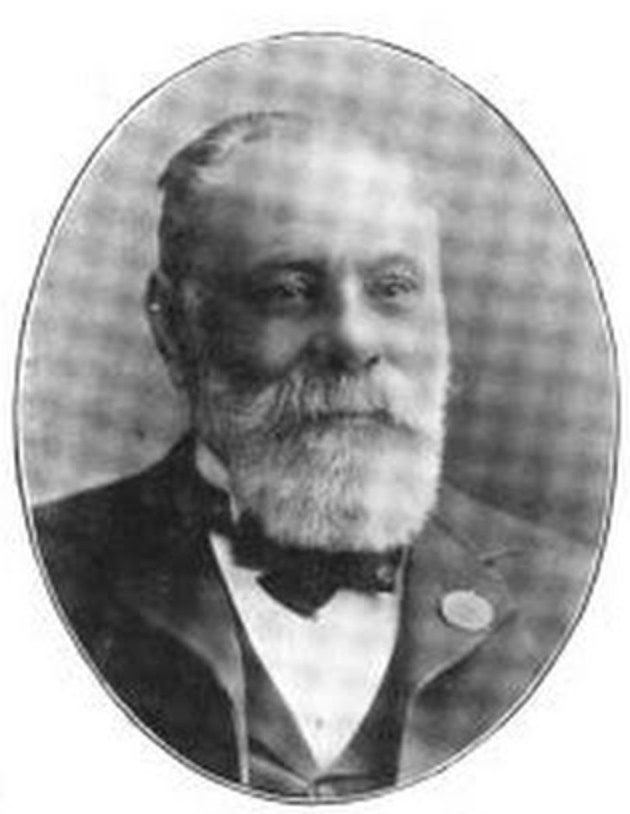
- Portrait of James Weeks Szlumper, taken around 1909
- Born: James Weeks Szlumper; 29 January 1834; Westminster, London, England
- Died: 27 October 1926
- Occupations: Civil engineer, Railway engineer

Sir James Weeks Szlumper JP DL (29 January 1834 – 27 October 1926) was an English civil engineer. He was Chief Engineer on a number of key railway engineering projects in the Victorian era.

== Biography ==
Szlumper was born in Westminster to Albert Szlumper, a Polish tailor, and his first wife, Eliza. He began his career with a London firm of engineers, and in 1853 was appointed surveyor to the county of Cardiganshire, a position in which he held for 25 years. In this position, he was often in correspondence and conflict with the local landowners, particularly John Waddingham, the then owner of the Hafod Estate. His younger half-brother Alfred Weeks Szlumper (1858–1934) was also a railway engineer.

=== Railway engineer ===
Szlumper had a dual career as a railway engineer, laying out some of key lines linking the major routes to the wider countryside of Wales and the West.

He started his railway career engineering parts of the London Underground in employment in London. When he took the job of Surveyor to the county of Cardiganshire, he also held the role of deputy engineer of the Manchester and Milford Railway, which never reached either of the locations in its title, being restricted to a line between Strata Florida and Pencader, Carmarthenshire. However, he became good friends with the line's manager James Cholmeley Russell, and resultantly later became civil engineer to the North Wales Narrow Gauge Railways and in 1906 became a director. Russell and Szlumper were two of the proposers of the Vale of Rheidol Light Railway from Aberystwyth to Devil's Bridge (originally proposed by the Manchester & Milford Railway), although Russell resigned from the VofR project in its infancy in 1899.

Szlumper later worked on projects in the Montgomeryshire; the South Wales Valleys including the Barry Railway, the Pethick and Vale of Glamorgan Railway and the Pontypridd Caerphilly and Newport Railway; and Devon including the Plymouth, Devonport and South-Western Junction Railway, and the Lynton and Barnstaple Railway.

==== West Wales railways ====
On 31 December 1868, Szlumper was appointed Chief Engineer of the Whitland & Taf Vale Railway (W&TVR), having been recommended by business partner and Member of Parliament David Davies. The W&TVR was closely aligned to the Pembroke and Tenby Railway (P&TR), having a virtually common set of investors and board of directors. The P&TR also had close links to the Manchester and Milford Railway (M&MR), which ran over the Szlumper engineered metals of the Carmarthen and Cardigan Railway (C&CR) to connect to Carmarthen station

The W&TVR was driven by John Owen, the proprietor of some slate quarries near Glogue, and Szlumper agreed to see the construction of the railway for £50 per mile and £15 per mile for out of pocket expenses, and to deal with the preparation of all plans and sections for the necessary Parliamentary Bill. By 1868, Szlumper was engineer to the C&CR, M&MR, P&TR and the W&TVR.

After an accident with a through LNWR train to Tenby, Szlumper rebuilt the stations at Tenby and Pembroke, and extended the P&TR further into Pembroke Dock, to allow larger trains to access the line from 3 August 1870. The M&MR promoted the benefits of the P&TR to access Pembroke Dock to its customers in the Midlands, but the relationship only prospered for three years after the P&TR ceased working east of Whitland station over the Great Western metals, from 31 July 1872.

The board of the P&TR realised they needed to gain economies of scale, and so appointed the largest M&MR shareholder J.J.Barrow to their board on 31 August 1871. Barrow needed the stable income and docks of the P&TR as his own M&MR was suffering financially through lack of traffic from the Midlands to Wales. Barrow appointed A.C.Sheriff to the board of the P&TR in May 1872, the former Traffic Manager of the Oxford, Worcester and Wolverhampton Railway. Further developments had to wait until the formation of the P&TR and M&MR Joint Committee in 1879; but by this point the M&MR was totally insolvent and the GWR had developed its strength in West Wales.

On 24 March 1873 the W&TR opened to Glogue, and by October 1874 to Crymmych Arms. During the period 1859 to 1876, the P&TR had seen three different chairmen, two secretaries and three engineers. Due to the insolvency of the M&MR, in June 1879 the board joint board of company to investigate the costs of the railway. Szlumper was paid a salary of £150 per annum by the M&MR, and £80 for the P&TR. The board felt Szlumper had not fulfilled his duties properly, particularly after incorrectly engineering the M&MR junction at Pencader which was investigated by the Railway Inspectorate. He was replaced by Lionel R. Woods, formerly of the North Eastern Railway, in December 1879.

The W&TVR extension to Cardigan was completed on 31 August 1886, after the GWR had taken over the joint companies in 1881.

=== Public life ===
Szlumper was elected as a Liberal member of Cardiganshire County Council at a by-election in 1892 but did not seek re-election in 1895. Having served as a Justice of the Peace, in 1898 Szlumper became High Sheriff of Cardiganshire.

=== Personal life ===
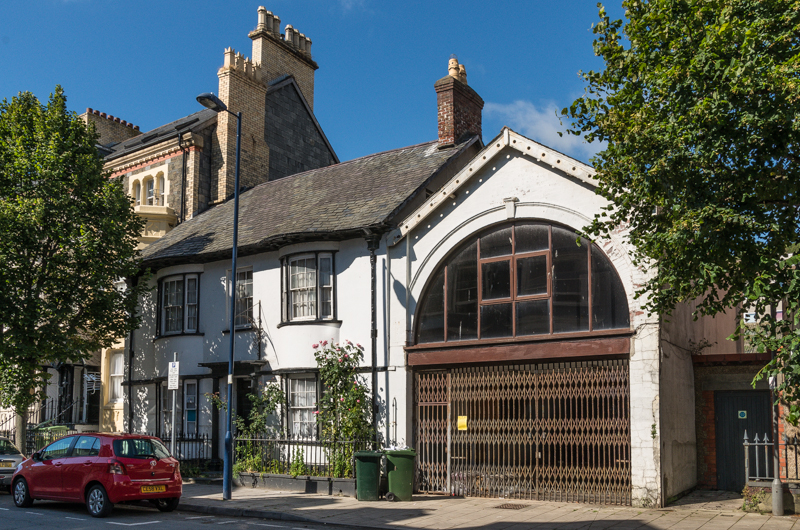
Sandmarsh Cottage, Aberystwyth

Szlumper married Mary Culliford in 1867 and had one son and two daughters. The family lived at Sandmarsh, Aberystwyth. After Szlumper's retirement from the role of surveyor of Cardiganshire, the family moved to Holmesdale Road in Richmond, Surrey, where he became Mayor twice. He was also a major benefactor of Darell Road School in Kew and was, for many years, president and patron of the Victoria Working Men's Club in Kew.

A Master Freemason of the Jubilee Masters Lodge, No. 2712, and also a Past Master of Aberystwyth Lodge, No. 1072, his long-term friends included Mary of Teck, the Queen Consort of George V.

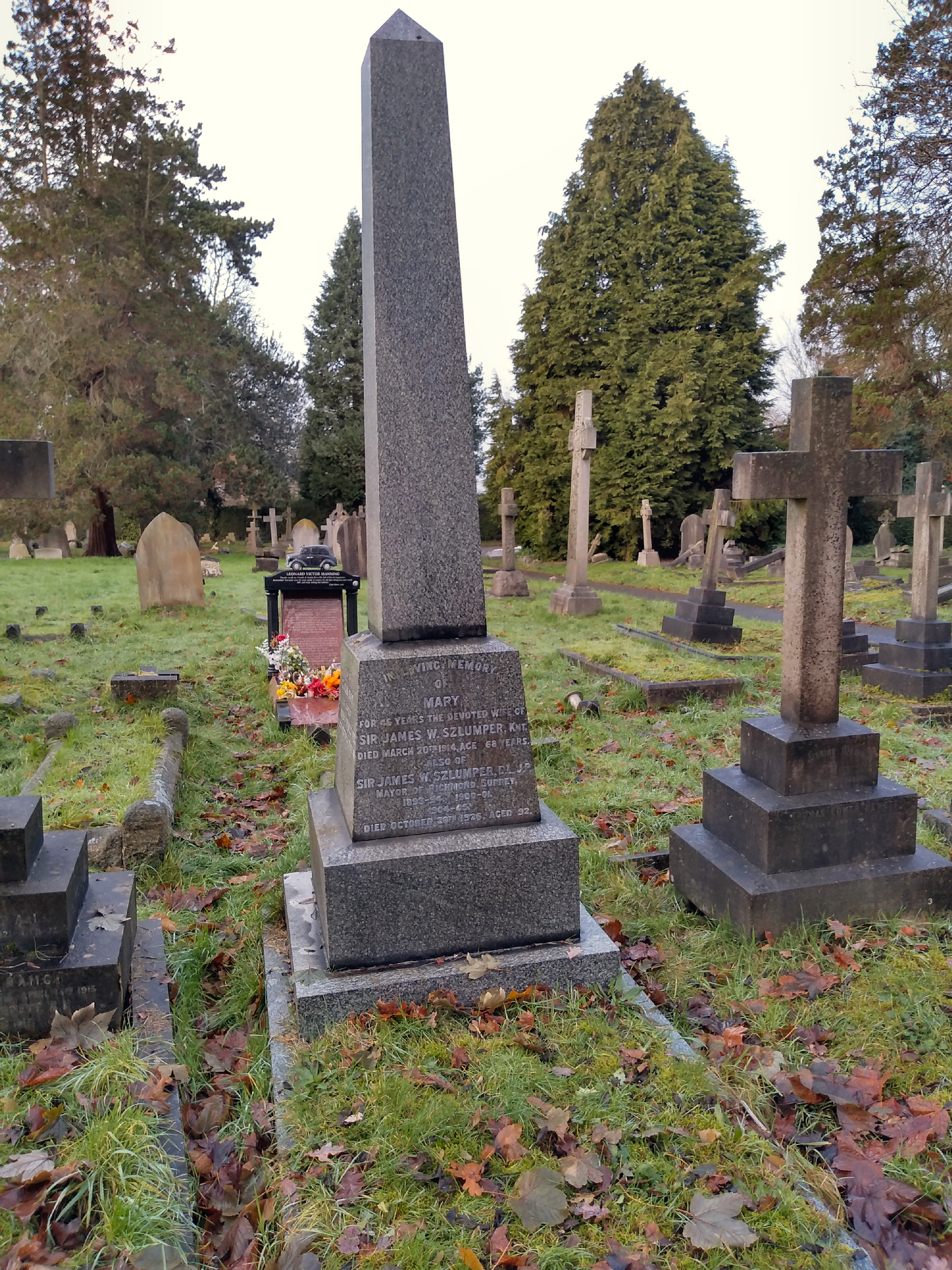
Richmond Cemetery

Szlumper died on 27 October 1926 and is buried in Richmond Cemetery (Section O, grave number 2414).

== Projects engineered ==
- Barry Railway, 1884–1885
- Carmarthen and Cardigan Railway
- London Underground
- Lynmouth and Minehead Light Railway, 1896–1898
- Lynton and Barnstaple Railway
- Manchester and Milford Railway
- Pembroke and Tenby Railway
- Pethick and Vale of Glamorgan Railway, 1889–1901
- Plymouth, Devonport and South Western Junction Railway
- Pontypridd Caerphilly and Newport Railway
- North Wales Narrow Gauge Railways
- Vale of Glamorgan Railway, 1894
- Vale of Rheidol Light Railway
- Whitland & Taf Vale Railway

As Szlumper helped plan various lines running from or attaching to/joining with the South Wales Railway, he left in his collection of papers complete Ordnance Survey maps from 1896, in continuous length, showing the proposed routes of the railways from London to Swansea and its connections, and the proposed railway from London to Cardiff and its connections
