= Plas-y-Nant railway station =

Railway halt on the Welsh Highland Railway, Wales

Coordinates: 53°4′58.5″N 4°10′11.3″W

Plas-y-nant
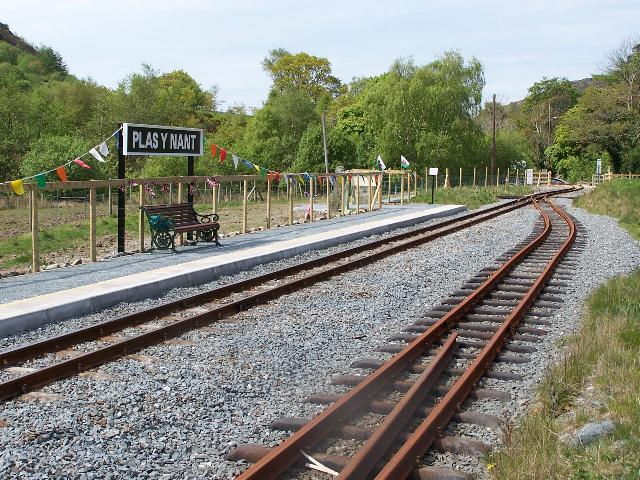

General information
- Location: Plas-y-nant, Gwynedd; Wales
- Grid reference: SH547561
- System: Station on heritage railway
- Owner: Festiniog Railway Company
- Manager: Welsh Highland Railway
- Platforms: 1

History
- Original company: North Wales Narrow Gauge Railways
Location

Plas-y-Nant is an unstaffed halt on the narrow gauge Welsh Highland Railway.

== History ==
A halt at Plas-y-Nant was first used in the 1920s but closed with the line in 1936. This new halt near the northern end of Llyn Cwellyn was opened on 15 May 2005. The train services are operated by the Festiniog Railway Company's Welsh Highland Railway subsidiary and trains call only by request.

Despite some initial hostility to the railway and local objections to a halt, former visitors to the outdoor centre Plas-y-Nant raised and funded the entire amount to pay for its construction and turned out in force with members of the local community on the opening day for a train ride to Rhyd Ddu and back.

== Facilities ==
During rebuilding from Waunfawr to Rhyd Ddu (between 2001 and 2003), consideration was given to establishing a temporary terminus at Plas-y-nant during the spring of 2003. Although the 2003 timetable was published with this option, the loop was never completed. An engineer's siding was provided but was later removed.

At present, the halt only has a platform but there are plans for a waiting shelter.

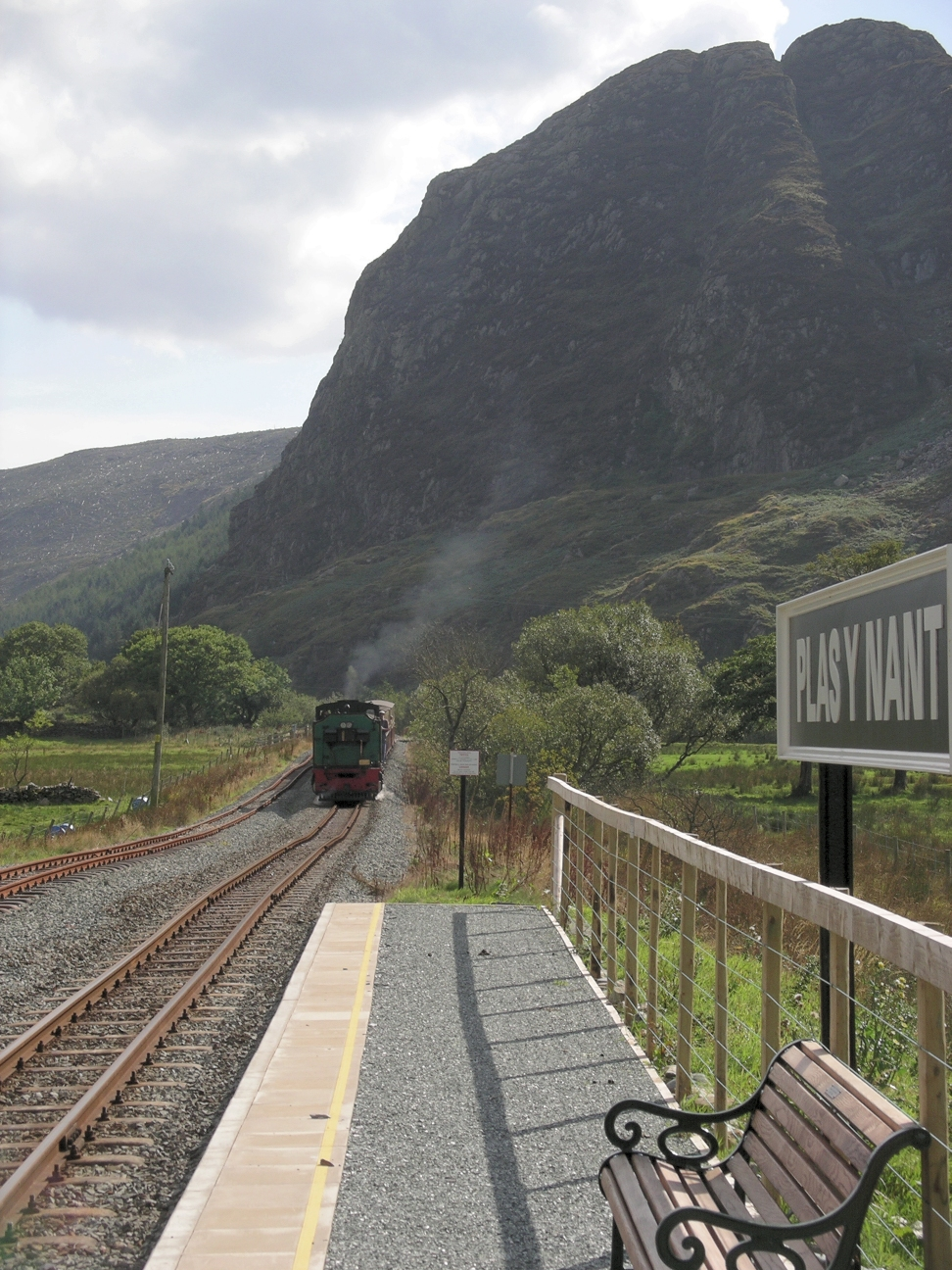
Mileniwm hauling a train towards Plas y Nant station, September 2005

Preceding station	Heritage railways	Following station
Waunfawr towards Caernarfon	Welsh Highland Railway	Snowdon Ranger towards Porthmadog Harbour
