= Rhyd Ddu railway station =

Heritage railway station in Wales

Rhyd Ddu _{^{(1881-late 1880s; 1934-present)}} Snowdon (late 1880s-?) South Snowdon(1893-1934)
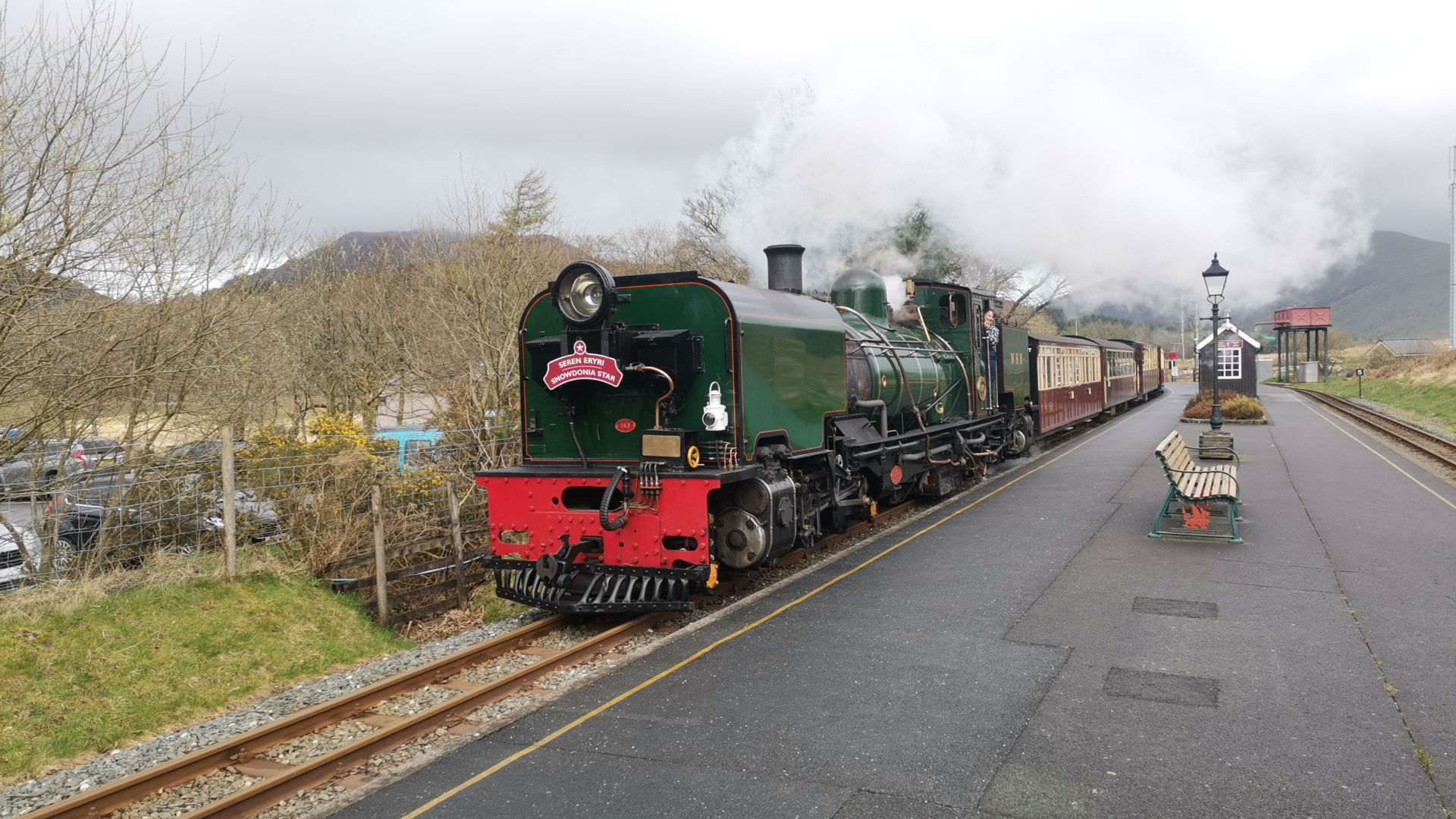
- Garratt NG143 in 2023 arriving into the Porthmadog Bound Platform April 2023

General information
- Location: Rhyd Ddu, Gwynedd; Wales
- Coordinates: 53.051444°N 4.133194°W
- Grid reference: SH571525
- System: Station on heritage railway
- Owner: Festiniog Railway Company
- Manager: Welsh Highland Railway
- Platforms: 2

History
- Original company: North Wales Narrow Gauge Railways

Key dates
- 1881: Opened
- late 1880s: Renamed to "Snowdon railway station"
- 1893: Renamed to "South Snowdon railway station"
- Summer 1934: Renamed to "Rhyd Ddu railway station"
- 26 September 1936: Closed
- 18 August 2003 on different site: Re-opened (using shortened Down platform)
- 8 April 2006: Expanded (following extension of island platform, and construction of the Up platform face)
Location

Rhyd Ddu is a station on the narrow gauge Welsh Highland Railway, which was built in 1881 as the North Wales Narrow Gauge Railways Moel Tryfan Undertaking to carry dressed slate to Dinas Junction on the LNWR. It has also previously been named both "Snowdon" and "South Snowdon".

"Rhyd Ddu" is Welsh for "Black Ford".

== A station for Snowdon ==
In the late 1880s, the construction of a railway up Snowdon from Llanberis was being seriously discussed. The NWNGR company renamed the station "Snowdon" as part of an effort to promote tourist traffic on their railway, especially amongst those who wanted to climb Wales' highest mountain. Some in Llanberis thought this misleading, but as contemporary literature pointed out -

"Visitors should bear in mind that in climbing Snowdon by this line (ours), they are conveyed by the "Toy" railway to a height of nearly 900 feet above sea level, so that they have quite two miles less to traverse from Snowdon station, compared to the Llanberis distance and about 800 feet less to reach the summit."

Visitors were by now alighting at this halt in droves, and nearby Beddgelert consequently received many more visitors. Horse-drawn road vehicles provided the link to Beddgelert, the connections being included in the railway's timetable. It was largely as a consequence of this that in 1893 a deputation of interested parties from Llanberis went to see landowner Mr Assheton-Smith, of the Vaenol Estate, who had previously been opposed to any railway up Snowdon, to try to convince him that Beddgelert was fast displacing Llanberis as the main centre for ascending the mountain. Assheton-Smith was ultimately convinced, and The Snowdon Mountain Tramroad and Hotels Co. Ltd. was established in November the following year.

Prior to the line's subsequent take-over by the Welsh Highland Railway, a report by Major Spring, commissioned by the Festiniog Railway, referred to "Rhyddu [sic] or Snowdon Station". After take-over, the line was extended southwards to Beddgelert and Porthmadog in 1923. The station name was first renamed to "South Snowdon" and renamed again in 1934 to Rhyd-Ddu.

== Closure ==
Passenger services ceased to the old station site on 26 September 1936.

== 2003 re-opening ==
Following reconstruction, the section from Waunfawr to Rhyd Ddu was formally reopened by the Prince of Wales on 30 July 2003. Prince Charles travelled from Waunfawr to Snowdon Ranger in the replica of a North Wales Narrow Gauge Railways coach, and from there to Rhyd Ddu on the footplate of the Ffestiniog Railway locomotive "Prince", built in 1863, which hauled the special train.

Public passenger services commenced on 18 August 2003 and the station was reopened to passengers on 18 August 2003 on a new site slightly to the east (the car park occupies the original site) following the complete reconstruction of the railway from Waunfawr to Rhyd Ddu. An honoured guest that day was Mr Richard Williams of Beddgelert who had travelled on the first train in 1923.

Train services are now operated by the Festiniog Railway Company's Welsh Highland Railway subsidiary.

== Facilities ==
Rhyd Ddu station is the starting point of the 'Rhyd Ddu' footpath to the summit of Snowdon.

There are public toilets and a car park adjoining the station. The Snowdonia Sherpa bus service to Beddgelert and Porthmadog or Pen-y-Pass calls at the station.

== Welsh Highland Railway Phase 4 and 2006 reconstruction ==
Work on Phase 4, the long final section of the Welsh Highland Railway from Rhyd Ddu to Porthmadog, started at Rhyd Ddu in 2005.

In February and March, 2006, the station underwent a large extension to allow through running trains to Porthmadog. This included two water towers for trains running in both directions, a "Rhyd Ddu Yard" with two sidings, one capable of stabling a train, and building a new southerly extension to the platform that extends it to the 200 m standard length platform of this route. There is also a waiting shelter and occasional ticket office. Trackwork modifications were completed to permit right-hand running (normal WHR and FR practice) into and through the station. Unfortunately, for the 2006 reopening of the station on 8 April, the trackwork for the Up loop had not been consolidated sufficiently to allow carriages to use the Porthmadog bound platform, due to a mechanical failure of the tamper. For the period between the reopening and 1 June 2006, when right hand running commenced, temporary operating instructions were in place whilst trains continued to run into the left hand line.

== Gallery ==
Northerly view of Rhyd Ddu station in the final stages of construction on 26 May 2003. Diesel loco Conway Castle hauls a PW train with a tamping machine in the background.

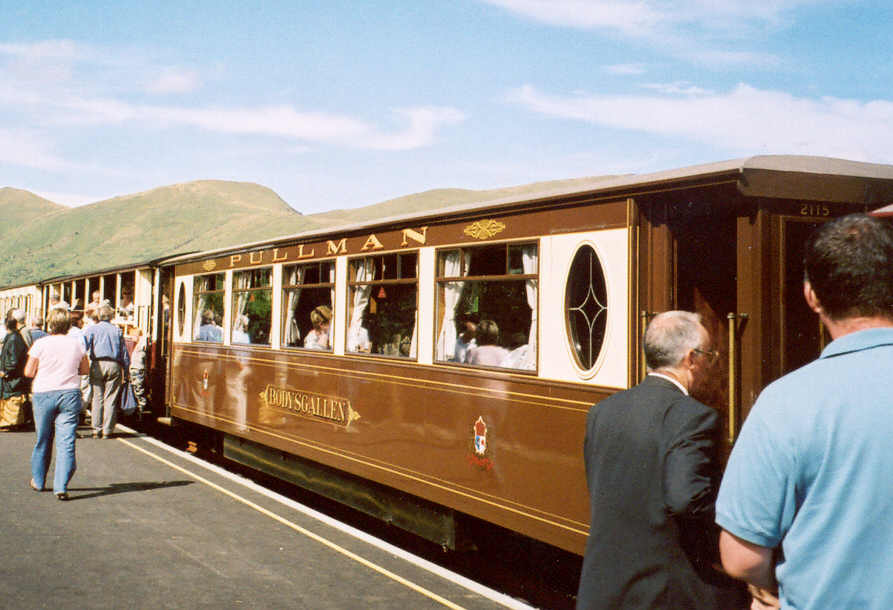
The Bodysgallen Pullman Car at Rhyd Ddu on the afternoon of 18 August 2003

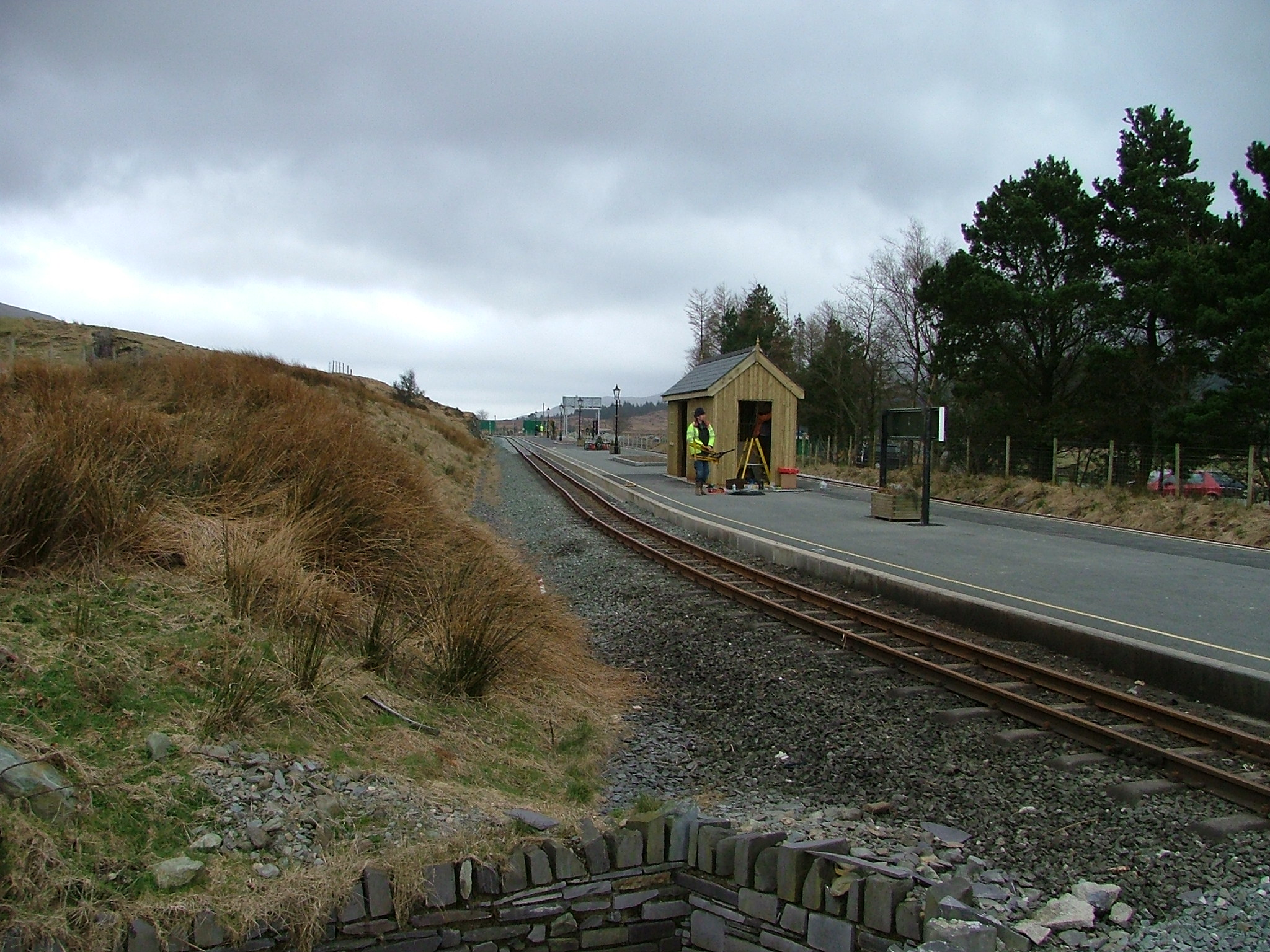
Looking south the evening (7 April 2006) before re-opening after major rebuilding in 2006

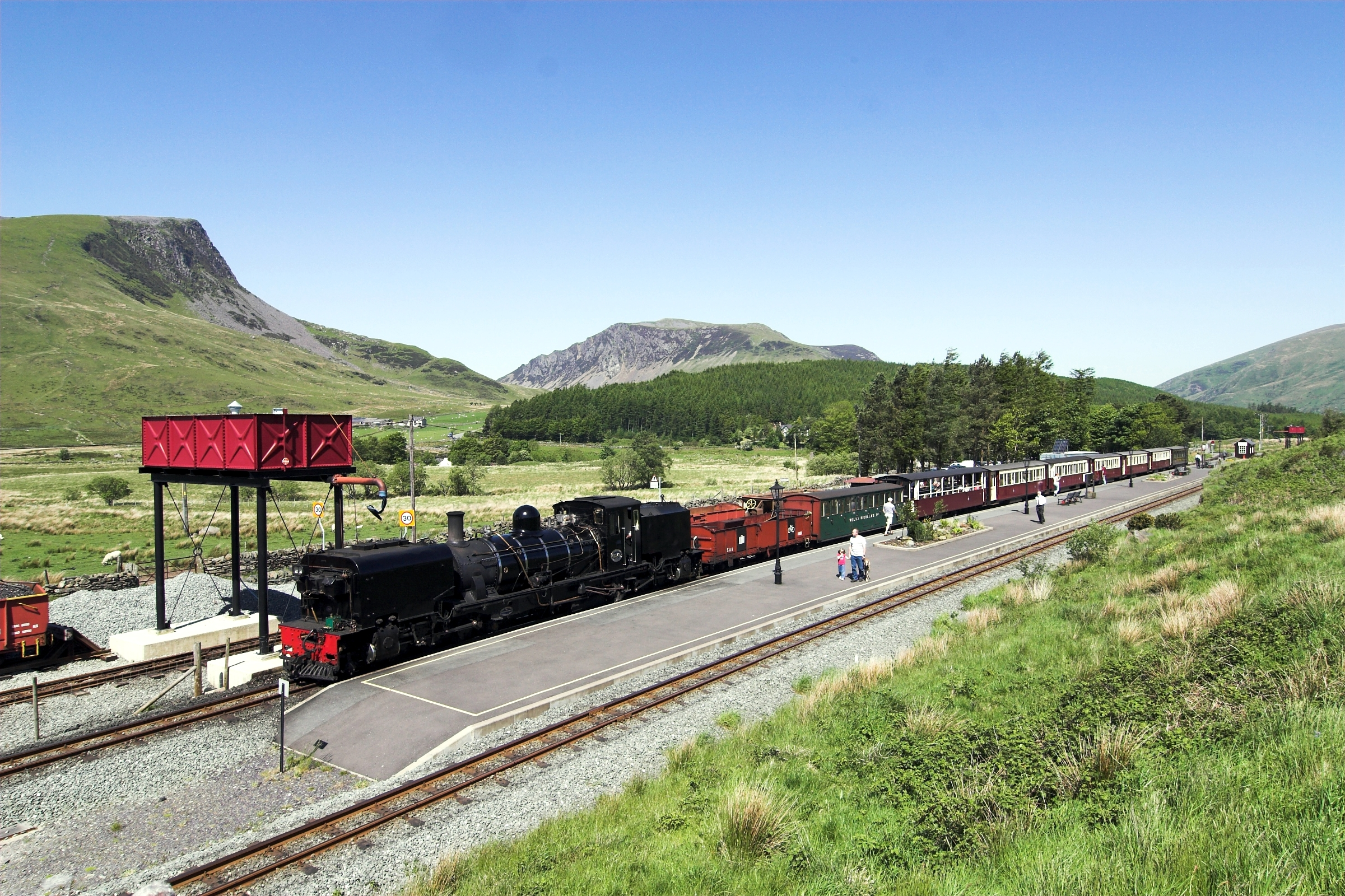
A train with NG143 heading for Beddgelert, May 2009

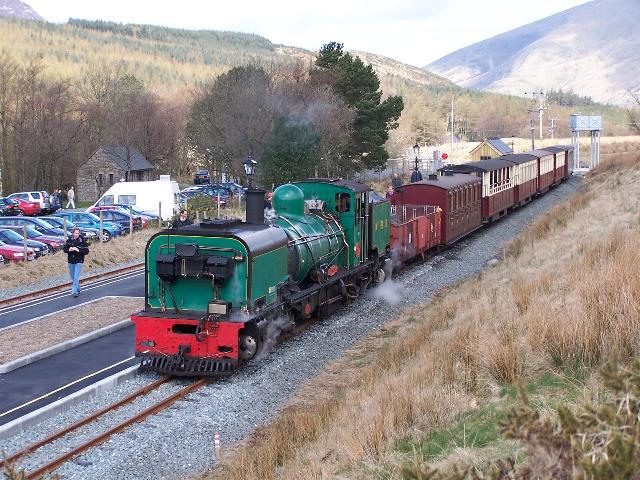
Garratt No.138 arrives in the Down Platform at the newly extended Rhyd Ddu station on 16 April 2006, during the period when the Up Platform was not available for use by carriages

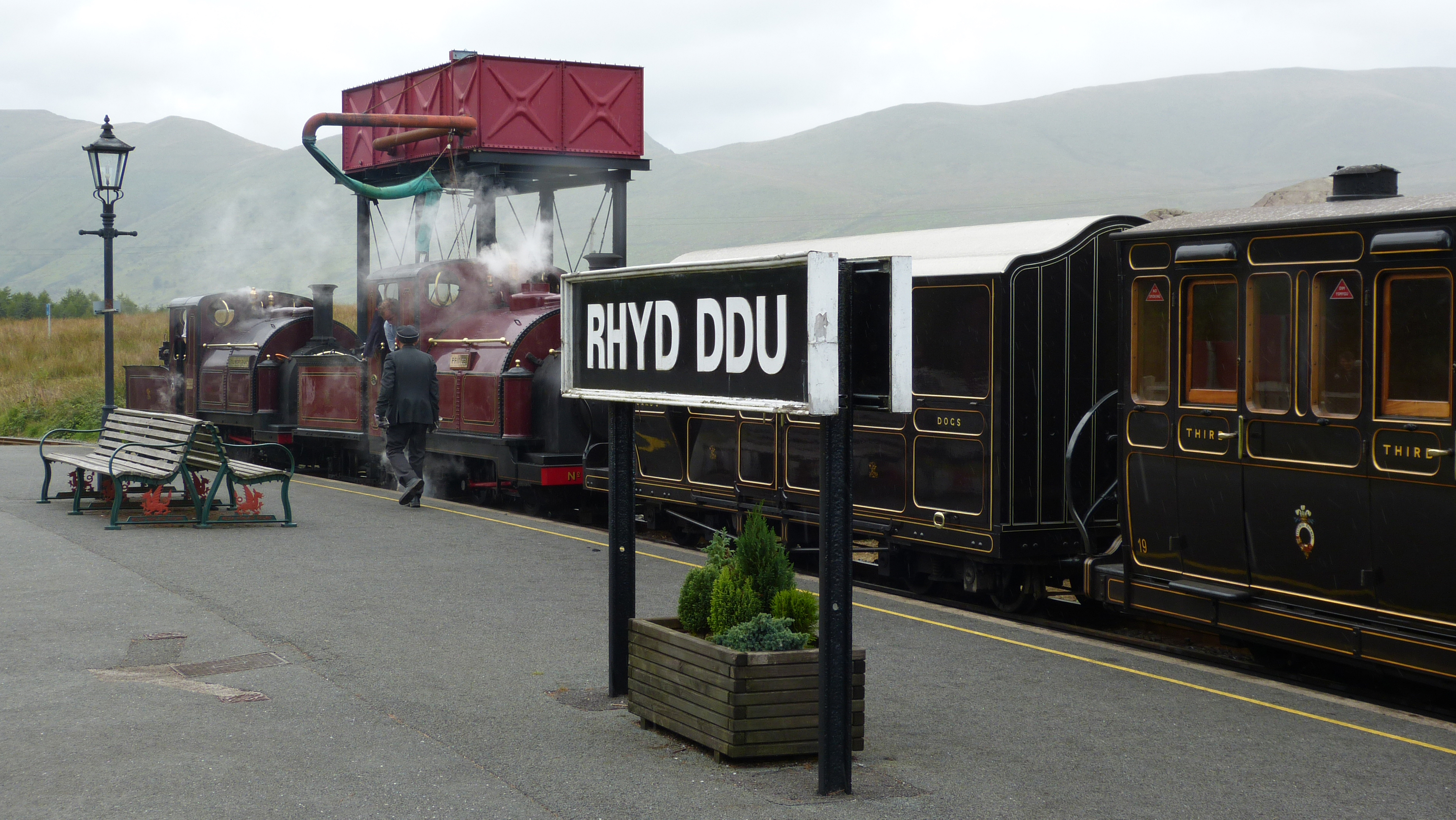
The Ffestiniog engines Palmerston and Prince arriving tender first at rainy Rhyd Ddu with vintage coaching stock.

Preceding station	Heritage railways	Following station
Snowdon Ranger towards Caernarfon	Welsh Highland Railway	Meillionen towards Porthmadog Harbour
Historical railways
Quellyn Lake	North Wales Narrow Gauge Railways	Terminus
Quellyn Lake	Welsh Highland Railway	Pitt's Head
