= Pitt's Head railway station =

Disused railway station in Rhyd-ddu, Gwynedd

Pitt's Head

General information
- Location: Rhyd-ddu, Gwynedd; Wales
- Coordinates: 53.0424°N 4.1255°W
- Grid reference: SH575515

Other information
- Status: Disused

History
- Original company: Welsh Highland Railway

Key dates
- 1 June 1923: Opened
- 28 September 1936: Closed
Location

Pitt's Head railway station co-served the village of Rhyd-ddu, Gwynedd, Wales, from 1923 to 1936 on the Welsh Highland Railway.

== History ==
The station was opened on 1 June 1923 by the Welsh Highland Railway. It closed on 28 September 1936.

| Preceding station | Disused railways | Following station |
|---|---|---|
| Rhyd Ddu; Line and station closed | Welsh Highland Railway | Hafod Ruffrydd Halt; Line and station closed |
