= Tryfan Junction railway station =

Railway station on the Welsh Highland Railway, Wales

Tryfan Junction
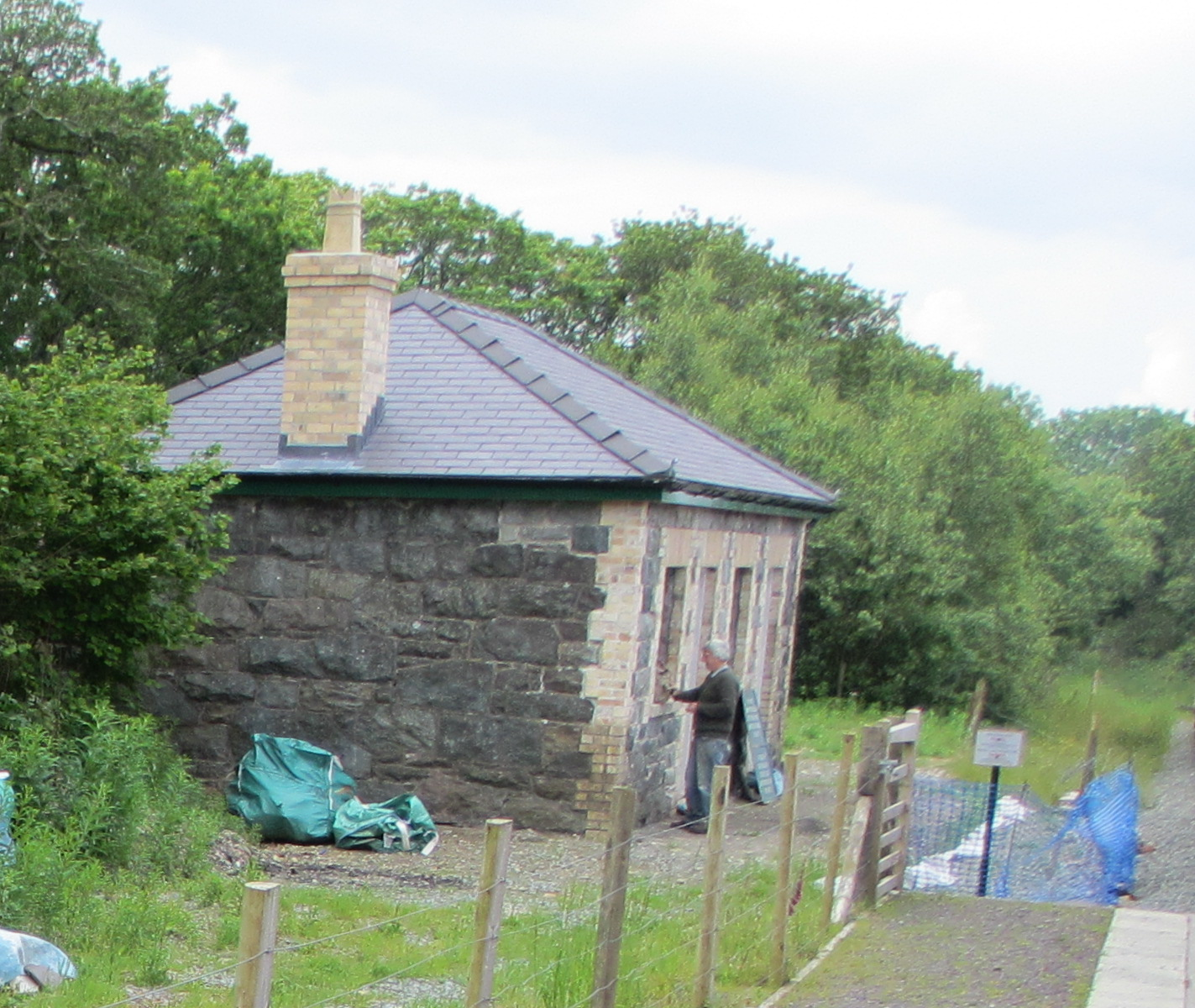
- The station in 2012

General information
- Location: Gwynedd; Wales
- Coordinates: 53.10795°N 4.23975°W
- Grid reference: SH501590
- System: Station on heritage railway
- Owner: Festiniog Railway
- Manager: 'Welsh Highland Heritage Group'
- Platforms: 1

History
- Original company: North Wales Narrow Gauge Railways

Key dates
- 1877: Opened
- 26 September 1936: Closed
- 2011: Re-opened as request stop
Location

Tryfan Junction is a junction station on the North Wales Narrow Gauge Railways for the main line and the Bryngwyn Branch. Opened in 1877, it closed in 1936 and the building fell into ruin. It was reopened as a request stop in 2011, and the station renovated.

== History ==
Originally built for the opening of traffic in 1877 by the North Wales Narrow Gauge Railways Company, the building became redundant when passenger services ceased on the Bryngwyn branch in 1914. The station building fell into disrepair following its closure in 1936 by the Welsh Highland Railway and it eventually became a roofless ruin.

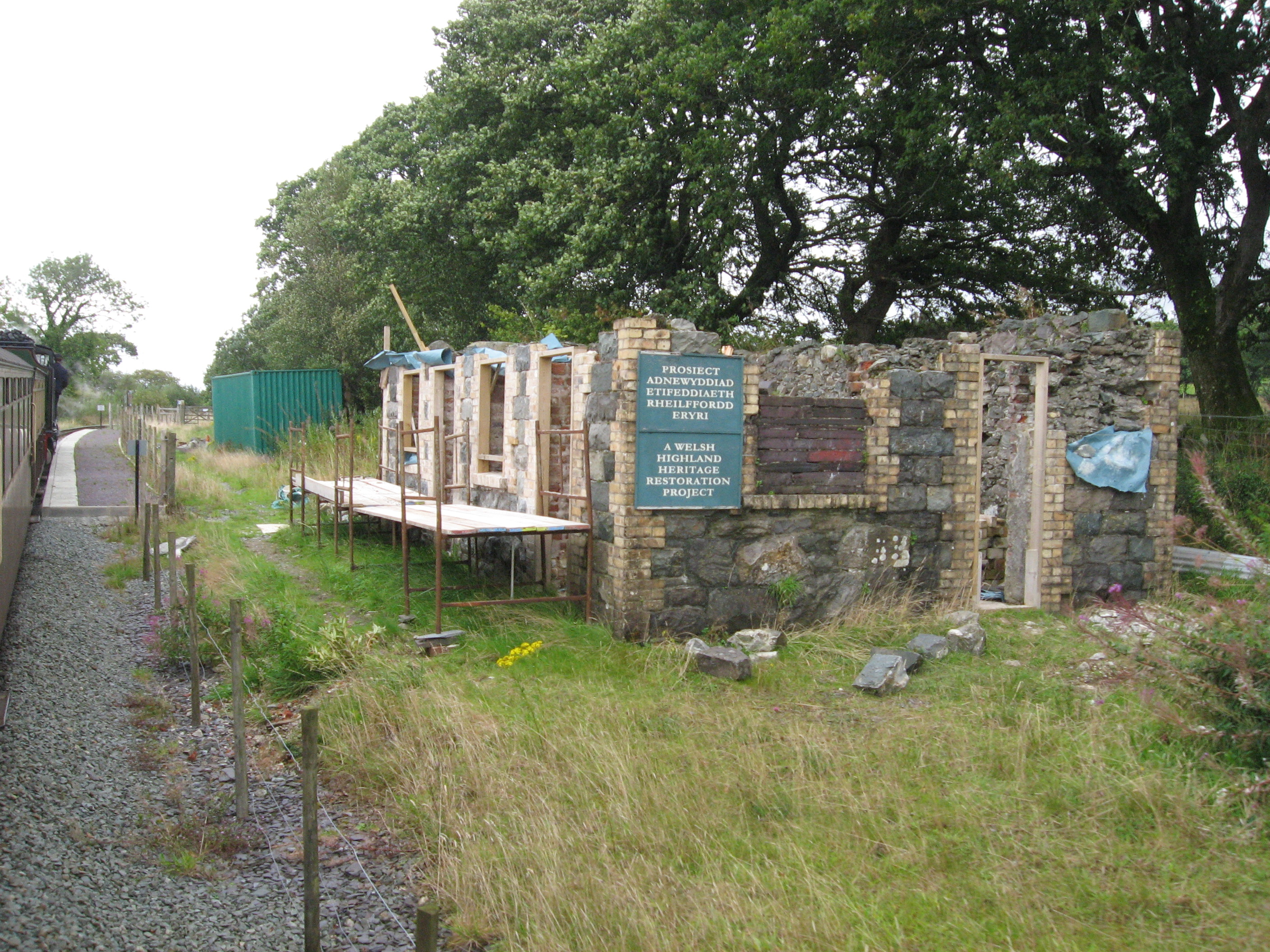
The station building under repair in 2011

This section of the WHR was restored in 2000 and work began in earnest 2009 on restoration of the station under the leadership of by the late John Keylock and driven by the determination of a small band of volunteers from the Welsh Highland Heritage Group. The first part, reconstruction of a platform, was completed in Spring 2010, but the only train to stop there in 2010 was a single "Sponsors Special". In 2011 with the commencement of the main operating season, it became a timetabled request stop. Work on the building continued and was completed in 2014.

For its extensive reconstruction of the building, the Welsh Highland Railway Heritage Group received the 2014 Volunteers' Award of the National Railway Heritage Awards scheme. On a wet and windy Saturday, 2 May 2015, some 40 people squeezed into the restored Tryfan Junction Station building. where John Ellis, chairman of National Railway Heritage Awards gave a brief speech. Sir Peter Hendy CBE, Commissioner Transport for London (now chairman of Network Rail) then unveiled the blue NRHA plaque to commemorate the award.

At the meeting the former chairman of the WHR Heritage Group, David Allan also paid tribute to the foresight and imagination of John Keylock who had died before seeing his dream completely realised. A commemorative slate tablet in the garden at the station carries John Keylock's sign off comment in his many telephone calls to David and others "Speak Anon"

Work continues to improve the facilities and heritage scene at Tryfan Junction which is now the ‘gateway’ to The Slate Trail along the trackbed of the closed Bryngwyn Branch.

Preceding station	Heritage railways	Following station
Dinas towards Caernarfon	Welsh Highland Railway	Waunfawr towards Porthmadog Harbour
Historical railways
Dinas Junction	Welsh Highland Railway	Waunfawr
junction station	Bryngwyn Branch	Rhostryfan

== See also ==
- North Wales Narrow Gauge Railways
