= Rhostryfan =

Coordinates: 53.096991°N 4.2474139°W

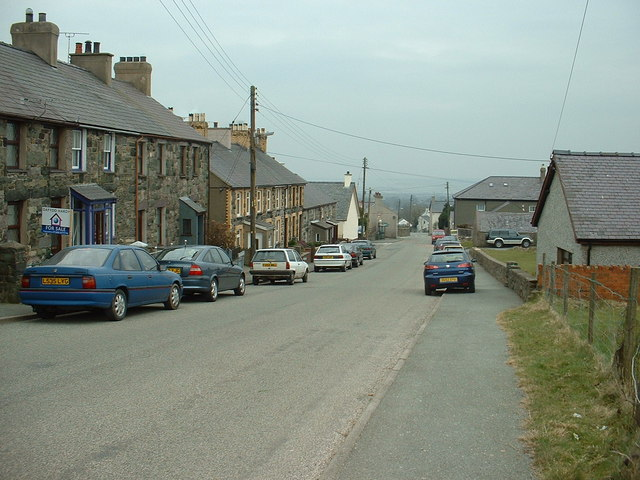

- Location within Gwynedd
- Area: 0.2050 km^{2} (0.0792 sq mi)
- Population: 722 (2020 estimate)
  - Density: 3,522/km^{2} (9,120/sq mi)
- Community: Llanwnda
- Principal area: Gwynedd
- Country: Wales
- Sovereign state: United Kingdom

Rhostryfan is a village 4 miles from Caernarfon, in the community of Llanwnda, in the principal area of Gwynedd, Wales. In 2020 it had an estimated population of 722. It was formerly served by Rhostryfan railway station.

== History ==
The "Rhos" part of the name means "a moor", the "tryfan" part means "high place".
