= John Richard Williams (poet) =

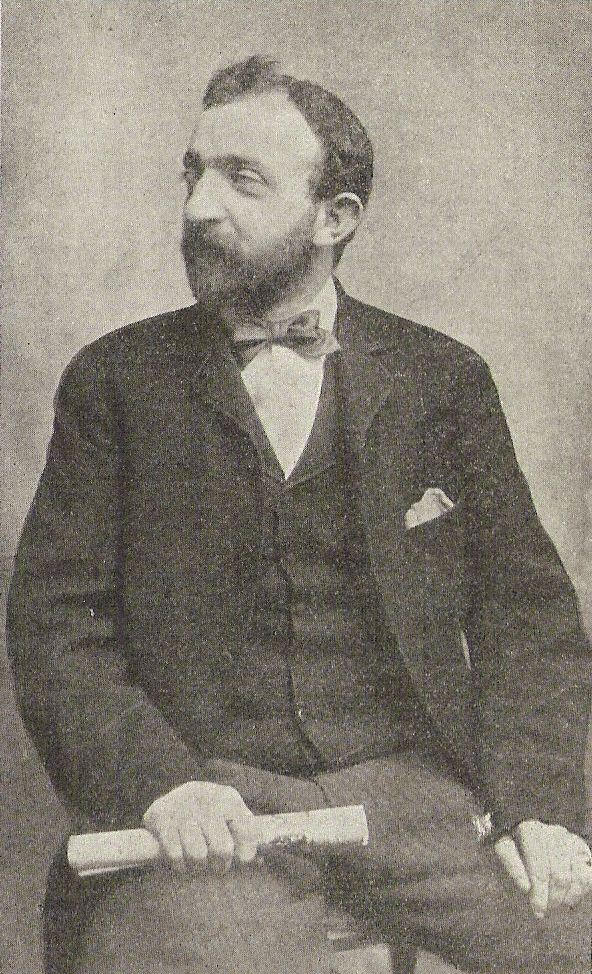
- Tryfanwy before 1910
- Born: 29 September 1867; Rhostryfan, Caernarfonshire
- Died: 19 March 1924 (aged 56)
- Burial place: Portmadoc
- Other names: J. R. Tryfanwy, Tryfanwy

John Richard Williams (29 September 1867 – 19 March 1924), often referred to as J. R. Tryfanwy or simply by his bardic name Tryfanwy, was a Welsh-language lyrical poet. He was born in the village of Rhostryfan in the old county of Caernarfonshire (Gwynedd), north Wales. He is buried at Portmadoc.
