= John Williams (archdeacon of Switzerland) =

English Anglican priest (born 1948)

John Richard Williams (born 1948) was Archdeacon of Switzerland from 2004 to 2006.

Williams was educated at Rhodes University and King's College, London and ordained in 1974.
