= North Wales Narrow Gauge Railways =

Defunct railway company in Wales (1877–1916)

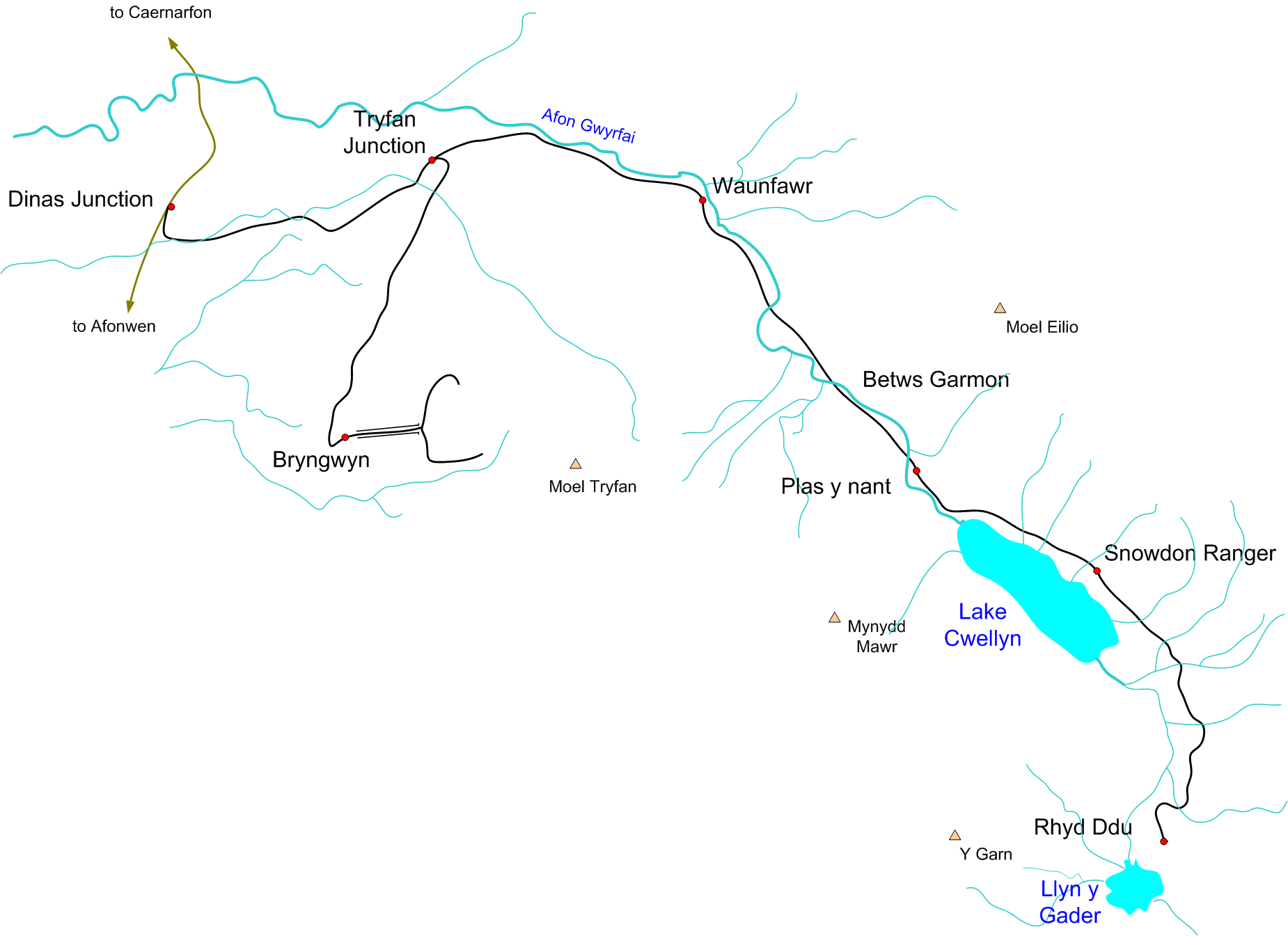
- Map of the NWNGR

Overview
- Locale: Wales
- Dates of operation: 1877–1916
- Successor: Welsh Highland Railway

Technical
- Track gauge: 1 ft 11 1/2 in (597 mm)
- Length: 12 1/2 miles (20.1 km)

North Wales Narrow Gauge Railways Act 1872
- Act of Parliament
- Parliament of the United Kingdom
- Long title: An Act for incorporating the North Wales Narrow Gauge Railways Company; and for other purposes.
- Citation: 35 & 36 Vict. c. clxxv

Dates
- Royal assent: 6 August 1872

Text of statute as originally enacted

The North Wales Narrow Gauge Railways (NWNGR) was a railway company that planned to build a number of inter-connected 1 ft 11 1/2 in (597 mm) narrow-gauge railways across North Wales. The first two of these lines – jointly known as the "Moel Tryfan Undertaking" – were authorised by act of Parliament, the North Wales Narrow Gauge Railways Act 1872 (35 & 36 Vict. c. clxxv) and were built and opened in the 1870s. The original main line ran from Dinas Junction to Bryngwyn and opened in 1877. The second line was a branch from Tryfan Junction to South Snowdon, though shortly after opening, the company designated the Tryfan Junction to Bryngwyn section as the branch, and the Dinas Junction to South Snowdon section as the main line.

== Routes built ==
The company completed construction of two lines. The first, opened in 1877, was approximately 3 miles (4.8 km) long, running south-east from a junction with the London and North Western Railway's Caernarfon to Afon Wen branch at Dinas Junction, to Bryngwyn. There were intermediate stations at Tryfan Junction and Rhostryfan. From Bryngwyn, a shallow incline climbed the northern flank of Moel Tryfan. From the top of the incline a number of quarry tramways connected to the Alexandra quarry, Moel Tryfan quarry, Fron quarry, Braich quarry and Cilgwyn quarry.

The second line was opened in stages, and completed in 1881. It connected Tryfan Junction to South Snowdon, a distance of about 5 miles (8.0 km). There were intermediate stations at Waunfawr, Bettws Garmon and Snowdon Ranger. The line from Dinas Junction to South Snowdon was considered the main line from about 1878, with the Tryfan Junction to Bryngwyn section as the branch. South Snowdon station was later renamed Rhyd Ddu.

== Routes planned ==
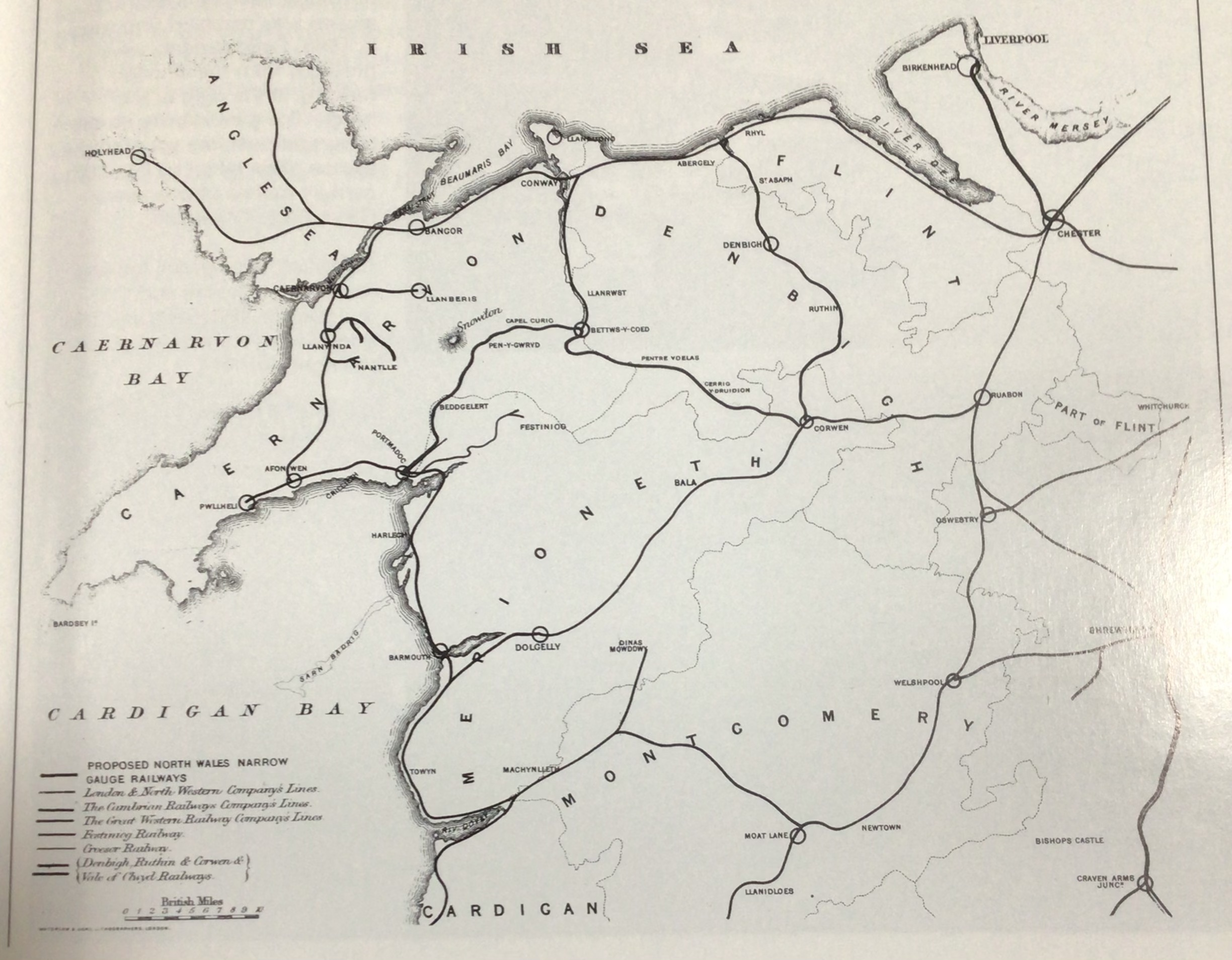
Map showing NWNGR proposed lines. The original map is coloured ― the "General Undertaking" runs from Porthmadog to Corwen, the "Moel Tryfan" Undertaking from Llanwnda.

The line from Dinas Junction to Rhyd Ddu was built, with a short branch from Tryfan Junction to Bryngwyn, and operated, but this was just a small part of the grand scheme for a network of narrow-gauge railways spanning much of northern Wales. The North Wales Narrow Gauge Railway was intended to run from Caernarvon via Beddgelert to Portmadoc (where it would link with the Festiniog), with a second and very long line from Beddgelert to Bettws-y-Coed and across a long stretch of open country to Corwen, totaling some 60 miles had these lines been built. All lines were specified to be of a gauge between 2 ft. and 2 ft. 9 in., though the railways proposed were not all connected. The master plan to link almost all the larger places in north-west Wales by narrow-gauge railway included the following proposed lines:

1. To extend from a Junction with the Portmadoc, Croesor & Beddgelert Tram Railway Company's proposed line to Beddgelert, thence to Pen-y-gwryd via Nant Gwynant involving reversing spirals of two chains radius. Thence to Capel Curig and Bettws-y-Coed.
2. From Bettws-y-Coed, following alongside the route of Holyhead-London road to a point three miles west of Corwen.
3. From end of Railway No. 2 into Corwen, terminating behind the standard gauge railway station of the Great Western Railway.

North Wales Narrow Gauge Railways (Extensions, &c.) Act 1885
- Act of Parliament
- Parliament of the United Kingdom
- Long title: An Act to empower the North Wales Narrow Gauge Railways Company to improve their Railway by extending it to Carnarvon Harbour and by constructing other Railways and works and for other purposes.
- Citation: 48 & 49 Vict. c. cxxxiv

Dates
- Royal assent: 31 July 1885

Text of statute as originally enacted

An act of Parliament, the North Wales Narrow Gauge Railways (Extensions, &c.) Act 1885 (48 & 49 Vict. c. cxxxiv) authorised an extension northwards to Caernarfon and a light railway order of 1900 authorised an extension southwards to Beddgelert.

A further part of the scheme was the North Wales Narrow Gauge Railways (General Undertaking) which planned a route from Porthmadog to Beddgelert, where it would meet the Rhyd Ddu-Beddgelert extension. From there the line would travel via Capel Curig to Betws-y-Coed. A further branch would have extended the line from Betws-y-Coed to Corwen via Cerrig-y-Drudion where the railway would meet the planned Ruthin and Cerrig-y-Drudion Railway.

A short, separate line from Pwllheli (adjacent to the Cambrian Railways' terminus of that period) to Porthdinllaen was also proposed.

The General Undertaking was authorised by the North Wales Narrow Gauge Railways Act 1872 but officially abandoned in 1876. The section from Porthmadog to Beddgelert was eventually completed by the Welsh Highland Railway as part of its construction, and utilised parts of the Croesor Tramway and the aborted Portmadoc, Beddgelert and South Snowdon Railway (PBSSR) works.

== South Snowdon ==
There are two locations which have been called South Snowdon. One is Rhyd Ddu and the other is the South Snowdon Quarry in the Nant Gwynant Pass and this was the original intended destination of the Portmadoc, Beddgelert and South Snowdon Railway. That company later applied for and received a light railway order to build from Beddgelert to Rhyd Ddu and commenced construction on that section around 1906. All the known photographs of the station at Rhyd Ddu taken prior to 1914 show a station nameboard SNOWDON.

== History ==
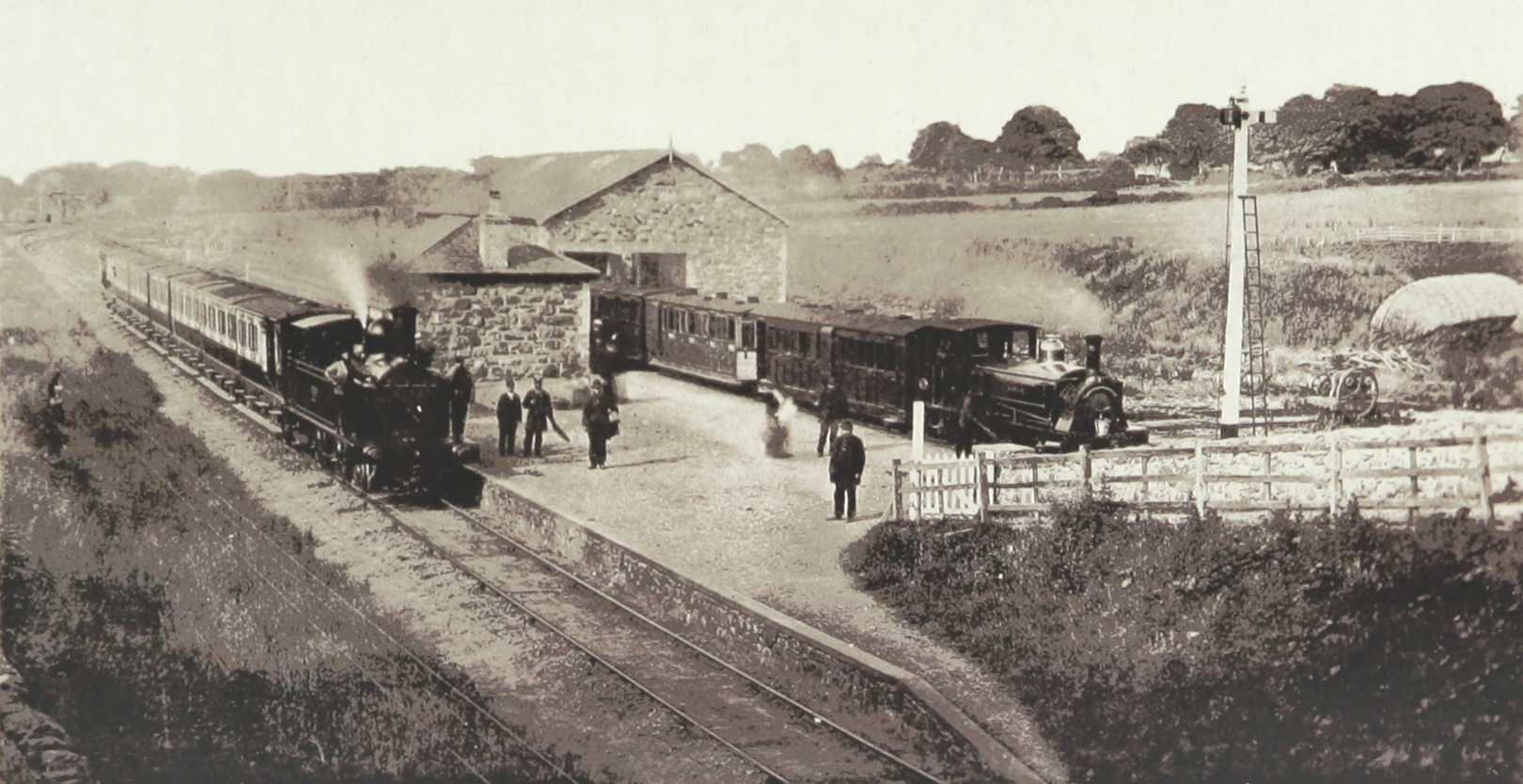
Dinas station in 1883. A NWNGR train with Beddgelert and a LNWR train are waiting on the platforms.

The company was formed in 1871, and authorised by the North Wales Narrow Gauge Railways Act 1872, to build "certain railways in the counties of Carnarvon and Merioneth" and to raise £216,000 in capital. In 1871, the company appointed Charles Easton Spooner, as their chief engineer. Spooner was then the manager of the Festiniog Railway and had been instrumental in the design of their steam locomotives in the 1860s.

North Wales Narrow Gauge Railways Act 1876
- Act of Parliament
- Parliament of the United Kingdom
- Long title: An Act to authorise the abandonment of the Railway No. 1 authorised by "The North Wales Narrow Gauge Railways Act, 1872," and to enable the North Wales Narrow Gauge Railways Company to raise further capital; and for other purposes.
- Citation: 39 & 40 Vict. c. cxxv

Dates
- Royal assent: 13 July 1876

Text of statute as originally enacted

By 1876, £66,000 had been raised in capital, the whole amount authorised to pay for the "Moeltryfan Undertaking", but the company needed further capital and applied to Parliament for a second act of Parliament, the North Wales Narrow Gauge Railways Act 1876 (39 & 40 Vict. c. cxxv) in April that year. This second act allowed the company to abandon its "General Undertaking", which would have extended the line to Bettws-y-Coed and beyond. By December of that year, Spooner reported that all but 3 miles (4.8 km) of the line had been built and was "nearly ready to open to traffic" and that mineral traffic would commence immediately.

The line from Dinas Junction to Tryfan Junction and on to Bryngwyn was opened in 1877. In 1878, a branch was built from Tryfan Junction to Snowdon Ranger and this was extended to South Snowdon (later renamed Rhyd Ddu) in 1881. In 1884, the company began the process of relaying the track, upgrading from iron rails weighing 35 lbs per yard, to steel rails weighing 41.5 lbs per yard. At the October 1887 board meeting of the company, a proposal to extend the line from Dinas Junction to Carnarvon was passed unanimously. This extension was never built.

In 1900, the railway company was granted permission for an extension of the main line from South Snowdon to Beddgelert. This was the North Wales Narrow Gauge Railways (Beddgelert Light Railway Extension) Order 1900, which allowed the extension to be built under the Light Railways Act 1896. This extension was not built.

In 1905, the Board of Trade granted permission for the whole railway to convert to a light railway under the Light Railways Act 1896. In 1906, Sir James Szlumper joined the board of directors, and by 1910 he had been elected chairman of the board. The 1910 report showed that six-month net revenues had fallen to £200 amidst a general depression in the country. The difficult financial situation caused the company caused to attempt to find a buyer. In 1910, they approached the London and North Western Railway – who owned the Carnarvon to Afon Wen branch – and negotiations proceeded far enough that the acquisition was announced, but it was not completed.

In 1914, a combined committee of several local authorities applied for a light railway order to combine the NWNGR with the Portmadoc, Beddgelert and South Snowdon Railway which owned the Croesor Tramway. The accelerating conflict of the First World War stopped this effort. The NWNGR shut down their passenger services in 1916, and from then on ran a shoestring goods service. In 1918, the application was revived by the owners of the Aluminium Corporation of Dolgarrog which had acquired the Portmadoc, Beddgelert and South Snowdon Railway and was seeking to acquire the NWNGR. This effort eventually led to the acquisition of the NWNGR by the Aluminium Corporation and its incorporation into the Welsh Highland Railway in 1922.

== Locomotives ==
Name	Builder	Type	Date	Works number	Notes
Snowdon Ranger	Vulcan Foundry	0-6-4T	1875	739	Single Fairlie locomotive. Scrapped by 1919; major components used to repair Moel Tryfan
Moel Tryfan	Vulcan Foundry	0-6-4T	1875	738	Single Fairlie locomotive. Transferred to the Welsh Highland Railway in 1922; scrapped by the Ffestiniog Railway in 1954.
Beddgelert	Hunslet	0-6-4ST	1878	206	Mainly worked the Bryngwyn branch. Scrapped 1906.
Russell	Hunslet	2-6-2T	1906	901	Ordered by the Portmadoc, Beddgelert and South Snowdon Railway, paid for by the North Wales Power & Traction Co Ltd, for the NWNGR and later became part of the Welsh Highland Railway stock.
Gowrie	Hunslet	0-6-4T	1908	979	Single Fairlie locomotive; sold in 1918 to the government, most likely the Ministry of Munitions. Sold later in 1918 to railway contractor J. F. Wake, where Gowrie was rebuilt. Supplied with spare parts in 1924, and scrapped after 1928.
Palmerston	George England	0-4-0ST+T	1867	unknown	Loaned by the Ffestiniog Railway between May 1876 and July 1877 to assist in the construction of the NWNGR.

== See also ==
- British narrow-gauge railways
- British narrow-gauge slate railways
- Slate operations on the WHR
