= Waunfawr railway station =

Railway station on the Welsh Highland Railway, Wales

Waunfawr
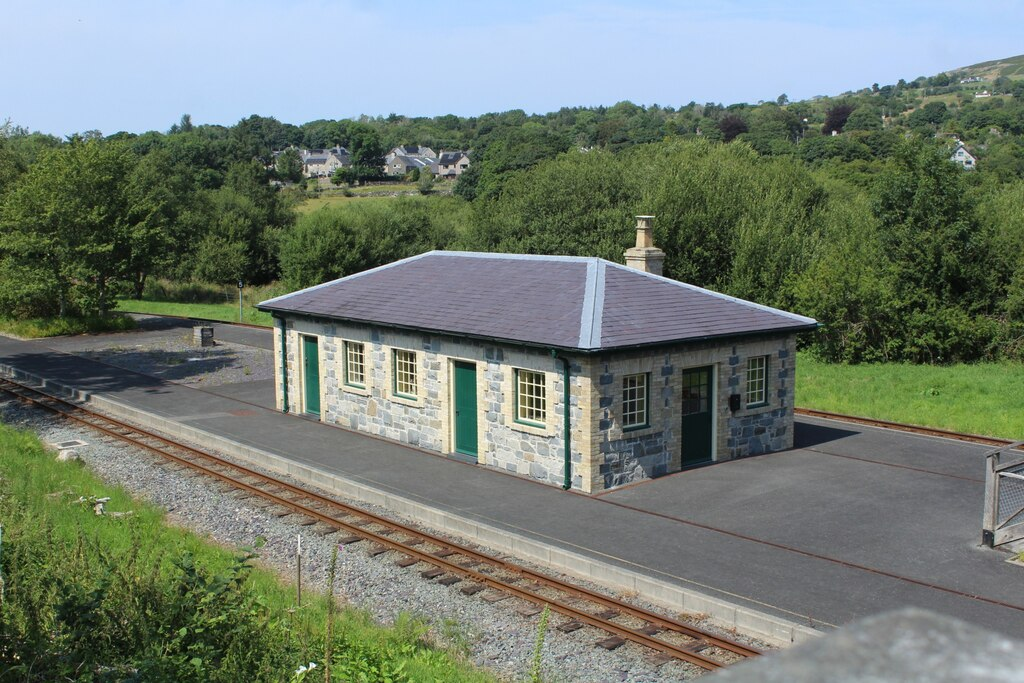
- The restored station building

General information
- Location: Waunfawr, Gwynedd; Wales
- Coordinates: 53.106°N 4.202°W
- Grid reference: SH527587
- System: Station on heritage railway
- Owner: Festiniog Railway Company
- Manager: Welsh Highland Railway
- Platforms: 2

History
- Original company: North Wales Narrow Gauge Railways

Key dates
- 1877: Opened
- 26 September 1936: Closed
- 7 August 2000: Reopened
Location

Waunfawr is a station on the narrow gauge Welsh Highland Railway, located to the south of the village of the same name. It was built in 1877 by the North Wales Narrow Gauge Railways as part of their Moel Tryfan Undertaking, to carry dressed slate to Dinas Junction on the London and North Western Railway. Passenger services ceased on 26 September 1936 as the then-Welsh Highland Railway went into administration. It was reopened on 7 August 2000 following the reconstruction of the railway from Dinas to Waunfawr as part of the restored Welsh Highland Railway.

== Restoration ==
In 2000, in order to remodel the layout of the station, the old building was carefully taken down. Although carefully dismantled by the Welsh Highland Heritage Group, the numbered and stored stone was inadvertently used as fill for the embankments, or to build a stone wall, by the contractor.

Following reconstruction, the section from Waunfawr to Rhyd Ddu was formally reopened by the Prince of Wales on 30 July 2003. Prince Charles travelled from Waunfawr to Rhyd Ddu by special train.

The station flower and shrub beds were laid out and are maintained by the local community enterprise charity, Antur Waunfawr. The Snowdonia Park Hotel adjoins the station and was built originally as the station master's house. Entrance to and exit from the station platform is by way of the hotel car park. The station footbridge links with a car park and a caravan park. Snowdonia Sherpa Bus services call at the station.

In 2018–19, after a substantial donation, the station building was rebuilt in the style of the original NWNG building of 1877, but to modern building standards.

Preceding station	Heritage railways	Following station
Tryfan Junction towards Caernarfon	Welsh Highland Railway	Plas-y-Nant towards Porthmadog Harbour
Historical railways
Tryfan Junction	Welsh Highland Railway	Betws Garmon

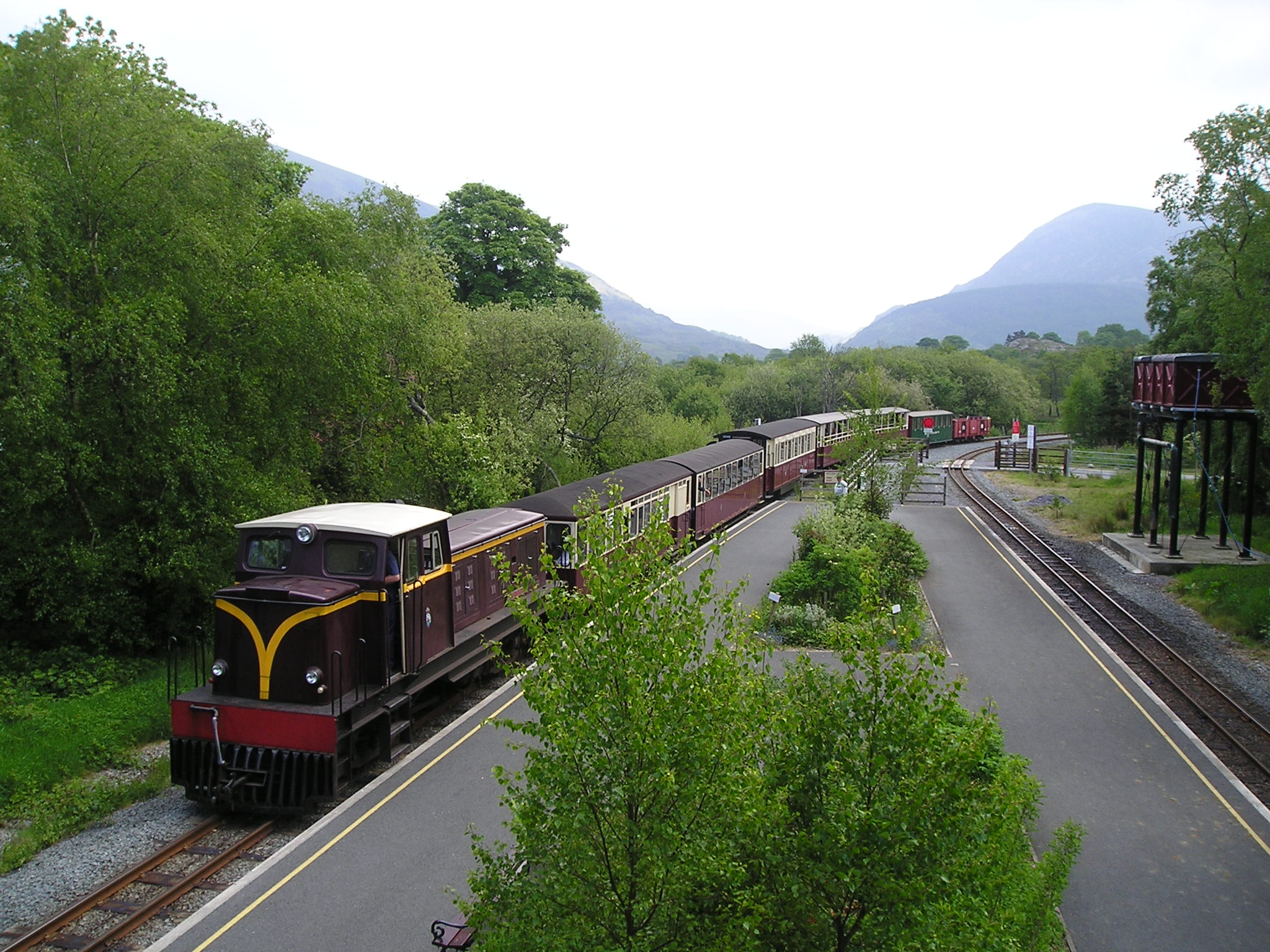
Down train arriving at Waunfawr from Rhyd Ddu, powered by diesel locomotive "Castell Caernarfon" on 26 May 2004

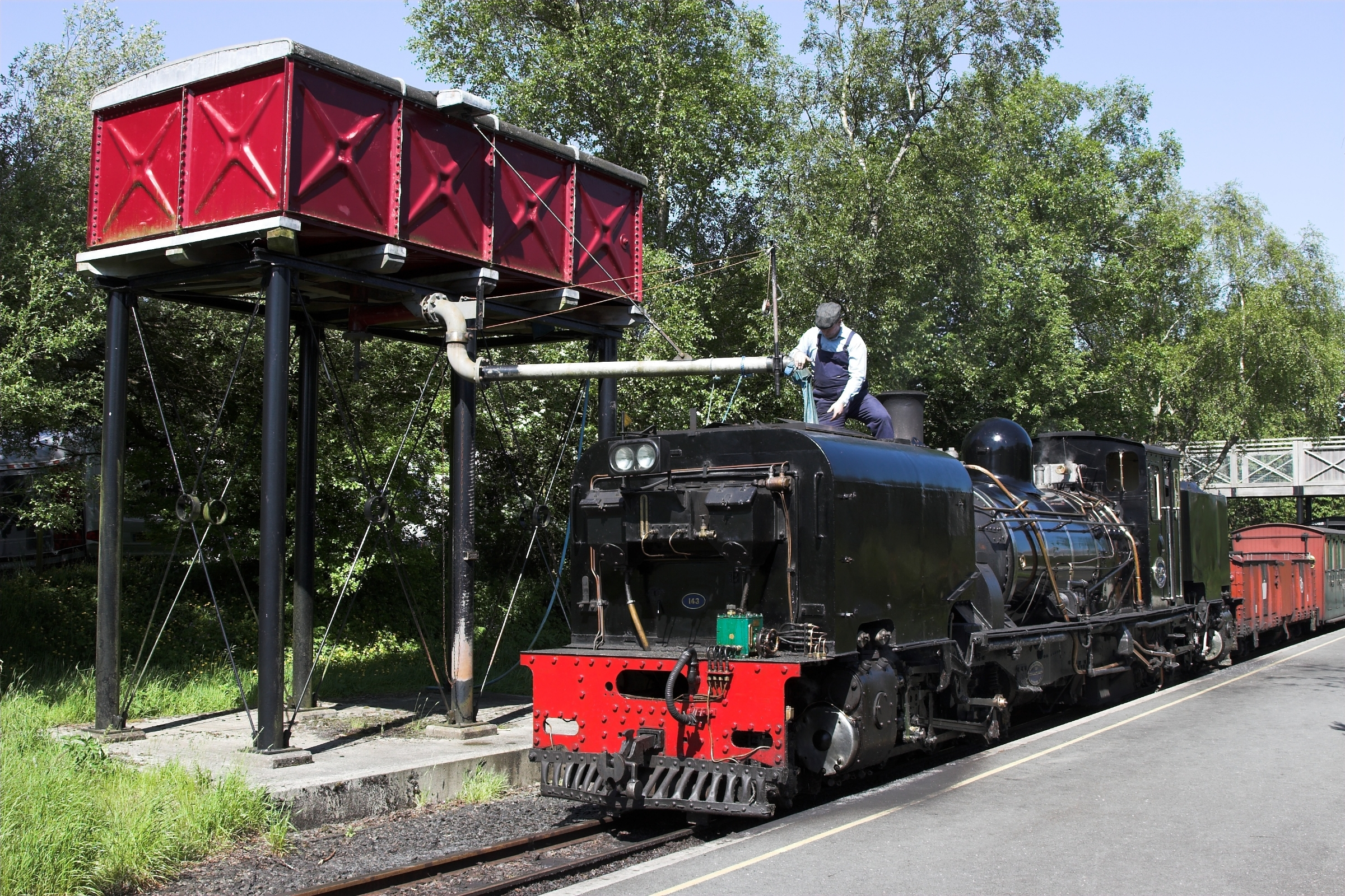
NG143 at Waunfawr water tower

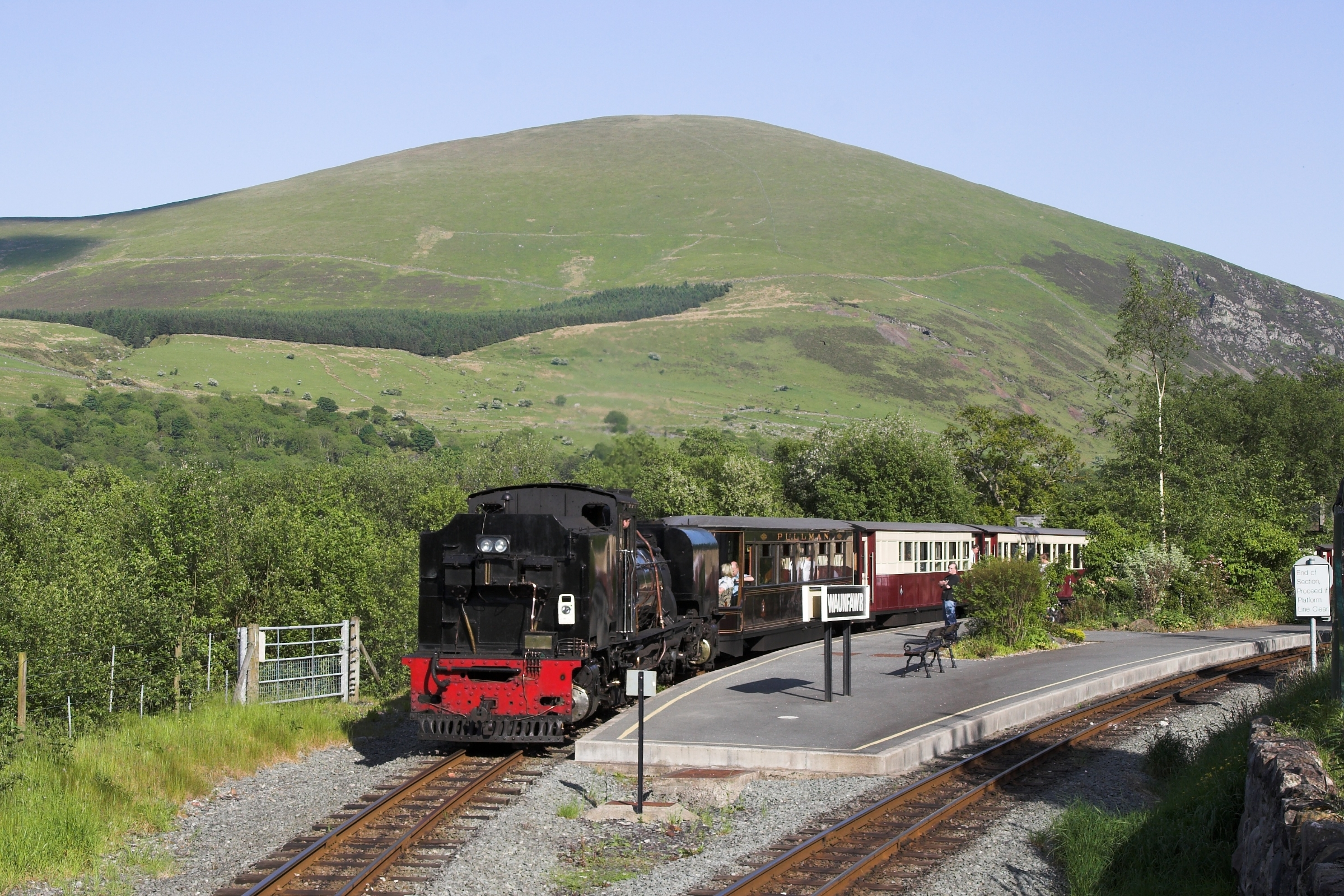
Train with NG143 heading for Caernarfon

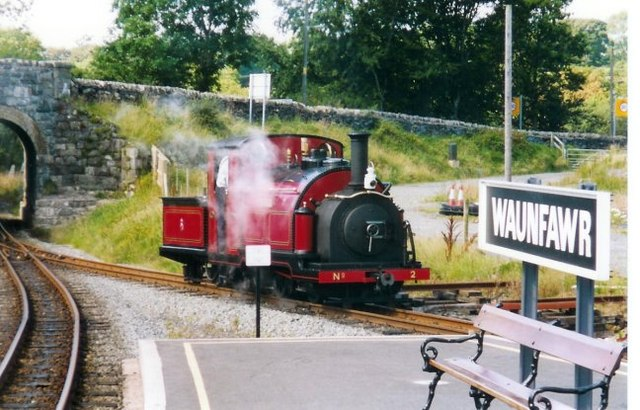
Prince at Waunfawr
