= Welsh Highland Railway rolling stock =

Welsh Highland Railway rolling stock may refer to:

- The rolling stock of the original railway (1922–1936), including the locomotives Moel Tryfan and Russell - see Welsh Highland Railway
- The rolling stock of the Welsh Highland Railway Ltd who operate the Welsh Highland Railway (Porthmadog) - see List of Welsh Highland Railway Ltd rolling stock
- The rolling stock of the Welsh Highland Railway (Caernarfon) owned by the Festiniog Railway Company - see List of Welsh Highland Railway (Caernarfon) rolling stock
