= List of Welsh Highland Railway rolling stock =

This is a list of the rolling stock owned by the Ffestiniog Railway Company which is used to operate the Welsh Highland Railway.

== Steam locomotives ==
Number	Wheel arrangement	Date built	Builder	Class	Available for Service	Notes
K1	0-4-0+0-4-0	1909	Beyer, Peacock and Company	K	Yes	Ex Tasmanian Government Railways K class, the world's first Garratt locomotive. Restored and entered service in autumn 2006. Converted to coal firing. Operational after being overhauled in 2020. On loan to Statfold Barn Railway.
87	2-6-2+2-6-2	1937	Cockerill	NGG16	Yes	Ex South African Railways NGG 16 Class Garratt. Spent much of its working life in South Africa until it was replaced by diesel traction. Purchased from Exmoor Steam Centre, who imported it to the UK. Underwent a major restoration at Boston Lodge Works. Coal fired. Initially outshopped in photographic grey livery on completion in 2009 and was then painted into midnight blue livery from March 2010. Ten-yearly overhaul was completed in 2020, with the locomotive now painted in South African Railways black with SAR/SAS logo on the coal bunker. At the start of 2024 during winter maintenance, 87s whistle was moved to in front of the regulator dome to reduce the noise in the cab due to concerns over potential hearing issues.
109	2-6-2+2-6-2	1939	Beyer, Peacock and Company	NGG16	No	Ex South African Railways NGG16 Class Garratt. Purchased in 2009 from Exmoor Steam Railway by pop music producer and rail enthusiast Pete Waterman for use on the WHR. Initially it was overhauled at Waterman's LNWR heritage works in Crewe by apprentices as part of their studies. It was moved to Dinas on the Welsh Highland Railway in January 2014 after it was unable to be completed at Crewe because the government pulled out of the apprenticeship scheme. Stored awaiting restoration.
130	2-6-2+2-6-2	1951	Beyer, Peacock and Company	NGG16	Yes	Ex South African Railways NGG16 Class Garratt. Purchased in 2014 from Exmoor Steam Railway by Steam Powered Services and currently owned by Peter Best. A new boiler has been constructed at the South Devon Railway (heritage railway) whilst the power units have been rebuilt at Dinas. Having first moved under its own steam on 5 February 2021, the locomotive hauled its first (private) passenger train on 30 April 2021. Currently painted in a "Burrell Plum" livery.
133	2-8-2	1953	Société Anglo-Franco-Belge	NG15	No	Ex South African Railways NG15 Class Unrestored. In 2009 the loco was displayed in Caernarfon town square to collect donations for the restoration of its sister loco, number 134.
134	2-8-2	1953	Société Anglo-Franco-Belge	NG15	Yes	Ex South African Railways NG15 Class. Under restoration at Dinas. Some preparatory works had been carried out on 134 between 1999 and 2006, however, following the return to service of K1 in 2006 the restoration of 134 has been restarted in earnest. The frames were re-wheeled in February 2021.
138	2-6-2+2-6-2	1958	Beyer, Peacock and Company	NGG16	No	Ex South African Railways NGG16 Class Garratt, red livery. Entered service in 1997 in unlined dark green, then malachite green as of 2002 when it was named, withdrawn in late 2007 and stripped for 10 year boiler inspection. Re-entered service in 2010 in crimson lake livery. Withdrawn in 2020 for a ten-yearly overhaul.
140	2-6-2+2-6-2	1958	Beyer, Peacock and Company	NGG16	No	Ex South African Railways NGG 16 Class Garratt, red livery. Currently dismantled and awaiting restoration at Dinas. After initial work done at Dinas, 140's boiler has been overhauled by Peter Waterman's LNWR works. In 2010 140's boiler was restored for use on 143, in order to speed up that locomotive's overhaul.
143	2-6-2+2-6-2	1958	Beyer, Peacock and Company	NGG16	Yes	Ex South African Railways NGG16 Class Garratt, green livery. This was the last locomotive built by Beyer, Peacock and Company in Manchester. Entered service in plain black livery in 1998, but was due for boiler recertification in 2009. 143's bogies were both taken out of service and the loco ran on 138's bogies until it left service. 143 re-entered service in 2011 in green livery for the Fairlies, Garratts and Mallets competition. A major overhaul on its power units was completed in May 2016, taking 18 months. Withdrawn from service in 2020, received a new boiler and re-entered service end of 2022. Was hit by a car in October 2022 at a crossing around Beddgelert forest.

== Diesel locomotives ==
Number	Name	Wheel arrangement	Date built	Builder	Notes
	Castell Caernarfon	B-B	1967	CH Funkey & Co	This 335 hp diesel hydraulic locomotive was built for work in a diamond mine and was later used for cement traffic at Port Elizabeth, South Africa. It is one of a pair imported by the Ffestiniog Railway, the other (Vale of Ffestiniog) being re-bodied to fit the FR loading gauge. It was the first locomotive to be moved to Dinas, in January 1997. In service on newly refurbished bogies. Unlike other diesels purchased by the Ffestiniog Railway Company and named bilingually after Northern Welsh castles, 'Castell Caernarfon' is named in Welsh only.
	Upnor Castle	4wDM	1954	F.C. Hibberd	This 180 hp Gardner 6LXB diesel-engined locomotive was built for R.N. Chattenden and Upnor Railway. Sold to Welshpool and Llanfair Railway in 1962 and to the Ffestiniog Railway in 1968 and re-gauged. Transferred Dinas, in August 1997 for use on reconstruction work.
	Castell Conwy/Conway Castle	4wDM	1958	F.C. Hibberd	This 180 hp Gardner 6LXB diesel-engined locomotive was built for RNAD Ernesettle, Plymouth. Bought by the Ffestiniog Railway in 1981 and re-gauged, it was re-bodied and overhauled at Boston Lodge in 1986 and frequently used on 'pull and push' trains. After several years on light duties a new engine was fitted in October 1999. Transferred to Dinas, in April 2000 for use as a stand-by on passenger engine. Used also on civil engineering rosters.
	Castell Cidwm, originally No 9	0-6-0DM	1953	Baguley	Purchased in summer 2009 for use on works trains from a private buyer. The locomotive has a Gardner 8LW diesel engine de-rated to 132 hp. Built by Baguley as a 2 ft gauge locomotive with the builders number 2395. It was built for the Drewry Car Co, for Underhill Day & Co, for the South Johnstone Co-operative Sugar Milling Association in Australia. The mill gave it the number 9 and used it to work sugar cane wagons in Innisfail district of Far North Queensland. In 2004 the locomotive was purchased by a member of the Lynton & Barnstaple Trust, who shipped it from Australia in 2005. It is believed to have been stored in Essex and in Somerset before being moved to the Exmoor Steam Railway. The locomotive will be overhauled and re-gauged before entering service.
	Bill, Hunslet 9248	0-4-0DH	1985	Hunslet	Arrived on the WHR 18 February 2010. A 2 ft 6 in (762 mm) gauge four-wheel 115 hp Ford-engined diesel hydraulic 15-ton flameproofed 4wDH locomotive previously used at the Corus Coated Products Division plant at Shotton, to be regauged for use on the WHR as a heavy shunter on the Boston Lodge and Dinas yards.
	Ben, Hunslet 9262	0-4-0DH	1985	Hunslet	Arrived on the WHR 18 February 2010. Almost identical to Bill.
	Dolgarrog	4wDM	1962	Simplex	A small Simplex locomotive loaned to the WHR by Innogy that has been used on construction trains, particularly on the Phase 4 section between Rhyd Ddu and Porthmadog.

== Ffestiniog Railway locomotives used on the WHR ==
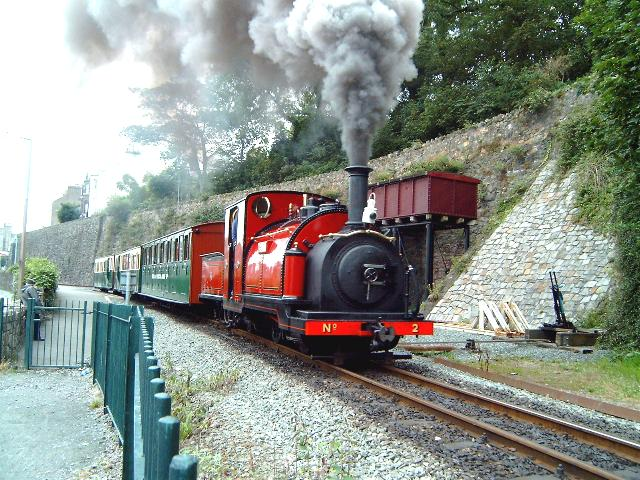
Prince departing Caernarfon

The following locomotives are normally Ffestiniog Railway stock that have run on the WHR. Some have transferred for regular service, or to cover for maintenance and traction requirements before there were enough dedicated WHR locomotives to operate the passenger service, others were for construction purposes only. With the FR-WHR link now open, FR locos visit fairly regularly on special services.

- Harold.
- The Colonel
- Upnor Castle - Construction loco, used on phase 2, 3 and 4.
- Mountaineer - used in 1997 and 2000-1
- Palmerston - visited in 2010 for photo-charter
- Blanche - used in 1999
- Conway Castle / Castell Conwy - Used on construction of phase 2 and still occasionally used for construction work. Yard shunter at Dinas, spare passenger diesel.
- Prince
- Taliesin (single Fairlie locomotive) - visited in 2009 for a photo-charter
- Lilla
- Linda
- Vale of Ffestiniog
- Merddin Emrys (double Fairlie locomotive) - visited in 2009 for a photo-charter
- Lyd (Lynton and Barnstaple Railway Manning Wardle 2-6-2T Replica - visited in 2010
- Earl of Merioneth (double Fairlie locomotive)
- David Lloyd George (double Fairlie locomotive)
- Britomart
- Moelwyn

== Line cars and self-propelled equipment ==
- Gullick Dobson tamper
- Stefcomatic tamper
- Matisa A05 tamper
- Plasser & Theurer KMX95 CM tamper

== Museum pieces ==
- Llanfair 0-4-0VBT built 1895 by De Winton for Penmaenmawr & Welsh Granite Co. Ltd. 3 ft (914 mm) gauge. Currently at Dinas awaiting tlc.

Another De Winton is on display in the entrance to the WHR Caernarfon Station.

== Coaches ==
The original source of information for this table was the: "Rheilffordd Eryri - Welsh Highland Railway Traveller's Guide" published by the Ffestiniog Railway Company in 2002. This has been supplemented by later information as it became available. Updated start of season 2020.

Number	Date built	Builder	Body Type	Seats	Notes
23	1894	Ashbury Carriage & Wagon Co	7 compartment	42	Built for the North Wales Narrow Gauge Railways became Welsh Highland Railway property in 1923 and was reduced in height to fit the FR loading gauge. Became Ffestiniog Railway property (in exchange for three bogie wagons) in 1926. Prior to this exchange, this carriage had been WHR No 24. Subsequent to the exchange, the number "24" was allocated to Ashbury "Corridor" No. 23, re-establishing the division between FR and WHR stock in the combined stock list. No 23 returned to FR service in 1955 and full doors fitted in 1966. Refurbished in 2002 and returned to the WHR.
24	2002	FR Boston Lodge Works	7 compartment	42	A replica of an 1894 "Ashbury" NWNGR "Summer Coach".
116	1972	Edmund Crow & FR Boston Lodge Works	'Enhanced' 3 saloon	36	Arrived for the 2011 season.
122	2001	FR Boston Lodge Works	3 saloon	36	Arrived for the 2011 season.
1001	1957	D Wickham & Co	Works Mess/Passenger Brake		Ex-Chattenden and Upnor Railway coach acquired for the WHR from the South Tynedale Railway and regauged from 2 ft 6in gauge. Currently used as a mess coach on construction trains and as a reserve passenger brake vehicle.
2010	2007/8	FR Boston Lodge Works	Kitchen/Toilet/Guard	0	A dedicated carriage containing toilet, guard's office and buffet store, similar to Carriage 124 on the Ffestiniog Railway. Transferred to Dinas by road early September 2008.
2011	1997/2011	Winson Engineering/FR Boston Lodge Works	Kitchen/Toilet/Guard	0	Similar to Carriage 2010.The first coach built for the Caernarfon service, delivered to Boston Lodge for trials on the FR and transferred to Dinas in September 1997 as semi-open saloon 2020. Converted into current form because of a need of a twin to 2010 and in need of overhaul.
2021	2002	Alan Keef	semi-open saloon	36	
2022	2002	Alan Keef	semi-open saloon	36	
2040	1997	Winson Engineering	saloon	36	Fully upholstered, heated and double glazed coach delivered to Dinas in September 1997 for the start of the Caernarfon service.
2042	1997	Winson Engineering	saloon	36	Fully upholstered, heated and double glazed coach delivered to Dinas in September 1997 for the start of the Caernarfon service.
2043	2007	FR Boston Lodge Works	saloon	35	A development of the Winson Engineering carriages delivered in 1997, including wider door opening for easier access to passengers with reduced mobility.
2044	2007	FR Boston Lodge Works	saloon	35	A development of the Winson Engineering carriages delivered in 1997, including wider door opening for easier access to passengers with reduced mobility.
2045	2007	FR Boston Lodge Works	saloon	35	A development of the Winson Engineering carriages delivered in 1997, including wider door opening for easier access to passengers with reduced mobility.
2046	2014	FR Boston Lodge Works	Saloon	35	A development of carriages 2043, 2044 and 2045. Built at Boston Lodge. Funded by WHR Society
2047	2017	FR Boston Lodge Works	Saloon	35	A development of carriages 2043, 2044 and 2045. Built at Boston Lodge. Funded by WHR Society
2048	Under Construction	FR Boston Lodge Works	Saloon	35	A development of carriages 2043, 2044 and 2045. Under construction at Boston Lodge. Funded by a private donor.
2060	2007/2008 (Rebuilt)	Romanian Co & FR Boston Lodge Works	Saloon	36	Supplied as an externally complete shell on regauged bogies to Boston Lodge, where it was fitted out as a WHR all third saloon. Now in service.
2090	1997	Winson Engineering	guard/Lav/saloon	16	Fully upholstered, heated and double glazed coach with double doors for wheelchair access, sponsored by First Hydro and delivered to Dinas in September 1997 for the start of the Caernarfon service.
2091	1997/2017	FR Boston Lodge Works	Guard/Lav/Saloon	24	Similar to 2090. Converted from 2041, completed 2017. Work undertaken at Boston Lodge.
2100	2008/2009	FR Boston Lodge Works	Pullman observation saloon	26	Transferred to Dinas in March by rail using the CTRL. In 2010, the carriage was named 'Glaslyn' by Queen Elizabeth II at a ceremony at Dinas station.
2115	1998	Winson Engineering	Pullman saloon	20	Heated and double glazed. Fitted with Pullman style armchairs. Finished in U.K. Pullman Car Company livery. Originally sponsored by Historic Houses Hotels Ltd, the proprietors of Bodysgallen Hall, hence the name Bodysgallen.
2152	2017-2019	FR Boston Lodge Works	Pullman observation saloon	22	Similar to 2100, built at Boston Lodge. Funded by the WHR Society. Replacement for 2115 which is in need of an overhaul.
