= Welsh Highland Railway restoration =

The restoration of the Welsh Highland Railway has a colourful and complex history. This article provides the modern history.

== The background of the Welsh Highland Railway (WHR) ==
The Welsh Highland Railway (WHR) was a poorly-funded job creation scheme, conceived in the early 1920s, to complete the construction of a 22-mile narrow gauge railway route from Dinas, three miles from Carnarvon (now Caernarfon) to Portmadoc (now Porthmadog). An earlier scheme to achieve this – the Portmadoc Beddgelert and South Snowdon Railway (PB&SSR) – had been abandoned in 1905/6 after it ran out of money.

The Welsh Highland Railway (Light Railway) Company (WHLR Company) was created in 1922, by a light railway order (LRO) under the Light Railways Act 1896, and construction began that year. The work involved joining two pre-existing railways with a new section of track. The northern half of the WHR incorporated the North Wales Narrow Gauge Railways (NWGR), built in the 1870s, from Dinas to Rhyd Ddu, at the foot of Snowdon (9½ miles), together with its branch from Tryfan Junction to Bryngwyn (another three miles). The southern end of the route incorporated an upgraded three-mile section of the Croesor Tramway, built in the 1860s. Between Rhyd Ddu and Croesor Junction; some new construction on the link between these earlier railways had been carried out by the PB&SSR around Beddgelert in 1905/6, but these works lay unfinished.

The PB&SSR section of the route had originally been intended to use electric traction, and would have included very steep gradients (1 in 23 in places). However the WHR was to use steam traction; and, as steam locomotives could not cope with such steep gradients, only some of the unfinished PB&SSR formation could be incorporated into the WHR. As a result, new track had to be built, giving rise to the reverse curves above Beddgelert, which gave an even gradient of 1 in 40 (2.5%) over a slightly longer route. At its southern end, the WHR was linked to the Festiniog Railway (FR) at Portmadoc and the FR provided a new station (Portmadoc New) to serve both lines. FR locomotives and rolling stock became a familiar sight on the WHR with through workings.

Construction of the WHR was largely funded by the Ministry of Transport, the local authorities and the construction company McAlpine (which did the construction work). These made loans to the WHLR Company, of £70,000 in all, in the form of debentures. Thus the railway was in debt from the moment it opened. The railway was opened throughout in 1923; however this turned out to be the railway's best year; it declined, and went into receivership in 1927.

With various local government officers appointed as receiver, the WHR continued to operate, primarily as a tourist attraction, until the end of 1933, when the local authority debenture holders declared their intention to close it. This prompted the Festiniog Railway to take out a 42-year lease on the WHR from 1 July 1934, but the poor traffic declined further, and the FR ceased to operate the WHR after the 1936 season. Unfortunately for the FR, the lease made no provision for early termination; so, even though they were no longer operating the WHR, the FR were forced to continue paying the rent. It took until 1942 before a court terminated the lease, thus releasing the FR from its obligation. This legal decision followed the requisitioning of the WHR's track, locos and rolling stock in the Second World War scrap-metal drive.

Having managed to rid itself of the WHR lease, the Festiniog Railway continued to operate on a freight-only basis throughout the Second World War (having suspended its passenger service on the outbreak of war in 1939), but closed almost completely in August 1946.

== The legal status of the WHR trackbed ==
With little hope of reviving the WHR, a winding up order was made on 1 June 1944, at the instigation of Caernarvonshire County Council, and Mr Alwynne Thomas, a Llandudno accountant, was appointed as liquidator. One consequence of the winding up order was that any transfer of shares or debentures could not be validated, nor could new directors be appointed, without a court order. Over time the surviving WHLR directors died, and were not replaced.

The liquidator's task was to dispose of the WHLR Company's assets and distribute any monies raised among the creditors (i.e. the debenture holders), before winding the company up. By the time of his appointment the locomotives, rolling stock and most of the track had gone, and the company's principal asset was the now empty trackbed (or most of it, as the company had never actually owned the former Croesor Tramway section).

Peter Johnson, author of numerous WHR books, notes that "The debentures were not actually secured and, in 1923, the local authorities made the WHR agree to be party to a mortgage deed defining the terms of interest and principal repayment." This placed the debenture holders in a strong position. Following council boundary changes, the main debenture holders were the Department of Transport (some 42%), Carnarvonshire County Council (later Gwynedd CC) 17.7%, Merioneth District Council 3.5%, Dwyfor District Council 13%, McAlpines 11.8%, Branch Nominees Ltd 11.7% with 0.1% thought untraceable through a Mrs Conbran/Sir John Stewart.

Of the shares in the 1922 company, some 88.4% were known to have been held by H.J. Jack and passed to his successors.

The liquidator (and later, the official receiver) was mostly interested in obtaining the best deal for the debenture holders, who had funded the railway's construction and were owed a substantial sum of money. Thus at first, he was likely to sell the trackbed to the highest bidder.

However, due to the continued existence of the 1922 light railway order, disposal of the trackbed was not an easy matter. For a start, the LRO gave its holder legal entitlement to own the trackbed, and since the LRO was made out to the WHLR Company, it meant that the WHLR Company legally owned the trackbed. Secondly, although the liquidator could, and did, sell off some land (notably at Dinas and Rhyd Ddu), the trackbed's statutory status prevented him from disposing of any land, or asset, that could inhibit any future re-opening of the railway. This meant that the trackbed had to be kept in one piece and could only be used for railway purposes. On the other hand, over time, the trackbed became subject to a number of claims for adverse possession (an example being the station building at Snowdon Ranger). But the LRO's remaining powers prevented these claims from gaining traction since there is a legal question mark over the validity of such claims over part of a statutory undertaking.

All this meant that the trackbed could only be sold through one of two alternative legal processes:

- Abandonment order – The liquidator could apply for an abandonment order. If granted, this would extinguish the LRO and then allow the trackbed to be sold off in parcels, like any other piece of land, to any purchaser. It could then be used for any purpose (subject to any required planning permission). However, applying for an abandonment order would incur legal costs. The liquidator had no separate funds with which to obtain such an order, nor did the WHLR Company hold any money to fund one. Thus the cost would have to be met up front by the share/debenture holders, or any prospective purchaser. Once the sale was complete, the purchaser would then have to obtain a new LRO if they wished to re-open the railway. However, the time elapsed between the making of the abandonment order and the making of any new powers to rebuild would be a window of opportunity for claims for adverse possession to gain validity. If such a claim was successful, any new powers to rebuild the railway would likely need to include powers of compulsory purchase to re-acquire it.
- Amending order – Alternatively, any prospective purchaser could apply (and pay) for an amending order under section 24 of the Light Railways Act 1896, to transfer the LRO from the WHLR Company to them. If successful, they, in turn, would become exclusively legally entitled to own the trackbed and could then purchase it, in its entirety, from the OR. This process would preserve the remaining powers of the LRO and would mean that the land could only be used for railway purposes thereafter. It would protect the trackbed from claims of adverse possession until the LRO could be superseded by new powers. If the purchaser subsequently decided not to reopen the railway, they would then have to obtain an abandonment order before they could do anything else with it.

With either method, however, the new owner of the trackbed would still have to apply for new powers, if they wanted to rebuild the railway. This was because not all of the LRO's powers remained intact. The WHLR Company's failure to reinstate and re-open the railway over such a long period of time meant that those parts of the LRO which related to the actual construction and operation of the railway had effectively been abandoned. Thus the remaining powers only served to protect the trackbed from redevelopment.

At the time, the use of an amending order to transfer a light railway order was not properly understood by any of the interested parties (nor their legal advisors), nor would it be until 1991.

Thus for many years, the only known means of transferring the trackbed lay in the liquidator (or later, the official receiver) first obtaining an abandonment order before any sale could go through. The share/debenture holders were reluctant to provide any funds to the liquidator or the official receiver, and thus the cost of obtaining an abandonment order would have to be borne by the prospective purchaser. In fact, the OR later made it a condition of sale, which delayed the winding up of the WHLR Company until 2003.

== Welsh Highland Light Railway (1964) Limited ==
Soon after the WHR's closure, proposals were made to adapt the trackbed as a long-distance footpath. In the railway press some letter writers suggested that it should be preserved, but nothing came of either idea.

=== Reviving the Festiniog Railway ===
In 1951 the Festiniog Railway Society was formed, with the aim of saving and re-opening the closed but still intact Festiniog Railway. In the early days, the FR Society looked at acquiring the WHLR Company as a way to take over the FR. However the idea was dropped, due to the complicated legal status of the WHR.

=== The first WHR Society ===
In July 1961, a meeting was held at Shrewsbury railway station, to discuss the possibility of reopening the WHR. The meeting had been called by Bob Honychurch, a Shrewsbury businessman. Honychurch had been a volunteer on the Festiniog Railway and had been considering the possibility of re-opening the WHR, along with other FR volunteers (Bob Brown, Richard Hilton and Laurence Brydon) alongside their continued involvement with the FR. Honychurch had been in correspondence with the liquidator (Alwynne Thomas) for some time, and Thomas attended the meeting, where he stated that he was prepared to sell the WHR trackbed for £750, subject to terms which would have to be negotiated. It was agreed that a new group, to be known as The Welsh Highland Railway Society, should be created and an ad hoc committee was formed. A general meeting was held in October 1961 at Crewe railway station, where the society board was formally elected, with Bob Brown as chairman and Bob Honychurch as secretary. The aim of the WHR Society was to restore all or part of the railway.

Given that some (not all) of the founders had previously been involved with the Festiniog Railway, there was a mixed reaction to the formation of the WHR Society among FR supporters. While some welcomed the move, others were openly hostile. It is thought that the FR's general manager, Allan Garraway, was particularly hostile.

In order to begin the restoration of the line, the WHR Society (or any other organisation so interested) needed to gain access to the track bed. Negotiations were started with the liquidator to buy the trackbed, and with the local authorities to obtain planning permission. There seems to have been no mention either of an abandonment, or an amending order, but any sale would have been unlawful without one. The liquidator seems to have responded well to the society and soon came to accept it as a viable would-be purchaser. He even gave them permission to enter on to the trackbed around Beddgelert, to begin clearance work while negotiations continued. Merionethshire County Council gave planning permission for the southern end of the route, but Caernarvonshire County Council proved particularly obstructive to the WHR's revival. During the early years, negotiations were sometimes hampered by other interests: a couple of parties wishing to build miniature railways on the trackbed; cycling and walking charities (who wished to open up the trackbed as a footpath/cycleway); and Caernarvonshire County Council's own surveyors (who listed some fifteen points where road improvements would affect the railway). Peter Johnson notes: "There might have been a window where the county council could have got an abandonment order using the Transport Act 1962 in the 1960s; the cost would have been less than £5,000, probably quite a lot less. On reflection, I suspect that its problem was that it could not really demonstrate that acquiring 'all' of the trackbed was within its statutory purposes and justify any expenditure on it. If it was determined, it could have done it."

=== "The '64 Company" ===
Advised that it needed a corporate identity to take on the railway's responsibilities, in early 1964 the WHR Society formed a limited company. With the permission of the liquidator, they called the new company "Welsh Highland Light Railway (1964) Limited", and Bill Brown became its first chairman. The WHLR (1964) Ltd was organised on democratic lines – limited by guarantee – and was owned by its members. It became known colloquially as "The 64 Co", a term still used by some, despite a change of name to Welsh Highland Railway Ltd in 1996.

Negotiations with the liquidator proved to be somewhat slow, mainly due to delays caused by the liquidator's ill health. During the negotiations, a price (£750) and contract had been agreed. However, just as a deal seemed close, the liquidator died and the papers passed to the Official Receiver (OR) in London. At first, it was thought that the OR might appoint a new liquidator, but as time passed the OR decided to take on that role himself. The OR did not go through with the sale to WHLR (1964) Ltd and instead decided to auction the trackbed to the highest bidder in 1967. Lacking access to the trackbed, the WHLR (1964) Ltd established a depot on former railway property at Kinnerley in Shropshire. Rolling stock and equipment was collected there with a view to moving on to the WHR trackbed when access could be secured.

In auctioning the trackbed, the OR demanded that any purchaser should be able to demonstrate that they had the resources to take on the WHR's liabilities, and also that they agree to fund the abandonment order, which would be necessary before the trackbed could be sold. The first of these demands may have been an attempt to ensure that the trackbed did not drop back onto his desk after any sale, from another bankruptcy.

WHLR (1964) Ltd put in a bid for the trackbed, but were outbid by a Mr JR Green. Green was a benefactor of the Ravenglass and Eskdale Railway in Cumbria and was reputed to be a millionaire. Consequently, Green became the OR's preferred bidder. When this became apparent, Green approached WHLR (1964) Ltd asking them to become a support group for the restoration and operation of the railway. Believing that they would no longer be able to acquire the trackbed in their own right, they agreed. However, Green then encountered financial difficulties. Although these were subsequently resolved, they were sufficient to dent the OR's confidence in him as the preferred bidder. As a result, the OR did not go through with the sale, and Green dropped out of the bidding for the trackbed by the end of February 1969. WHLR (1964) Ltd then revived their own attempt to acquire the trackbed.

=== Beddgelert Siding and Gelert's Farm ===
Having failed to obtain access to the WHR trackbed, in late 1973 WHLR (1964) Ltd purchased from British Rail the "Beddgelert Siding" site in Porthmadog. This was the trackbed of a former standard-gauge spur from the Cambrian Railways which was originally intended as the start of a standard-gauge railway to Beddgelert which did not go ahead. Instead, the spur had become an interchange point between the Cambrian Railways and the Croesor Tramway (later part of the WHR). At around the same time as it acquired the Beddgelert siding, in a separate transaction, WHLR (1964) Ltd purchased Gelert's Farm, which lay inside the triangle formed by Beddgelert siding, the Cambrian Coast Line and the trackbed of the WHR. In a third transaction, WHLR (1964) Ltd purchased from British Rail a piece of land in the corner of the Gelert's Farm site, which included a short (about 90 feet) section of the WHR trackbed immediately north of the Cambrian crossing.

=== North or South ===
In 1974 local government was reorganised, and Caernarvonshire and Merionethshire county councils were replaced by the new Gwynedd County Council (GCC). After a while, GCC came to adopt a less obstructive stance towards the restoration of the WHR than their predecessors. Falling visitor numbers had prompted them to seek another tourist attraction in the area, and the idea of restoring the northern half of the WHR began to take root. GCC approached WHLR (1964) Ltd, in 1975, with a proposal that they relocate from the Porthmadog area, with the prospect of eventually building a new railway between Caernarfon and Rhyd Ddu. This would entail using the by now empty (and GCC owned) trackbed of the former standard gauge Caernarfon to Afon Wen line, between Dinas and Caernarfon. WHLR (1964) Ltd members voted to agree to this move at an extraordinary general meeting in 1976, but before any move could take place, GCC changed its mind and began to favour the idea of restoring the southern end of the WHR instead.

So WHLR (1964) Ltd stayed put in Porthmadog. By 1980 it had established a depot and workshops at Gelert's Farm and built a short length of line from a station at Porthmadog (WHHR), running along the course of the Beddgelert siding to Pen y Mount (about 1 mile). At Pen y Mount, the new line came alongside the original WHR (formerly Croesor Tramway) trackbed. WHLR (1964) Ltd's intention was to extend the railway northwards up the WHR trackbed, towards Beddgelert, once they had gained access and negotiations with the official receiver and GCC continued. The line was inspected by Major Olver of the Department of Transport, and opened for tourist passenger service on 2 August 1980, trading as "The Welsh Highland Railway".

=== Russell ===
In 1987, WHLR (1964) Ltd completed the restoration of the only surviving steam locomotive owned by the original line. Hunslet 2-6-2T Russell had been built in 1906 to the order of the Portmadoc, Beddgelert & South Snowdon Railway. But it was delivered to the North Wales Narrow Gauge Railways, where it was put into service. When the PB&SSR scheme failed, Russell remained in service on the NWNGR, until it became part of the WHR. This engine's complex history has been the subject of several books, and its survival and return to Wales have made it one of the more famous narrow gauge locomotives in the UK. Russell is thought to have been the inspiration behind "Ivor the Engine" and also appears in the Thomas the Tank Engine series as "Fearless Freddie". Russell was rescued for preservation by the Birmingham Locomotive Club in 1955 and was displayed at the Talyllyn Railway before being donated to WHLR (1964) Ltd in 1965.

WHLR (1964) Ltd changed its company name to "Welsh Highland Railway Ltd" (WHRL) in 1996. In the same year they successfully registered the name "Welsh Highland Railway" as a trademark.

== Controversy and complication ==
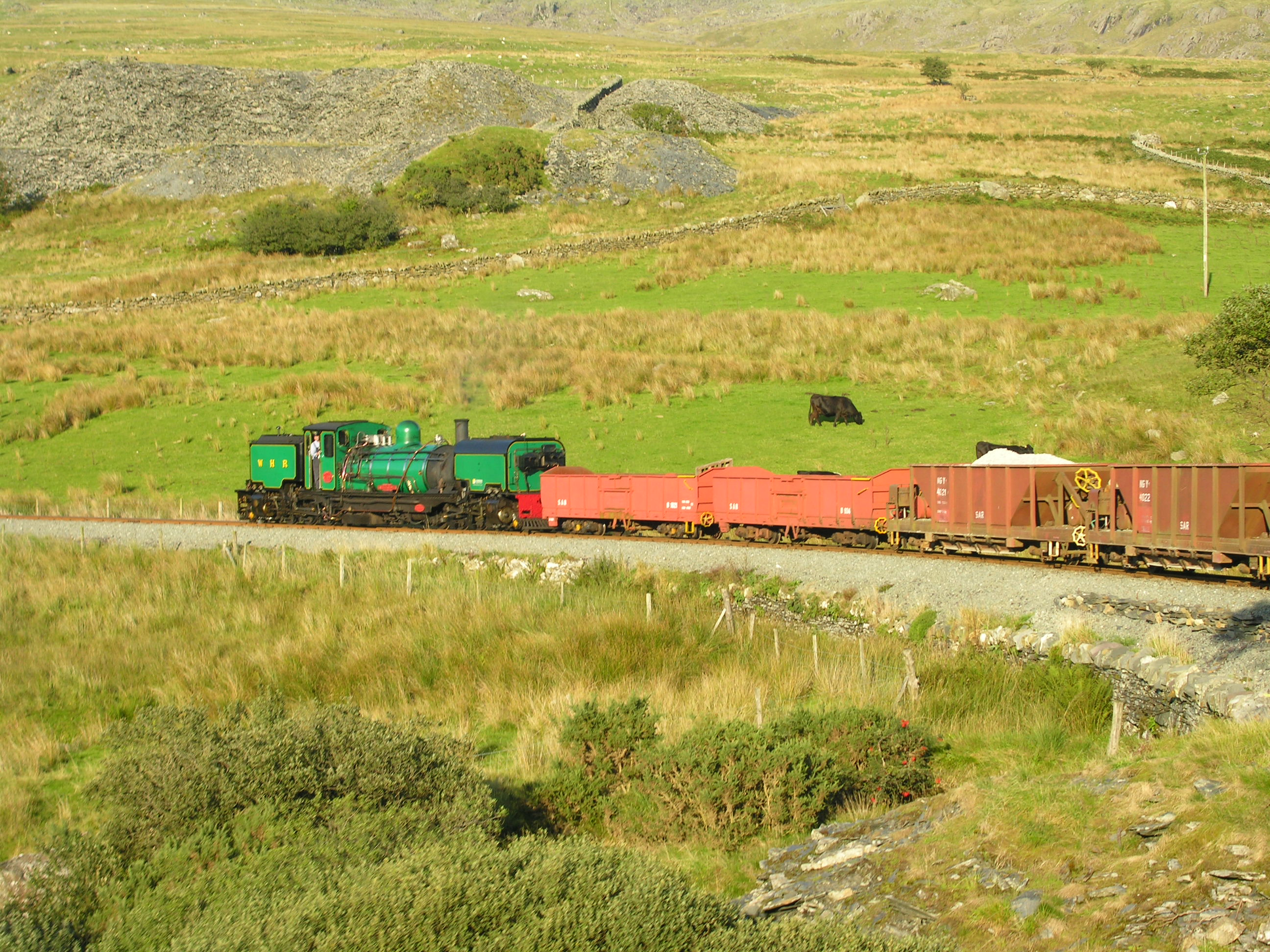
SAR NGG 16 Class Garratt 138 'Mileniwm'/'Millennium' hauls a mixed goods and passenger train away from Rhyd Ddu during the 2006 'Superpower' weekend.

The experience with Mr J.R. Green in 1967–1969 had raised the prospect of the trackbed being sold, only to drop back into the OR's lap through another bankruptcy. So when, in the mid-1970s, Gwynedd County Council (successor to Caernarfonshire County Council from 1974) began to take an interest in acquiring the trackbed, they quickly became the OR's preferred bidder – since local authorities are unable to go bankrupt.

In addition to being a debenture holder, GCC claimed it had run up costs maintaining the railway's structures since the railway closed. Consequently, a deal began to emerge whereby the money GCC was owed by the WHLR Company would be offset against the perceived value of the trackbed, and thus GCC would acquire the trackbed for only a nominal sum. As this would mean the OR would no longer be selling to the highest bidder the OR would need to get a court ruling, which would overrule any objections from other debenture holders and authorise him to go through with the sale.

However it was discovered later that the council had in 1934 agreed to adopt the structures (bridges) and pay for maintenance itself; this was recorded in signed minutes. On the restored railway, two or three overbridges have been rebuilt by the county council on this basis - the county council had adopted the bridges and it was not for the WHR company (old or new) to pay for their upkeep (or renewal). Therefore, their claim to the OR for these costs was out of order. Had the OR known this at the time, it might have been possible to persuade the OR to sell the trackbed to a party other than the county council.

In the early 1980s, WHLR (1964) Ltd and GCC began a project to gain joint control of the trackbed and to begin rebuilding the railway in stages. The scheme involved GCC receiving ownership for a nominal sum (£1) and then leasing parts of it back to WHLR (1964) Ltd. Various plans were put together and various starting points were discussed. Eventually they settled on rebuilding the WHR from Porthmadog to "a convenient point between Beddgelert and Rhyd Ddu".

It was the stated intention of GCC to comply with the OR's requirement that they fund an abandonment order. But within WHLR (1964) Ltd, there were some who began to have concerns that once the statutory protection the trackbed enjoyed had gone, the council might then decide to use the parts not leased to the '64 Co. for non-railway purposes, such as the much talked-about footpaths or road improvement/bypass schemes. An example was a road improvement scheme at Waunfawr, which was proposed to sever the trackbed, with any prospective restorer of the line having to pay for a bridge. (This scheme and many of the others mooted never came to pass.)

Another issue of concern was that claims for adverse possession ("squatters' rights") of the land (which would have been numerous) would have gained more validity (and become practically impossible to fight) had an abandonment order been made.

== Trackbed Consolidation Ltd ==
=== Financial reconstruction ===
The risk that GCC might not open all of the track bed for railway restoration (and that a substantial amount of it could therefore be lost to footpaths, adverse possession, or road schemes) led a small group of WHLR (1964) Ltd members to lose confidence in the proposed partnership with GCC. They began to consider other methods for gaining access to the trackbed with a view to reopening the whole railway. This small "whole railway" faction included two serving WHLR (1964) Ltd directors (Cedric Lodge and John Ewing) and one former director (Ernie Preston). They came up with the idea (suggested by transport historian Stuart Rankin to Ernie Preston, during their daily commute to work in York and also mentioned in a side remark by an assistant at the OR) that they might obtain control of the trackbed by acquiring a controlling share of the equity in the original WHLR Company of 1922 to effect a takeover, then seeking to lift it out of receivership. They also thought that the railway could then be rebuilt under the powers of the original 1922 Light Railway Order (LRO), without the need to obtain new powers.

With the benefit of hindsight, it is now known that this whole strategy was flawed from the outset. For one thing, the Companies Act prevents the transfer of shares/debentures, or the appointment of new directors, once a company becomes subject to a winding-up order – unless ordered by the Court.

Furthermore, the specific powers contained within the 1922 LRO for the actual construction and operation of the railway, had effectively been abandoned – even though no formal abandonment order had been made. Thus new powers would have to be sought by anybody wishing to reopen the WHR.

In effect, the only benefit of the LRO remaining in place was that it preserved the integrity of the trackbed as a "statutory undertaking" – ensuring that it could only be used for railway purposes, protecting it from claims of "adverse possession" and preventing it from being broken up and sold piecemeal.

However, all this was not understood at the time and it would take a High Court ruling in 1991 to settle the matter.

=== Statement of intent ===
Initially, acting without the knowledge the rest of the WHLR (1964) Ltd board and using their own funds, the "whole railway faction" began to purchase shares and debentures in the 1922 company. Then, in the first quarter of 1983 they revealed their actions and proposals to the rest of the WHLR (1964) Ltd board, by circulating a "statement of intent". The document caused consternation among the remaining members of the board, as it appeared to go against the board's accepted policy of pursuing a deal with GCC. This led to a stormy board meeting on 16 April 1983, at which it was agreed to set up a trust, which would hold the shares and debentures already acquired. The whole railway faction were authorised to continue investigating the financial reconstruction of the 1922 company, to firm up their proposals – reporting back to the board at regular intervals. However any change of direction away from the proposed partnership with GCC would have to be decided by the board as a whole. At the same time the WHLR (1964) Ltd continued to negotiate with GCC and on 19 April, the council's Light Railway Sub-Committee resolved to recommend that the council should lease the Pen-y-Mount to Pont Croesor section of the trackbed to WHLR (1964) Ltd after they had acquired it from the OR.

Having been only been given permission to "investigate" the financial reconstruction of the 1922 company, the whole railway faction went further and attempted to raise funds by issuing a prospectus, which they circulated among WHLR (1964) Ltd members and members of the general public. This was done without the permission of the WHLR (1964) Ltd board and led to another stormy board meeting, held in Denton, Manchester on 17 September. The board was concerned that the whole railway faction was going beyond their original authority and were acting contrary to the laid down policy of the company. The whole railway faction were asked to hand over their shares and debentures to the company free of charge. Believing that if they did so, the board would do nothing with them, the whole railway faction refused. Consequently, those who were WHLR (1964) Ltd directors were invited to resign from the board, which they did.

=== The EGM ===
In the meantime the WHLR (1964) Ltd board called an extraordinary general meeting for members to vote on the proposed terms of the lease on the Pen-y-Mount to Pont Croesor trackbed and also the alternatives to the deal with the council – including financial reconstruction of the 1922 company. The EGM was held on 12 November 1983. The board recommended that the company pursue its proposed partnership with GCC and the membership voted by a substantial majority to do so. Later, there would be claims that WHLR (1964) Ltd chairman, Ken Dicks, did not allow proper discussion of the financial reconstruction option.

=== Kembraive ===
Before the EGM however, and unbeknownst to the WHLR (1964) Ltd board, the whole railway faction continued to push forward their own agenda. The whole railway faction purchased (for £200) a shell company through a specialist company (Pennine Company Formations of Harrogate). Pennine set up new shell companies and then sold them on to those who wanted a quick and easy way of forming a new company. It is far quicker to change the objects, directors and capital of a pre-existing company than to set one up from scratch, and this is standard practice in business. Kembraive was originally set up on 26 April 1983, and the memorandum Pennine chose to create for this particular shell company empowered it to purchase and sell clothing and household goods. Between that date and October the whole railway faction bought the shell company from Pennine, and on 27/28 October – after the whole railway faction directors had resigned from the WHLR (1964) Ltd board and fifteen days before the WHLR (1964) Ltd EGM – Kembraive changed its objects to include the purchase of railway trackbeds. It also voted to change its name to Trackbed Consolidation Ltd (TCL). The change of name became effective on 25 November. At this time, its directors included those involved with whole railway faction of the WHLR (1964) Ltd. The directors are quoted as saying they liked the word play of the chosen name, even if no one else noticed.

=== Suspension ===
On 19 November (seven days after the EGM) TCL wrote to the official receiver, stating their intention to attempt a financial reconstruction of the 1922 WHLR Company and offering to purchase the trackbed directly from the OR for £10,000, if the attempt failed. The OR reported this to WHLR (1964) Ltd and it was discussed at a WHLR (1964) Ltd board meeting on 12 December 1983. Further investigation led to the discovery that TCL was, in fact, a front company for the whole railway faction, and at a WHLR (1964) Ltd board meeting held on 5 May 1984, it was resolved that the five WHLR (1964) Ltd members identified as being involved with TCL should have their memberships suspended for acting contrary to the wellbeing of the company.

One factor behind this decision may have been that some of the TCL directors, whilst pursuing their own independent agenda, had also put themselves up for election to the WHLR (1964) Ltd board at the forthcoming AGM. Members who were suspended would not be allowed to attend the meeting and thus could not be elected to the board. But the letters informing those concerned of their suspension arrived too late to prevent at least one of them from travelling to Wales to attend. They were refused entry to the meeting and there was an altercation. These events led to bitter animosity between the two sides, which would have serious repercussions for WHLR (1964) Ltd in later years.

TCL was, after much detective work, able to trace and purchase a great deal of the share capital and debentures of the original company. A vote in favour by the holders of 75% of debentures was a legal requirement to allow a scheme of financial reconstruction of the 1922 company to be agreed.

=== Creditors' meeting ===
In February 1984, the OR wrote to TCL, informing them that he had decided to sell the WHR trackbed to GCC and that he would go to the High Court to ask for leave to do so. TCL responded by initiating a formal creditors' meeting, in order to attempt their proposed financial reconstruction of the WHLR Company. The effect of this was to prevent the OR from going to the High Court until the outcome was known. An initial creditors' meeting was held on 23 July 1984, but was adjourned, when the Department of Transport announced it would sell its debentures (some 42% of the total) to the highest bidder. These were purchased in January 1985 by the West Consortium (WestCo) – a separate small group of WHLR (1964) Ltd members, with similar views to TCL.

=== Stephen Wiggs ===
Meanwhile, in April 1985, solicitor (and WHLR (1964) Ltd member) Stephen Wiggs wrote to the WHLR (1964) Ltd Journal stating the TCL assumption that the 1922 light railway order could be used to rebuild the WHR was almost certainly wrong.

Wiggs asserted that the powers to operate the railway had effectively been abandoned and could not be re-used in the future, even though an abandonment order had not been obtained. Effectively the continued existence of the LRO only served to protect the integrity of the empty trackbed and anybody wishing to rebuild the WHR – even the original WHLR Company – would have to obtain new powers to do so.

Stephen Wiggs' warning went largely unheard by TCL, but Wiggs was ultimately proved to be right.

=== Creditors' meeting resumed ===
With 65% of the debentures secured by TCL and their new allies WestCo, all seemed set for a TCL 'victory' at the reconvened creditors' meeting in January 1986. However the remaining debentures were owned by three local councils. One of them (Dwyfor) changed its mind at the last minute, and voted with others, including GCC, to block the move, so the required 75% majority was not achieved. Had the 75% been reached (Dwyfor's vote would have taken the majority to 78%) the next stage would have been for TCL to go to the Companies Court to ask for the WHLR company to be taken out of liquidation. If this had been successful, then it was TCL's stated intention to offer to lease successive sections to WHLR (1964) Ltd. It was believed that GCC leant on Dwyfor prior to the meeting.

However, as noted above the whole idea of financial reconstruction was fatally flawed, because the lack of any living WHLR Company directors meant that there was nobody who could amend the company's share register to validate the share/debenture transfers to TCL/WestCo – even if the court was to order it.

Consequently, TCL/WestCo had no legal standing to instruct the WHLR Company board to call a shareholders meeting, where a new board could be elected – indeed there was no board to instruct. Thus, there could be no takeover. Without a takeover, TCL/WestCo had no legal standing to act on behalf of the WHLR Company and thus, financial reconstruction was impossible. However, it was a moot point which would eventually be settled at the High Court. For the time being, having failed to gain the required 75% majority and with little or no prospect of being able to persuade the three local authorities to sell any of their debentures, TCL and WestCo had little choice but to suspend their attempt at financial reconstruction. This would then allow the OR to continue in his intention of applying to the High Court for permission to sell the assets of the WHLR Company to GCC.

== Involvement of the Ffestiniog Railway ==
=== Background ===
The Ffestiniog Railway had, in 1982, completed the full restoration of its line from Porthmadog to Blaenau Ffestiniog (begun in 1954) at considerable expense. Part of the restoration had involved the construction of a considerable "deviation" (nearly three miles of new track) using volunteer labour, where parts of the old line had been flooded as part of a hydroelectric pumped-storage power station scheme. In the process the FR had incurred debts. By the mid-1980s, the FR was also suffering a fall in passenger numbers.

==== Credible threat ====
In 1987, the Festiniog Railway Company's General Manager, David Pollock, was approached by his signal and telegraph manager Bob MacGregor, who was also a WHLR (1964) Ltd member and also a member of TCL. MacGregor told him that it now looked likely that the WHR trackbed would be sold to Gwynedd County Council (for £1) and that a partnership with the WHR (1964) Ltd was being put together. McGregor was concerned about this, and, after hearing similar concerns from others of the same view, Mr Pollock was moved to act, and reported the matter to the FR Company board, headed by Chairman John Routly who had, by then, succeeded Alan Pegler.

The FR employs around sixty full-time staff and is one of the larger employers in the area. A potential competitor, on the FR's doorstep, backed financially by the county council, was viewed as a credible threat to the profitability of the FR – even more so because Beddgelert was believed to offer a more attractive destination to tourists staying in the Porthmadog area than Blaenau Ffestiniog. Even worse was the possibility that a rebuilt WHR to Beddgelert could be operated more cheaply, and so could charge a lower fare than the FR. The FR estimated that such a railway might draw away between 45% and 60% of its traffic, threatening its ability to employ its staff and its ability to repay the debt the FR had incurred in the final push of the Blaenau extension.

==== The secret bid ====
The FR decided that the best way to counter this threat was for the FR themselves to acquire the WHR trackbed, in order to prevent the WHR from being rebuilt. This later became known as the "buy to shut" policy (though more accurately it would be "buy to keep shut"). In September or October 1987 a secret bid of £16,000, far exceeding any other standing bid, was made anonymously to the OR, through solicitors, and the FR started to lobby to protect its position. It did not take long for news of this anonymous bid to become known, but the identity of the secret bidder would remain a mystery until 1990.

However the secret bid was not successful. In the 1970s the OR had been preparing to sell the trackbed to J.R. Green, reputed to be a millionaire. But before the sale could be completed, Green experienced financial difficulties and the sale fell through. That episode presented to the OR the prospect of selling the WHR trackbed, only for it to land back on his desk from another bankruptcy. It seems the OR had set his mind to selling to GCC, as this offered the best prospect of clearing the WHR from his desk for good.

By summer 1988, it had become apparent that the FR's secret bid stood little chance of being accepted as long as GCC remained in the equation.

The FR, therefore, contacted GCC in September 1988 (12 months after submitting their secret bid) to ask for a meeting, but refusing to divulge what they wanted to talk about beforehand. The County Treasurer reported this meeting in a memo dated 21 September 1988. (This was later revealed in leaked documents at the first Public Inquiry.) The FR's intention at this meeting seems to have been to persuade GCC to drop out of the bidding for the trackbed (leaving the FR's secret bid with a better chance of being accepted) or if this failed, to persuade GCC (if they did acquire the trackbed) to use it for other than railway purposes. The FR even offered to give the trackbed to GCC (assuming its bid was successful) with caveats that they should not use it for railway purposes. The meeting was backed up by correspondence between David Pollock and the County Solicitor and Secretary in November/December 1988, in which Pollock asked for the matter to be kept strictly confidential and specifically that WHLR (1964) Ltd should not be informed.

GCC appear not to have accepted the FR's approach, although they did at least keep it confidential for the time being. On 6 November 1989 GCC reiterated its partnership with WHLR (1964) Ltd, signalling that it was ready to go ahead with the planned purchase of the trackbed from the OR for £1 and was ready to go to the High Court with the OR, to sanction the sale.

At around this time, it is likely that the OR contacted the solicitors representing the FR, requiring to know the identity of the secret bidder, as he would need to declare all the interested parties at the forthcoming High Court hearing. In order to continue an interest in the WHR, the FR realised it would have to reveal its identity. First, though, the FR asked for another meeting with GCC and this took place on 21 December.

At this meeting GCC produced a study which concluded that there was in fact room for two tourist railways in Porthmadog; and they said they were keen to facilitate this. At this point the FR presented a complete about-face from the position they had taken over a year earlier. The FR informed the council that they were "in the business of Railway conservation and do not wish to close any railway capable of viable development" (The WHR was of course already closed.) This apparent shift in the policies of the FR may have been helped by a number of directors and officers who pushed for, and eventually financed, a greater involvement in the restoration of the WHR. There are some doubts as to whether this apparent about-face was a truly sincere one at this time, or whether they were merely trying to break up the partnership between GCC and the WHLR (1964) Ltd – on the principle of "divide and rule". The FR still sought to acquire the trackbed, but now they claimed they wanted to lease the trackbed to the WHLR (1964) Ltd, in the same way GCC were proposing to do. As a result, GCC urged the FR to speak to WHLR (1964) Ltd.

Over Christmas 1989, David Pollock contacted the chairman of WHLR (1964) Ltd, Ken Dicks, asking him for a meeting, which was held on 5 January 1990. Pollock revealed the FR's identity as the secret bidder and set out the FR's policy as set out to GCC on 21 December, offering to become the WHLR (1964) Ltd's landlord instead of GCC. WHLR (1964) Ltd had, by this time, obtained planning permission to rebuild the WHR from Pen-y-Mount to Pont Croesor, and had submitted a draft Light Railway Order jointly with GCC for that section. It remained committed to its partnership with GCC. Author Gordon Rushton has claimed that GCC had leaked a copy of the memo from the county treasurer dated 21 September 1988 to WHLR (1964) Ltd, before the 5 January meeting. However inquiries made within WHR Ltd suggest it is more likely that following this meeting, GCC were asked if they could shed any light on the FR's claims. It was only then that they received a copy of the memo.

As a result, WHLR (1964) Ltd became very suspicious of the FR's motives. The FR was now claiming it wanted to help them to rebuild the railway, but had said nothing to them about this since they had submitted their secret bid two years previously. Furthermore, the leaked memo suggested that the FR wanted anything but to see the WHR re-opened. WHLR (1964) Ltd released a statement accusing the FR of meddling in its affairs and demanded that the FR withdraw its bid. Events were also reported by Ken Dicks to WHLR (1964) Ltd members, with the result that the FR's identity as the secret bidder finally became public knowledge.

=== A war of words ===
The involvement of the Ffestiniog Railway (FR) in WHR came as a shock to many UK railway enthusiasts. The anonymous bid had come out earlier, but the bidder's identity had remained a mystery. The FR tried to defend itself, saying that anybody was free to bid for the trackbed of the WHR and that they wanted to help WHLR (1964) Ltd, by acting as their landlord. It was argued that WHLR (1964) Ltd had accepted that they were going to have a landlord and so it might as well be the FR instead of GCC. They also argued that under the partnership between WHLR (1964) Ltd and GCC the opportunity of restoring the section of the WHR north of Beddgelert would be lost forever and that they wanted to preserve the possibility of restoring the whole railway. The FR further claimed that it had made the bid for the trackbed in secret to "deter speculators", but many were unconvinced.

Concerns were raised elsewhere, that the FR was "muscling in" on WHLR (1964) Ltd's ambitions and that they were trying to stifle the WHR's development, in particular by charging excessive rent. The Association of Railway Preservation Societies was asked to intervene and offered to arbitrate. However this offer was rebutted by the FR Company.

There was a significant backlash from WHR Ltd and much of the specialist railway press, culminating in a scathing editorial under the heading "This is not in the Spirit of Preservation Mr Routly." There was even opposition to the FR's involvement from within the FR's own support base, principally through concerns that rebuilding the WHR might adversely affect the Ffestiniog Railway itself. At one point the FR found itself facing censure motions by the Association of Railway Preservation Societies (ARPS) and the Association of Independent Railways (AIR). As the FR Company was a member of neither body, this was not directly relevant, but it left the Ffestiniog Railway Society, which was and is a member, fielding the ball. The board of the FR Society was roused by the criticism of their railway and backed the FR Company firmly. There was support for this stance among the society's membership, though there were dissenters.

Following the rejection by WHLR (1964) Ltd of the FR plan to act as landlord, the FR realised that the only way to prevent the sale of the trackbed to GCC was to challenge the application to the High Court by the OR. However, the FR was not a share or debenture holder in the old WHLR Company and thus it had no right to be represented at the High Court hearing.

Trackbed Consolidation Ltd had for some time been attempting to revive the original WHR 1922 company. Their strategy was to acquire shares and debentures in the original WHLR Company and then to seek to lift it out of receivership through a "scheme of arrangement". If this could be achieved, they also believed that the railway could then be rebuilt under the original 1922 light railway order, without having to seek new powers. However, after considerable expense on behalf of its members, notably John Ewing, Cedric Lodge and members of the Preston family, TCL found themselves unable to raise the funds to be part of the High Court case either.

It was originally the intent of TCL to lease or donate the trackbed to WHLR (1964) Ltd, who three times refused the offer. WHLR (1964) Ltd's refusal was based on concerns that lifting the old company out of receivership would not be possible and repeated advice from specialist railway solicitor (and WHLR (1964) Ltd member) Stephen Wiggs, that the 1922 LRO could not be reused and that new powers would have to be sought anyway. Now in the light of the FR being revealed as the secret bidder, TCL made another attempt to join forces with WHLR (1964) Ltd, but were again rebuffed.

With the FR now appearing to be promoting the restoration of the "whole railway", it seemed that there was common ground between the Festiniog Railway Company and Trackbed Consolidation Ltd. At some point, TCL and WestCo were introduced to the board of FR and first WestCo, then later TCL, agreed to join forces with the FR, to challenge the OR's application at the High Court, and to propose a new plan to restore the whole WHR. The deal involved TCL and WestCo handing their shares and debentures over to the FR. The FR would then be able to appear at the High Court hearing, to ask for a stay on the sale of the trackbed, in order to allow time for the FR to attempt a financial reconstruction of the old WHLR Company – using the strategy set out by TCL. The deal outlined what would happen if the FR obtained control of the railway, and committed the FR to using its best endeavours to restore and operate the whole of the WHR itself.

The Ffestiniog Railways' plan was to start the project at Caernarfon, rather than at the original WHR northern terminus at Dinas, because of the link to a town which already had a major tourist attraction already: the famous castle. This was a major change in FR policy and, although the reasons are complex, it is certainly true that the directors of the FR were far more positive about the WHR than at any time previously. Furthermore, funds were forthcoming from a director (Michael Schumann) for the substantial work required to develop the proposals and prepare for the necessary planning applications. However, it was necessary first to challenge the OR's plan to sell to GCC.

The shares and debentures owned by TCL and the West Consortium (WestCo) were purported to be transferred to the Festiniog Railway Company, but this was shown to be ultra vires. As a result, a new subsidiary company, Ffestiniog Railway Holdings Ltd, was formed, into which the shares and debentures were transferred. FR Holdings Ltd was thus able to take part in the High Court hearing.

=== The High Court hearing ===
The application by the OR to sell the WHR trackbed to GCC was heard in November 1991.

FR Holdings Ltd made two applications, the first was for the court to order the validation of the transfers of shares and debentures in the WHLR Company to FR Holdings. The second was for the court to order a stay on the sale of the trackbed to GCC, in order to allow time for FR Holdings to attempt a financial reconstruction of the WHLR Company.

However, Mr Justice Vinelott ruled the FR/TCL strategy of financial reconstruction to be 'wholly misconceived', as the WHLR Company was moribund i.e. there were no longer any living directors (and in particular, no company secretary). There was, therefore, nobody who could comply with any court order to validate share/debenture transfers and the court had no power to amend the register of members itself. Furthermore, there was no means to elect a new board. Mr Justice Vinelott, however, ruled that the solution to this problem was for FR Holdings (or GCC/WHLR (1964) Ltd) to apply for an amending order, under section 24 of the Light Railways Act 1896. This would transfer the 1922 LRO, with its remaining powers, from the 1922 WHLR company to the successful applicant. This would convey to the new holder of the LRO, the exclusive right to purchase the trackbed from the OR. A popular misconception is that only a railway company can apply for a transfer order, but this is incorrect. The fact is that anybody can apply for one. It was also made clear formally at this point that any applicant for a transfer order would have to rebuild the whole railway. Mr Justice Vinelott also ruled that the existing 1922 light railway order could not be used to rebuild the railway and that new powers would have to be sought – Stephen Wiggs had been right. The judge did not pass judgement on the OR's application but, instead, granted a stay, to allow time for both parties to apply for a transfer order. The judge further stated that he was suspicious of GCC's motives for the rest of the trackbed past Pont Croesor.

After the hearing, both the FR and WHLR (1964) Ltd claimed victory. However, in reality, there were no clear winners. The trackbed had not been sold to GCC and the FR's strategy had been shown to be unworkable. The judgment in effect deferred the outcome of the battle for the WHR trackbed, until the matter of the transfer order was settled following a public inquiry in 1994. However, if there were no clear winners, there was one clear loser. Trackbed Consolidation Ltd's whole raison d'etre had been based around the premise that the WHLR Company of 1922 could be revived and that the railway could be rebuilt under the original 1922 LRO. The judgement meant that TCL had been wrong all along, on both counts, and that WHLR (1964) Ltd had been right to reject their approaches. This proved to be a source of some embarrassment to the FR.

=== The 1993 Public Inquiry ===
Both groups duly applied for a transfer order, ensuring that either plan would involve the rebuilding of the whole route, something that had very much been in doubt previously, because of the aforementioned road/footpath schemes, the attitude of GCC etc. The competing applications led, in 1993, to the calling of a public inquiry, to be held at the Royal Hotel in Caernarfon, beginning on 2 November.

Following the High Court hearing, FR Company chairman John Routly had faced criticism over his handling of the FR's intervention in the WHR. According to author Gordon Rushton (FR General Manager at the time), there were also concerns over how the ageing Routly might perform under cross-examination at the forthcoming Inquiry. As a result, Routly was encouraged to stand down as FR Company chairman (though he remained as a trustee) before the inquiry began. Routly was replaced as FR Company chairman by Mike Hart.

The inquiry inspector, Mr J. Alan Morgan, had to determine the answer to two questions:

1. Was restoration of the WHR in the public interest (in other words - should an Amending Order be made at all?)
2. If restoration of the WHR was in the public interest - which of the two applicants should the order be made out to?.

During the inquiry, the FR's case suffered a blow, when the council memo and correspondence of 1988 were produced as evidence, together with a secretly recorded telephone conversation involving an FR director. These revealed the original "buy to shut" policy and cast doubt on the FR's intentions and whether they truly intended to rebuild the railway. To counter this, while the inquiry was still on-going, the FR entered into a legally binding agreement with GCC, to the effect that if they gained a transfer order, they would go through with re-building the WHR and would commence work within five years. Failure to do so would result in the FR having to hand the trackbed over to GCC.

The independent inspector, after having presided over a four-week public inquiry and after reviewing all the submitted evidence, found that the WHR should be re-built and found in favour of the WHR Ltd and GCC application. In the report, the inspector set out the following reasons for his recommendations;

1. The support of Gwynedd County Council, Dwyfor District Council and the community councils would be a major advantage in dealing with any planning or environmental problems which might occur in the rebuilding process.
2. A higher level of public grant funding would be forthcoming as a result of the involvement of Gwynedd County Council.
3. WHLR (1964) Ltd's facilities at Porthmadog should be a considerable advantage, which should be further enhanced by the support of the Dwyfor District Council.
4. WHLR (1964) Ltd would be dedicated to the task of rebuilding the WHR, whereas the FR had a number of other significant projects in hand which, at times, might take precedence over the rebuilding of the WHR.
5. The FR's activities are controlled by a small group of shareholders, providing firm and positive control for the commercial organisation which the FR has now become. However, the role of volunteers would be significant in the rebuilding of the WHR, and the more democratic form of control within WHLR'64 was more likely to generate the required level of volunteer support.

The report was released by the then Secretary of State for Transport, John MacGregor, together with McGregor's decision, on 20 July 1994 (McGregor's last day in office). McGregor however, overruled the inspector's recommendations, in favour of the FR/TCL application. The announcement of the decision stated that it was mainly on the grounds that the FR scheme would not involve a public body or public funding and therefore reduced the consequent risks to the public sector.

Although the reasons given for McGregor's decision fitted well with the political outlook of the Conservative government, the decision attracted widespread criticism. There were suspicions that the FR had used contacts in the Conservative Party to influence McGregor's decision. and there were accusations of 'gerrymandering'. In a letter to FR General Manager Gordon Rushton, local MP Dafydd Wigley said;

Quite clearly, the decision by John McGregor MP has caused a very bitter reaction and, I am afraid that it is polarising opinion in my constituency against the Festiniog Railway. Rightly or wrongly, you are being considered as having 'nobbled' the Secretary of State and 'put a boot in' on the Welsh Highland Railway Company [i.e. WHLR (1964)Ltd].

Writing in 2012, Gordon Rushton said;

There has always been an accusation that FR Co tried to exert influence at Westminster. Indeed information has come to light that there was an intervention, but it was neither proposed nor supported by FR Co and was perfectly proper. Who it was, what they said, and to whom, must remain privileged information for the present.

The "intervention" mentioned by Gordon Rushton remained a matter of speculation until 2015. In the spring issue of the new Welsh Highland Society's magazine, there was a letter from FR society member John Mayhead. Mayhead had been an active member of the FR Society's Milton Keynes area group. The letter said;

I remember how the inspector came down in favour of our friends down the road in Porthmadog at a public inquiry as to who should get the "old company" and how he did not find in our favour! At that time, I was a constituency personal advisor to the Attorney General (unpaid of course) the late Sir Nicholas Lyell (later Lord Lyell). The decision irked me as being totally unrealistic and doomed to failure, so on our next meeting I discussed this with him, explaining what the Ffestiniog had done and how it had all the facilities and experience to progress the restoration and how our friends down the road, however well meaning, just did not have the facilities or more importantly the experience to carry the job through, nor had they done anything in 30 years. After ten minutes he said ”OK John, I accept your argument and I owe you one anyway, I will do it!” the rest is history. I suppose this should really have waited to be made public under the thirty year rule but I won’t live that long and my memory is the only record so I am telling you now! I also wrote to Lord Prescott and asked him to him to gee up the National Parks Authority as this railway was the only "By-Pass" Beddgelert was ever going to get and they needed it now! I only had an acknowledgement from him but the decision to start work followed in days rather than weeks...

WHLR (1964) Ltd considered appealing McGregor's decision, but this would have been an expensive option, with no guarantee of success and WHLR (1964) Ltd did not have the funds. Consequently, McGregor's decision went unchallenged. WHLR (1964) Ltd then had to consider their options.

After this, the FR Trust formed a subsidiary company called the Welsh Highland Light Railway to rebuild the railway. The first section of the new WHR, between Caernarfon and Dinas, was built under one of the last Light Railway Orders to be granted and opened in 1997. The Caernarfon to Dinas section (known as "Phase 1") did not form part of the old WHR route but had been part of the old LNWR standard gauge line to Afon Wen. Between Pen y Groes and Caernarfon, that line had largely been built over the course of a narrow gauge line, the Nantlle Railway built at 3 ft 6 in (1,067 mm) gauge and running from Nantlle to Caernarfon Slate Quay from 1828 to 1867.

=== The 1998 agreement ===
Following the 1991 High Court ruling, the FR was obliged to obtain new statutory powers, in order to rebuild the WHR. On 25 March 1997, the FR applied for a works order under the Transport and Works Act (which had replaced the Light Railways Act) to complete the railway from Dinas to Porthmadog. However, the application was overtaken by the general election, held on 1 May 1997. The new prime minister, Tony Blair, appointed John Prescott as the new secretary of state for transport. By the closing date for objections over 350 had been received. Among them were a number of objections which related specifically to that part of the proposed route through Porthmadog, known as the "Cross Town Link" (CTL). Prominent among these objectors to the CTL was the highways department of the Welsh Office, who took particular exception to the proposed crossing of Britannia Bridge on safety and environmental grounds. As a result of these objections, a public inquiry into the T&WA works order application was announced by Transport Minister Glenda Jackson on 5 June.

Another significant objector was WHR Ltd (formerly WHLR (1964) Ltd). Their objection related to the possible compulsory purchase of some of their land. But they also intended to state that the CTL was unnecessary, as they would be prepared to make their running line from Pen y Mount to Porthmadog (WHR) available to the FR, on "suitable terms", as an alternative to the CTL. This presented a strong possibility that if Prescott were to approve a T&WA works order, he might only grant powers for the FR to rebuild the WHR as far south as Pen y Mount. This would have been the perfect compromise, which would have allowed Prescott to address the concerns of one of his own government departments, while still allowing the WHR to be rebuilt between Caernarfon and Porthmadog. To Prescott, there would also be some sound economic arguments, for having the southern terminus of the WHR at the opposite end of Porthmadog, to the FR's Harbour Station.

However, the result of such a decision would be that the FR would be denied the opportunity to have a direct link between its two railways and would be forced to negotiate an access agreement with WHR Ltd, to allow its trains to run over WHR Ltd track into Porthmadog (WHR) station. Having WHR Ltd as its landlord at the southern end also meant accepting that WHR Ltd would have the power to ensure that any promises made to secure such access would be honoured and would be able to prevent access to Porthmadog in the event of any future dispute between the two companies. The only way to avoid this would be for the FR to somehow persuade WHR Ltd to withdraw their objection, so that their statement of case was not included in the evidence presented by the inquiry inspector to John Prescott.

Fresh negotiations began in August 1997, after an approach by FR Company chairman Mike Hart, to WHR Ltd legal advisor Tom Sharratt. These negotiations broke down in late September, The main sticking points were the terms under which WHR Ltd would construct a section of the WHR, access rights for WHR Ltd trains over the completed railway and the use of the "Welsh Highland Railway" name, which WHR Ltd had successfully registered as a trademark in 1996.

With the public inquiry looming, negotiations resumed in late November and the two sides reached the basis of an agreement. WHR Ltd agreed to withdraw their objection to the CTL. In return, the FR agreed to allow (and fully support) the construction, by WHR Ltd, of the section of the WHR between Pen-y-Mount and Pont Croesor. In addition to this, the FR agreed that once finished, WHR Ltd could operate their own services over the Pen-y-Mount to Pont Croesor section, until the "head of steel" arrived at Pont Croesor from the north. Thereafter, the FR also agreed to allow "guaranteed access" for WHR locomotives and rolling stock to operate over the whole route.

Initially, this deal was set out in a memorandum of understanding, signed on 30 November. The public inquiry opened on 9 December and as it progressed, further negotiations took place. These resulted in a formal legally binding agreement. The agreement was signed on 12 January 1998 and meant (assuming the T&WA works order was granted) the FR would begin rebuilding from the north end of the line, whilst WHR Ltd would expand its railway from the south onto the original WHR trackbed towards Pont Croesor. However, there were restrictions placed by the agreement on the construction of the "Pont Croesor Extension". WHR Ltd would not be authorised to begin any work on the extension until the FR's head of steel had reached Waunfawr and furthermore, they were effectively prevented from seeking grant funding to pay for the work – forcing them to rely on a fundraising appeal. On the other hand, the agreement effectively left the timescale for completion of the Pont Croesor extension open-ended, stating that WHR Ltd only had to proceed with construction work "as soon as practicable".

The agreement also established the conventions of referring to the two ends of the line using the names Welsh Highland Railway (Caernarfon) and Welsh Highland Railway (Porthmadog). It was hoped by many, that this agreement would ensure that the new WHR would operate as a viable passenger railway and also as a heritage attraction; as well as bringing to an end the bitterness which had existed between the two parties.

In accordance with the agreement, WHR Ltd formally withdrew their application to the T&WA works order application and declared their full support, before the public inquiry closed.

Unfortunately in his report, the public inquiry inspector found against the proposal because he thought the benefit inside the national park was not sufficient to warrant reconstruction within a national park, but this was overturned by John Prescott, the Deputy Prime Minister, who thought the benefits outside the national park outweighed the lack of benefit within it. At the time, the government was actively promoting alternatives to the car. This go-ahead was, however, conditional on the commissioning of reports into the stability of rocks in the Aberglaslyn Pass. FR's consultant engineers acted swiftly and the reports were delivered before the powers were devolved to the new Welsh Assembly Government.

A further legal challenge, causing even more delay, was then mounted by the National Farmers' Union, but this failed.

=== Rebuilding to Porthmadog ===
Four phases of the WHR were opened between 1997 and 2011:

- Phase One: Caernarfon to Dinas (opened October 1997);
- Phase Two: Dinas to Waunfawr (opened August 2000);
- Phase Three: Waunfawr to Rhyd Ddu (opened 2003);
- Phase Four from Rhyd Ddu to Porthmadog for which a new subsidiary, the Welsh Highland Railway Construction Company, was formed to build the line which was opened in stages to Beddgelert (April 2009), Hafod y Llyn (May 2009), Pont Croesor (April 2010) and Porthmadog (January 2011), including the WHR Ltd's 700-metre section built from Pen-y-Mount to a temporary loop in the Traeth Mawr (2006).

For a while, WHR Ltd ran trains on the old WHR trackbed as far as Traeth Mawr (about halfway between Porthmadog and Pont Croesor) and it is worth noting that this extension was completed with volunteer labour. In 2009, this section became part of the construction company's line and WHR Ltd ceased running trains on this section. Unfortunately they had not completed the line to Pont Croesor as intended, leaving the WHR Construction Company (FR) to complete the line. The civil engineering of the new line was undertaken by local contractors, while FR volunteers laid the whole of the 25 miles of new track from Caernarfon to Porthmadog, sometimes with welcome help from outside, ranging from the president and vice-presidents of the Permanent Way Institution to students from Imperial College. The WHR(P) sent a welcome couple of parties.

The cost of reconstruction was of the order of £30 million. Of this, about 45% came from the Millennium Commission and the European Regional Development Fund through the Welsh Assembly Government, mostly as matching funding for other contributions. European rules are that the EU will, in depressed areas such as North Wales, contribute pound-for-pound for money raised by the promoters of the scheme and for volunteer effort given in practical ways. Much of the rest was raised by generous financial contributions from members and well-wishers (about £15 million); over £1 million was raised as matching funding to volunteer efforts (mainly but not exclusively by members of Cymdeithas Rheilffordd Eryri / Welsh Highland Railway Society). Over £200k was raised in cash by CRhE/WHRS and another £100k in cash and volunteer effort by WHR Ltd of Porthmadog.

Services were extended from Hafod y Llyn to Pont Croesor in April 2010. The final section of the line (Pont Croesor to Porthmadog), which includes the Pen y Mount to Traeth Mawr section, opened in January 2011, although trackwork construction was completed in March 2009, allowing special stock transfers. Signalling at the Cae Pawb Crossing with the Cambrian Coast line needed some ingenuity. Delays were caused by a legal dispute with the North Wales Trunk Road Agency about repair costs for a retaining wall at Britannia Bridge and the difficulty of accommodating two trains at once in Porthmadog Harbour Station.

In early 2012 a programme began to widen the Cob at Porthmadog Harbour Station to make room for two platforms, affording a proper interchange between the Ffestiniog Railway and Rheilffrdd Eryri/Welsh Highland Railway. This work was completed in the spring of 2014 and the FR and RhE trains may now be seen side by side. The signalling is completely new and is the most complex piece of signalling on the entire system. The new signal box and relay room are robust and withstood the 100 mph gales of January 2014. The FR platform is reputedly the longest platform on any of the minor railways and is said to be long enough to hold an eleven-car Pendolino – if it were able to go round the curve at the Porthmadog end.

=== The future of the railway ===
The completed railway of nearly 25 miles (40 km) is owned by the FR. The WHR Porthmadog to Pen-y-Mount section (under a mile and not on the old WHR route) remains the property of WHR Ltd, who now trade as Welsh Highland Heritage Railway. Relations between FR and the WHHR are becoming far more cordial after the WHHR AGM in 2010 and a trial WHHR train ran to Hafod y Llyn in 2011; the locomotive Gelert ran to Beddgelert.

A few members of the FR Society remained concerned regarding the impact of the project on the FR itself and on the impact to the FR's heritage, particularly at Harbour Station and Boston Lodge works. The FR Company board consider that this will be manageable. The firm belief of the FR Company board – justified on figures to 2016 – is that the new WHR will be profitable and allow for extra funds to be invested in the railways in the future, whilst having protected the FR from potentially damaging competition.

A landmark was reached in July 2011 when ticket revenue from the rebuilt Welsh Highland Railway exceeded that from the FR for the first time (information from FR Company officers and from FR Company accounts for the year 2011).

A study carried out at Bangor University [Dr M Phillips PhD thesis] showed that the return to the local economy amounted by 2010 to far more than the 50% grants (from the Millennium Commission and the European Regional Development Fund) which had been made to build the railway and that, as well as the railway's own employees, some 350 local jobs from shops to hoteliers were dependent on the railway for a living.

== Obstruction and objections ==
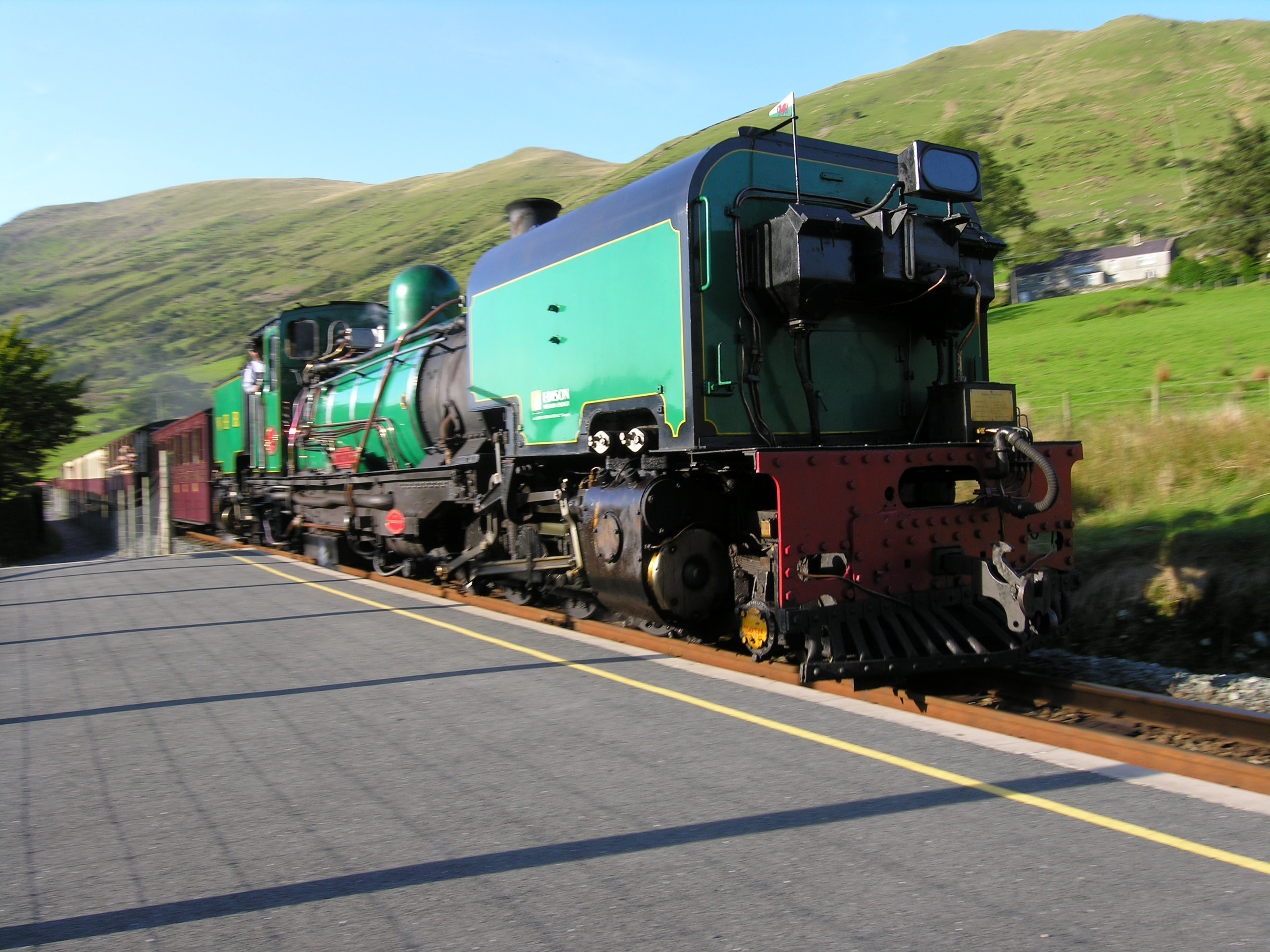
138 'Mileniwm'/'Millennium' SAR NGG 16 Class Garratt arrives at Snowdon Ranger station with a southbound service from Caernarfon to Rhyd Ddu

A number of local residents protested against the rebuilding of the Welsh Highland Railway. They argued that the railway would damage the sensitive landscape and environment of the Snowdonia National Park, one of Wales's most scenic areas. It has not, in the event, done so.

Some residents in the village of Beddgelert objected to the railway because they feared it would bring increased road traffic to the tourist village. For this reason, the Snowdonia National Park Authority stipulated that trains should not terminate in the national park except at Rhyd Ddu, until the railway was finished. Further, the railway company is not to provide a car park at Beddgelert station and there will be no direct road access to the station. Access is by public footpaths – one with steps and a longer one with ramps for wheelchairs – from the central car park.

Relations with some of the community in Beddgelert were difficult for a time, mainly because of the company's plans for the station there. The railway sought powers to construct a building 70 ft x 40 ft, sufficient to hold 300 people – two trainloads – in the rain, but some residents expressed concern that it would be intrusive and too close to their homes. Planning permission for a slightly modified building was subsequently granted, though with a condition that the railway company should not have a café on the site. The railway appealed against this decision and was successful, but no building work has yet begun on the permanent building, other than the casting of a foundation slab; a wooden building in the usual RhE style has been set up.

The WHR rebuilding has also been the subject of more direct action in the past. One local resident near Plas-y-Nant, upon hearing that the construction of the railway was to go ahead, tipped a large mound of manure onto the original alignment. When the railway station at Rhyd Ddu was being completed, the station notice board was stolen, and vandals used spray paint in various places to spell out "Dim WHR" ("No WHR"). This included signs, rocks and the container holding the small construction diesel "Dolgarrog". However, these graffiti were relatively small in scale and were quickly removed.

The day before the visit of Prince Charles to Rhyd Ddu, when a test train was being run to ensure smooth operation the next day, a football-sized rock was found placed on the track. This was spotted, the train stopped and the rock removed.

The site of the Porthmadog terminus has also been a source of some debate in the town as some locals suggested that WHR trains should terminate at the WHR Ltd station to avoid excessive train movements across Porthmadog High Street and the consequent delay to traffic. The FR, however, preferred to have the trains arrive at the Harbour Station to afford a connection to their main line to Blaenau Ffestiniog. The traffic jams in Porthmadog were already sufficiently bad that the level crossing made little difference; the issue was resolved by the opening of the new Porthmadog by-pass (A487) in September 2011. An extension to the Cob, to widen the Harbour Station formation, was built in early 2012.

== Two Welsh Highland Railways ==
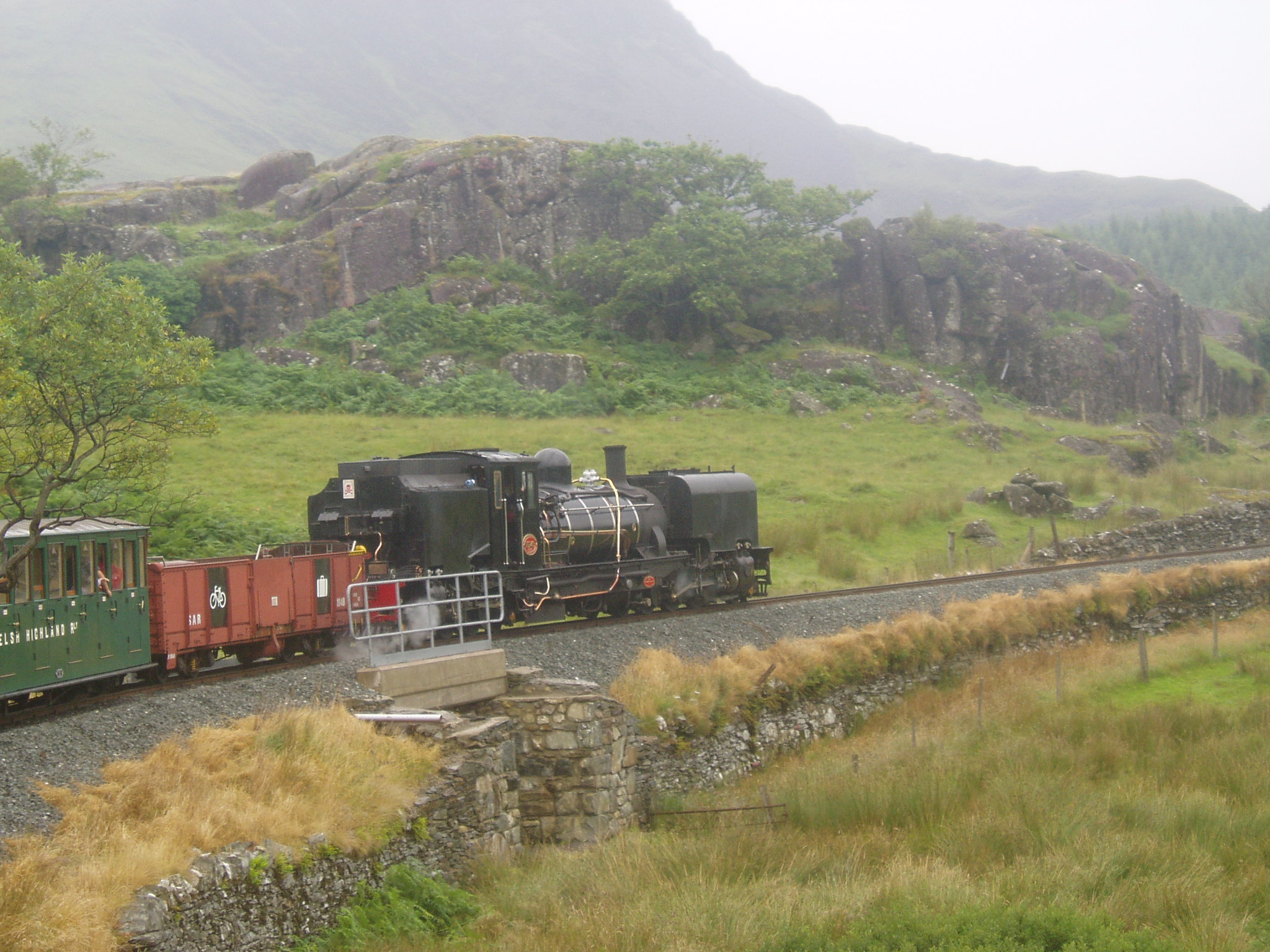
SAR NGG 16 Class Garratt Locomotive No. 143 in the countryside

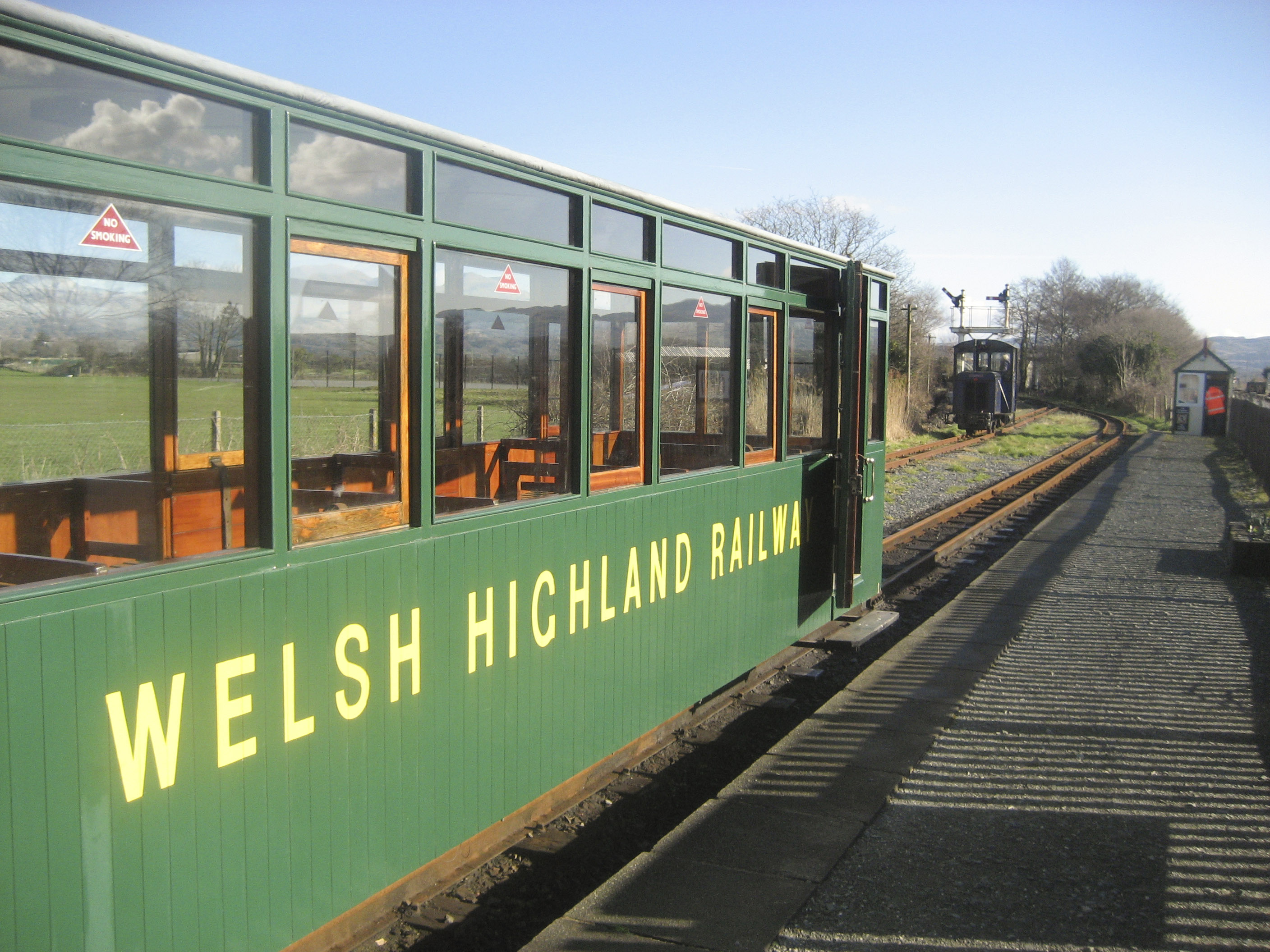
Train at WHHR station in Porthmadog

Today, there are two parts of the Welsh Highland Railway open, one of 1 km in Porthmadog (which opened in 1980) and one for 25 miles (40 km) from Caernarfon to Porthmadog (which opened in stages from 1997 to 2011).

The WHR Ltd's existing line in Porthmadog, known as the "Welsh Highland Heritage Railway", continues to develop the heritage atmosphere of the old railway, and offers a shorter alternative ride and a newly expanded museum. Original locomotives and rolling stock from the WHR and other lines are being restored to a high standard, to ensure that an authentic WHR heritage train will be able to run on the completed line. The WHR Ltd has received much acclaim for the interactive tour of the sheds, which all passengers get as part of their train ride. In 2005, the WHR Ltd celebrated 25 years since the rebirth of the Welsh Highland with increased passenger numbers and the entry into service of a second original Welsh Highland carriage.

The WHR Ltd extension made progress northwards using volunteer labour from their existing terminus at Pen-y-Mount to a new temporary loop at Traeth Mawr, being officially opened in August 2006 by the President of the Welsh Assembly Lord Dafydd Elis Thomas, and which opened for the 2007 and 2008 seasons. This is now part of the Caernarfon to Porthmadog line: WHR Ltd have reverted to running their short service to Pen y Mount, in conjunction with an excellent museum visit and miniature railway.

The main line from Caernarfon to Porthmadog, or Rheilffordd Eryri, was constructed with the help of grants from the Millennium Commission, the Welsh Assembly and many individuals. Never before has so large a scheme been undertaken in the minor railway field.

The section to Rhyd Ddu was inaugurated by the visit of the Prince of Wales on 30 July 2003. Prince Charles travelled from Waunfawr to Snowdon Ranger in a replica NWNGR coach hauled by the Ffestiniog Railway locomotive 'Prince' and, from Snowdon Ranger to Rhyd Ddu, he rode on the locomotive footplate.

Funding for Phase Four, the final section of the line from Rhyd Ddu to Porthmadog, was announced in September 2004, thanks to a package of grants from the European Regional Development Fund, the Welsh Assembly Government and private donations. The public appeal became the most successful public railway appeal ever, according to Steam Railway magazine, and the line opened in 2011.

Trains are operated by staff and volunteers of both the Ffestiniog & Welsh Highland Railways. With the commencement of public services between Caernarfon and Dinas in 1997, all train operations on the Welsh Highland Railway (Caernarfon) have been directly controlled from the central control office at Porthmadog Harbour railway station and this continues.

The agreement signed between the former rivals meant that Phase Four saw the Welsh Highland Railway Limited playing a role in the reconstruction of the line. Fittingly, in October 2005, it was the volunteers of the original revival company who laid the first lengths of track in the final (southern) phase, an emotional moment for many of that organisation's long-standing members.

=== Phase 1: Caernarfon to Dinas ===
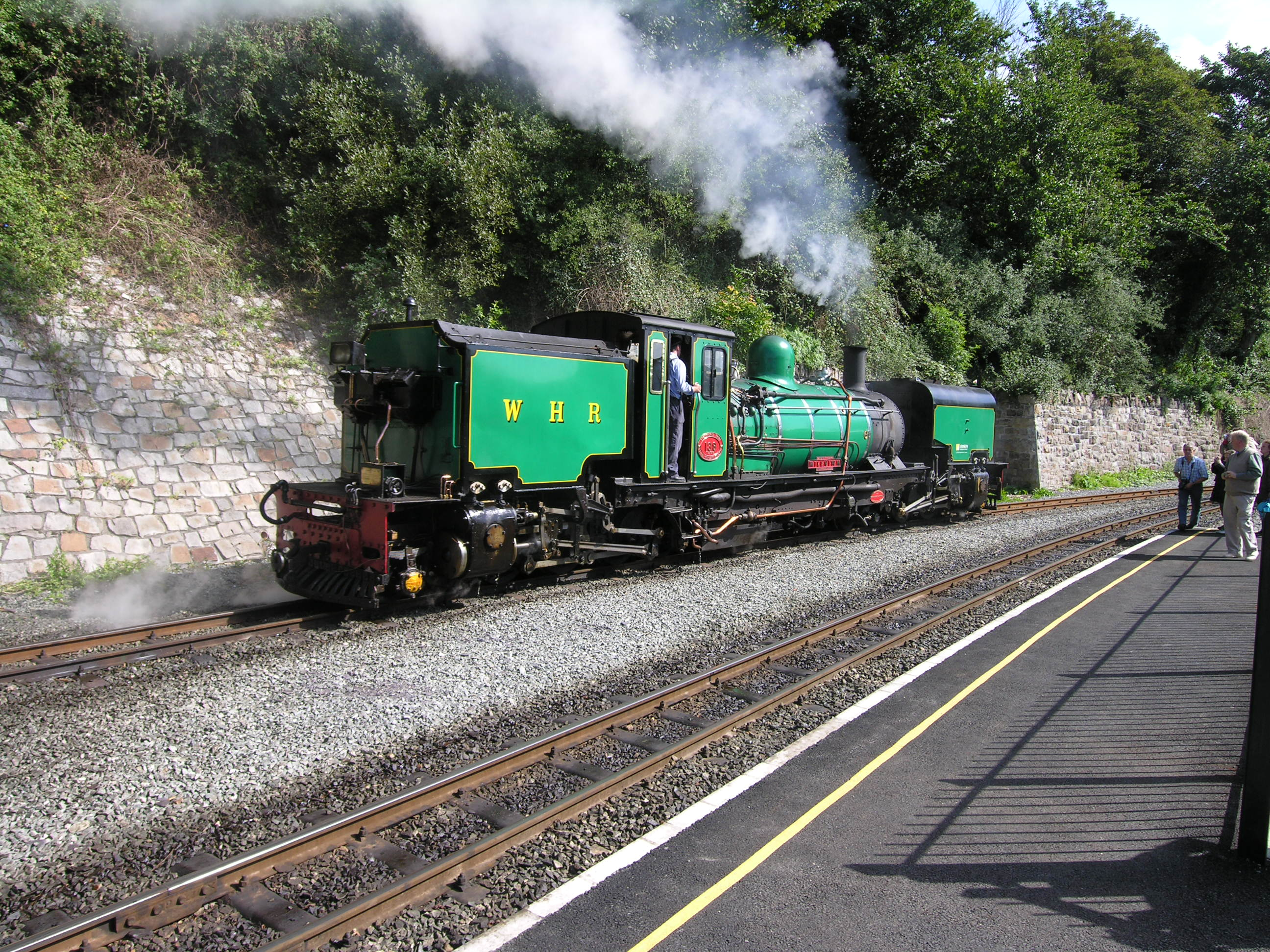
SAR NGG 16 Class Garratt 138 pictured at Caernarfon WHR Station, running round its train during the 2006 'Superpower' weekend

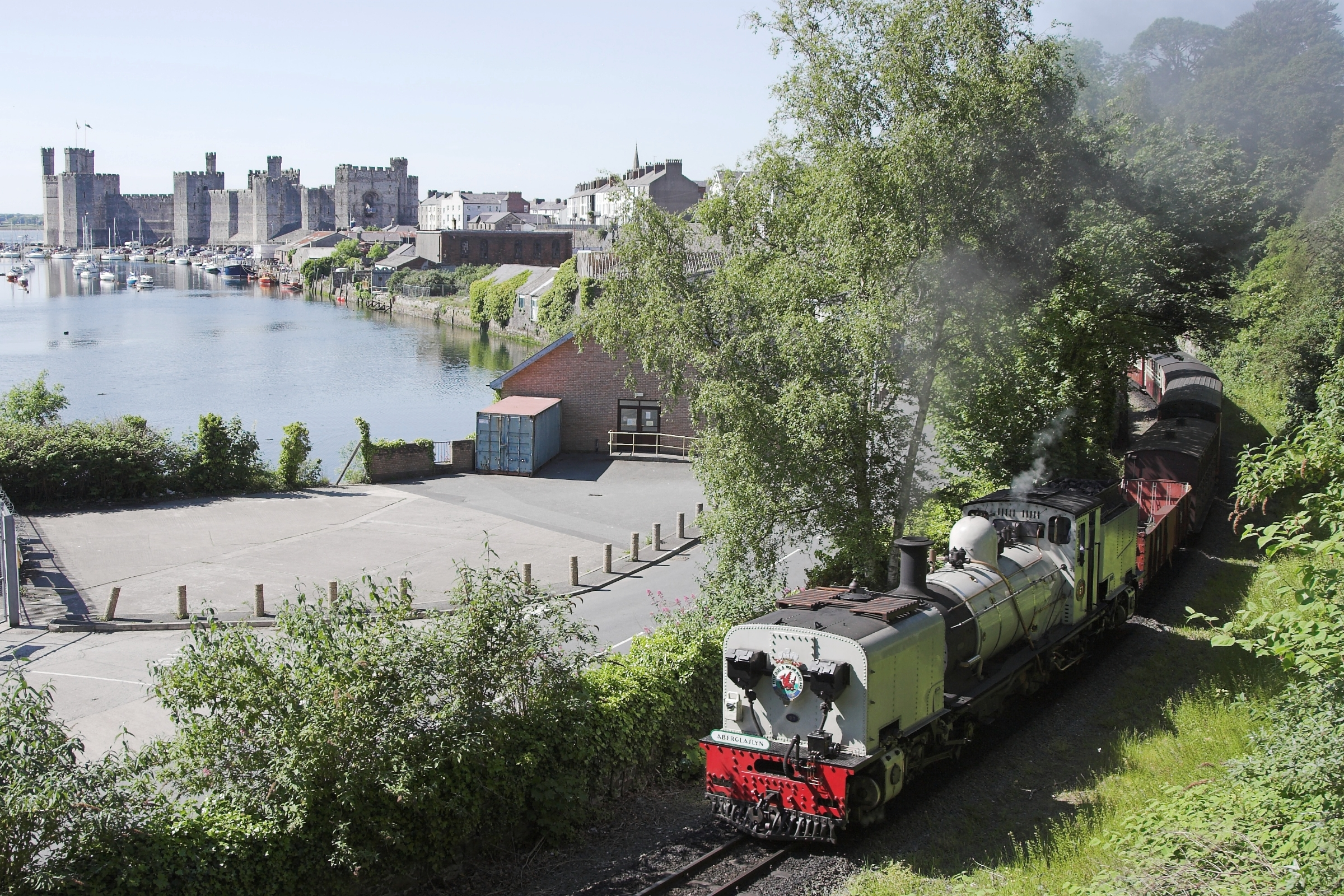
A train with NG87 leaving Caernarfon, May 2009

The original railway from Nantlle to Carnarvon (as it was) via Dinas opened in 1828. This was at first 3 ft 6in gauge but was converted to standard gauge and re-aligned in 1867, operating until 1969. It then lay derelict for twenty-odd years, but the major structures – earthworks, viaducts and bridges – remained intact in the ownership of Gwynedd Council.

The first three miles (5 km) of the WHR (Caernarfon)'s route uses the abandoned standard gauge trackbed between Caernarfon and Dinas and was officially opened on 13 October 1997. This part of the line originally formed a route from Bangor to Afonwen, which used to link the North Wales Coast Line with the Cambrian Coast, until the closure of the Caernarfon-Afonwen section in 1964: the Bangor - Caernarfon section was closed in 1971.

The North Wales Narrow Gauge Railways had previously obtained powers to construct an extension from Dinas to Caernarfon and these had been transferred to the Welsh Highland Railway but had not been exercised.

The trackbed from Caernarfon to Dinas and beyond, owned by Gwynedd County Council, was opened as a footpath and cycletrack, Lôn Eifion, in the 1980s and this now runs parallel to the railway. Between Caernarfon and Dinas, the railway formation is leased to the Ffestiniog Railway for 999 years. The Phase 1 work included the construction of narrow gauge stations in St. Helen's Road (adjacent to the slate quay in Caernarfon) and on the site of the former standard gauge station at Dinas. The intermediate halt at Bontnewydd was built in 1999, following requests and a petition from villagers.

Between Caernarfon and Dinas, the route was originally part of the narrow gauge 3 ft 6 in (1,067 mm) Nantlle Railway from 1828 until conversion in 1867 to standard gauge as part of the Carnarvonshire Railway later absorbed by the LNWR, and in turn the LMS and British Railways, up to closure in 1964. There are places between Caernarfon and Dinas where the route diverged from the 1828 original, whose remains can still be seen. Just outside Caernarfon, on the western side of the track, an old Nantlle tunnel can be seen adjacent to the propped bridge. Near the bridge at Bontnewydd, on the eastern side, may be seen the old Nantlle embankment, and the arch of the original river bridge, which still stands over 130 years after being abandoned.

Two original NWNGR buildings remain at Dinas. The station building has been restored to its original purpose and, as far as practicable, its 1880 external appearance. Significant historical, practical and financial assistance with this was given by the Welsh Highland Heritage Group and by others. The Welsh Highland Railway was presented with a Railway World "Ian Allan National Railway Heritage Award" at a ceremony at Dinas on 12 May 2001. The original NWNGR goods shed has been restored to railway use, principally as a workshop; it is also used for the annual Gwŷl Gwrw or Beer Festival (access only on foot or by train!)

Dinas has two railway yards. The north yard, originally the exchange yard with the LNWR, was used during the closure period by Gwynedd County Council as an engineering depot. The South yard had been the main works and stabling area, which was being used by Welsh Water / Dŵr Cymru. These yards had been previously sold by the Official Receiver and had to be bought back. The north yard now contains the station building, goods shed and a large carriage shed built since restoration. This yard, which is separated from the smaller south yard by a public road and by the former standard gauge bridge, also houses the railway's engineering department and Construction Company office. The south yard contains the engine shed and locomotive workshops.

The work of reconstruction fell into two parts; first, the preparation of three miles (5 km) of trackbed with a granite ballasted surface, stations, and the realignment of the Lôn Eifion cycleway and footpath alongside, was undertaken by civil engineering contractor John Mowlem plc in a contract worth £750,000 in December 1996. This major work started on 6 January 1997 and in addition involved also the strengthening and waterproofing of two river bridges, Pont Seiont at Caernarfon and the viaduct over the Afon Gwyrfai at Bontnewydd. First, the formation above the bridges was stripped down to the brick arches, which were found to be in good condition 130 years after their construction. The tops of the arches were then backfilled with concrete, and a waterproof membrane added before remaking the formation. This contract was substantially completed during June 1997.

The large Funkey diesel locomotive had been delivered to Dinas and stored in the Goods shed on 14 January 1997 but nothing more could be done at Dinas until access to the formation was obtained in mid-May 1997 and this enabled the start of the second part of the reconstruction task, which was undertaken by Ffestiniog Railway subsidiary company Welsh Highland Light Railway Ltd assisted by very many volunteer groups. Foremost in this were the Welsh Highland Railway Society's volunteer "Black Hand Gang", "Rest of the World Gang" and "Tuesday Gang" who made a tremendous contribution. Many other volunteer groups made valuable tracklaying visits including teams from the Llangollen Railway and the Mid-Hants Railway. However, the gang that came from WHR (Porthmadog) as part of their "Civils Week programme" set a remarkable record, for the most track laid in a single day, of 13 lengths, which stood for eight years.

For the restoration of WHR (Caernarfon), the Ffestiniog Railway imported not only South African steam engines (some were built in Manchester by Beyer Peacock and Company as recently as 1958) but also the rails and steel sleepers on which to run them. This track included eighty completely made up panels of 2 ft (610 mm) gauge (adjusted before use to 1 ft 11 1/2 in (597 mm) gauge) straight track (for the laying of which a special rail mounted track laying gantry – 'The Forth Bridge' – was built by Winson Engineering Ltd). The greater part of the rail came with a job lot of steel sleepers, clips, screws, bolts and fishplates, all to several different patterns, which had to be sorted by WHR and FR volunteers before they could be used. The bulk of the track including all the curved sections was built up on site with rails moved forward to the railhead using specially built rail grab trolleys known as RRMs – "Roland's Rail Movers", named after WHLR Ltd construction manager Roland Doyle. These proved to be a highly successful innovation and they have been used on all subsequent tracklaying. Amusingly, they have also acquired the nickname "Roland Rats", a title believed to have originated among the track gangs at the Porthmadog end, who also use the same technology.

Access to Dinas South Yard (site of the original engine sheds) was obtained on 11 August 1997 and existing buildings were converted for use as the locomotive depot. The depot, together with the line to Waunfawr is now reached via the standard gauge overbridge and the low narrow gauge overbridge now provides a road link between the two yards.

Tracklaying, including pointwork at Dinas and Caernarfon was mostly completed by mid-September 1997, three miles (5 km) in four months and a truly remarkable achievement. Two steam locomotives (Beyer-Garratt 138 and FR Mountaineer) and five new carriages were delivered to Dinas on 23 September 1997. A whole team of inspectors from the Ministry of Transport descended on the railway on 2 October 1997 for a thorough inspection, over several days, not just of the line of railway, but also the entire stock of locomotives, carriages and wagons. After the company had fixed items in the snagging list, provisional approval was given for the line to open for a six-week trial period subject to the receipt of a Light Railway Order, which was granted on 9 October 1997. Public passenger service started on Saturday, 11 October 1997. The line was officially opened on 13 October 1997 by the Mayor of Caernarfon, Mrs Mair Williams, with speeches from the Chairmen of the Welsh Highland Railway Society and the Ffestiniog Railway Company, also from Dafydd Wigley MP and a representative of the Millennium Commission.

In 2017–19 a new station was built at Caernarfon. Cadw did not wish the station to resemble the nearby Caernarfon Castle, so a modern design was used. The adjacent Slate Quay is being restored as well, to give visitors an experience of the ambience of Caernarfon as a slate port.

=== Phase 2: Dinas to Waunfawr ===
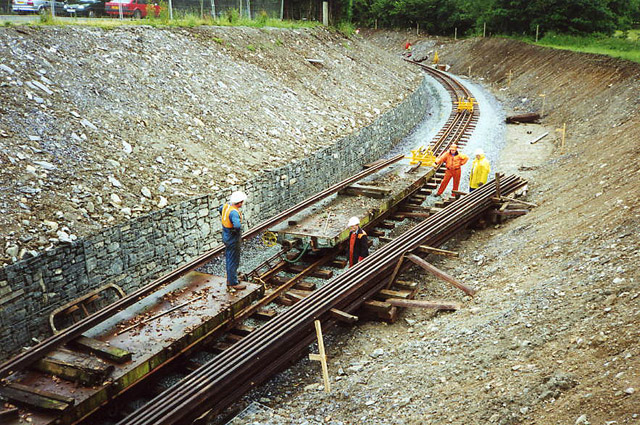
Building the tracks near Dinas

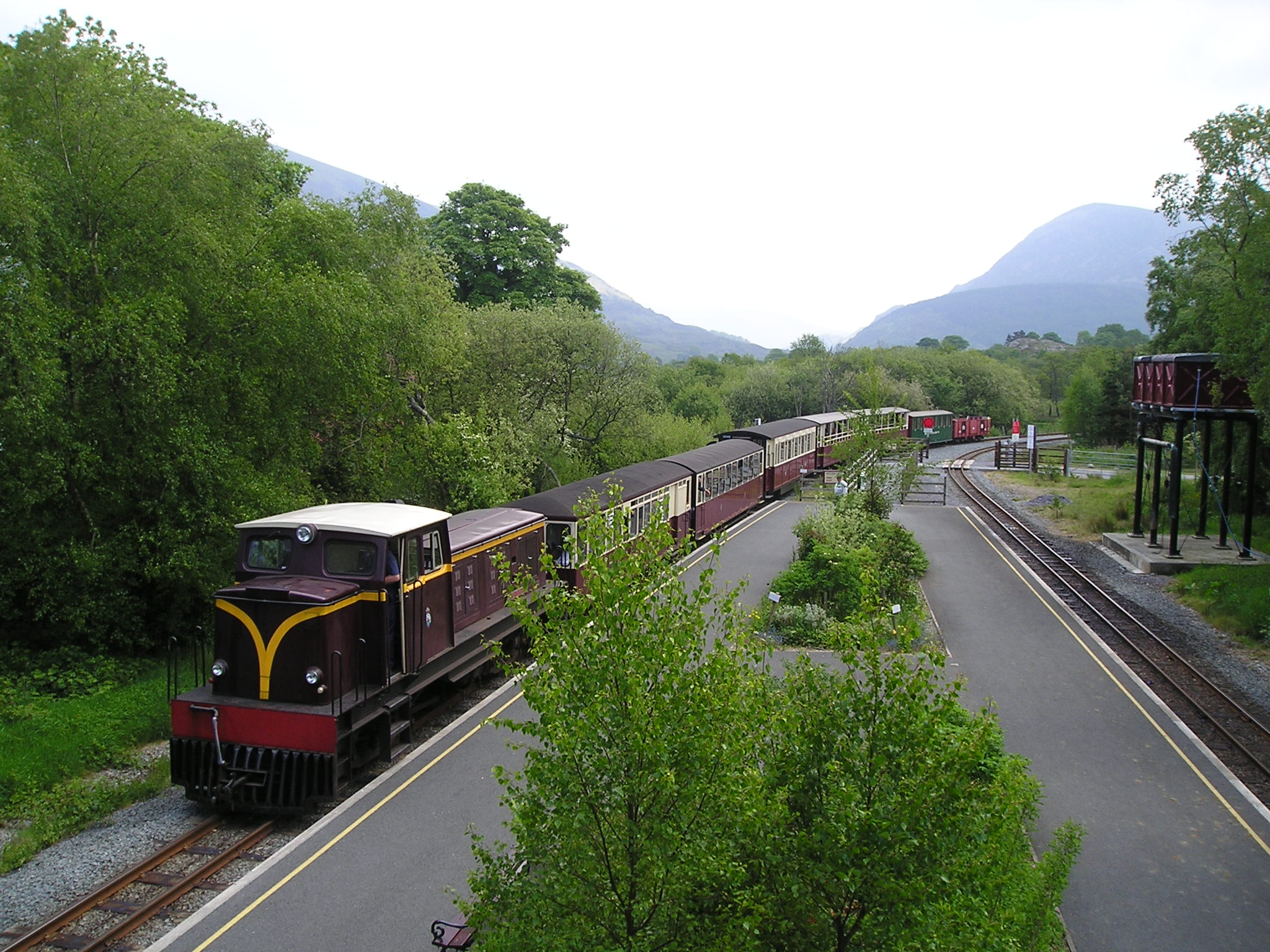
Down train arriving at Waunfawr from Rhyd Ddu, powered by diesel locomotive "Castell Caernarfon" on 26 May 2004

Having passed under Dinas station bridge and skirted the south yard, the Caernarfon - Dinas section of the restored Welsh Highland Railway joins the first four-mile (6 km) section of the original North Wales Narrow Gauge Railways line and runs north-eastwards gaining height and giving views across Caernarfonshire towards Caernarfon and Anglesey. Beyond Tryfan Junction, the route climbs eastward along the valley of the Afon Gwyfai to Waunfawr. Phase 2 was reconstructed in under twelve months and reopened to Waunfawr on 15 September 2000 at a cost of approximately £2 million. It had been hoped that this section would open in May but a particularly wet winter severely delayed construction work.

It had not been possible to start construction work on phase 2 immediately. First, the grant of a Transport and Works Order permitting the reconstruction from Dinas to Porthmadog was required and this involved a second public inquiry and then a long wait for a decision by the deputy prime minister, which resulted in the grant of The Welsh Highland Railway Order 1999, made on 30 June 1999 and which came into force on 21 July 1999. Only then could contracts be let and start dates agreed.

Unlike phase 1, a main civil engineering contractor was not employed. All construction work for phase 2 was carried out by Welsh Highland Light Railway Ltd as the main contractor with civil engineering work being undertaken by local North Wales based civil engineering contractors. Four such contracts were granted. Unlike phase 1 where the trackbed was tidy and in use as a cycletrack and footpath, the first contract let for phase 2 involved site clearance and fencing of the four-mile (6 km) route and this was let to Achnashean Contractors Ltd, of Llandygai. Significant bridge reconstruction work was needed for six overbridges, two underbridges and many drainage channels and culverts. The rebuilding of one of the underbridges was undertaken largely by volunteers. Two contracts were let for the other bridge and culvert works. In the event, both were awarded to Mulcair Ltd of Caernarfon. A major contract for the reconstruction and ballasting the trackbed was let to Jones Bros Ruthin (Civil Engineering) Co Ltd. In addition, a firm of Colwyn Bay consulting engineers, Symonds Group Ltd, was employed with a resident civil engineer based at Dinas, acting as a link between WHLR Ltd and the outside contractors, and ensuring smooth running of the contracts.

Tracklaying on phase 2, as on phase 1 was undertaken by Welsh Highland Light Railway Ltd using Ffestiniog and Welsh Highland Railway staff and volunteers including, notably, the Welsh Highland Railway Society North Wales Group track gang who laid the first mainline section in April 2000. The rails, sleepers and fastenings again came mostly from South Africa where they had been first used on the lifted Umzinto-Donnybrook line. The entire four-mile (6 km) tracklaying was completed in under six months.

The intermediate station at Tryfan Junction was not re-opened until 2010. The derelict station building was carefully surveyed and tidied to industrial archaeology standards by the Welsh Highland Heritage Group and secured for rebuilding, which was undertaken in 2011. Tryfan was the junction with the branch line to Rhostryfan and Bryngwyn. At Bryngwyn, a 1-in-10 balanced inclined plane owned by the Welsh Highland Railway led to an upper plateau from where quarry owned lines radiated to several slate quarries in the Moel Tryfan and Nantlle area. Although slate traffic continued as required until final closure in the 1930s, passenger trains ceased to operate on the branch in 1916. The branch has become a public footpath, with considerable help from Llanwnda Community Council.

The station at Waunfawr was opened in part-completed form, with only one platform face completed: the footbridge which connects it to the car park (shared with The Snowdonia Park Hotel) was not completed until September of the following year. Completion of works on the "snagging list" meant that final approval from HM Railway Inspectorate was not received until 21 September 2001, marking the formal completion of Phase 2. The remainder of the station platform was completed the next year, but station shelters were not erected until 2010.

A new station building, in traditional NWNGR style, was being built on the Waunfawr platform in 2018–19, on foundations provided in 2003. The same architect designed the new Caernarfon Station in a greatly contrasted design!

=== Phase 3: Waunfawr to Rhyd Ddu ===
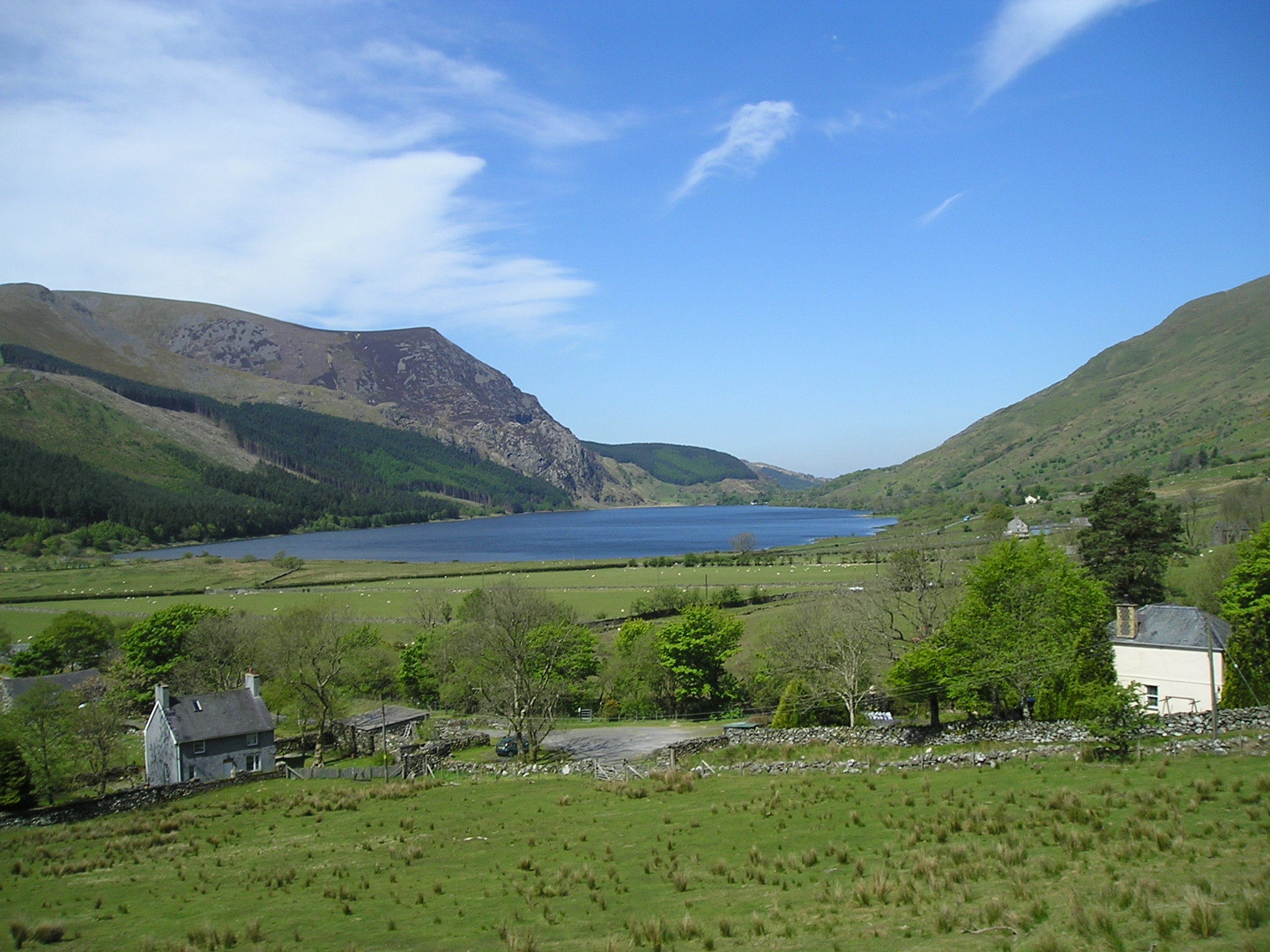
Llyn Cwellyn viewed from the Welsh Highland Railway

The line from Waunfawr to Rhyd Ddu climbs the steep valley of the Afon Gwyrfai, past Llyn Cwellyn all the way to its source in Llyn y Gader. It was the final and most scenic section of the North Wales Narrow Gauge Railways Moel Tryfan Undertaking to be built, originally opened throughout in 1881. It was re-opened for public passenger service on 18 August 2003.

For Phase 3, the Ffestiniog Railway's subsidiary engineering company Welsh Highland Light Railway Ltd was the main contractor, but with its managing director, Roland Doyle, acting as Resident Engineer on site. Posford Duvivier (Caernarfon office) were retained as civil engineering consultants and supervisors for the specialist contractors, principally Jones Bros. Ruthin (Civil Engineering) Co Ltd. All tracklaying for the six miles (10 km) of railway was again undertaken by direct labour with significant volunteer involvement but in addition direct labour and volunteers undertook the formation construction, ballasting and drainage work on almost half the length of trackbed. There were eight major bridge contracts:

- Three were NWNGR road overbridges requiring significant lowering of the trackbed (including two under the A4085 at Betws Garmon and Castell Cidwm).
- A new overbridge was needed to provide caravan access to the Bryn Gloch caravan park.
- Three existing river underbridges (over the Afon Gwyrfai) between Betws Garmon and Plas-y-Nant were not strong enough for further use. The bridge at Betws Garmon was completely replaced; the other two at Cae Hywel and Plas-y-Nant were refurbished and strengthened, and
- The spectacular Glan yr Afon bridge of almost 100 ft span was strengthened and fully refurbished.

Track supplies for Phase 3 were also obtained from South Africa and, including some existing stocks, the following were needed: Over 15,000 ex Donnybrook steel sleepers with rail fastening kits and about 12 miles (19 km) of new rail, which was rolled in South Africa to the same pattern as the Donnybrook rail (30 kg per metre, in 18-metre lengths). Owing to mishandling by the shippers in South Africa however, about half the rail was bent on arrival and had to be re-rolled in England at the expense of the South African shippers or their insurers.

Railway work in the Snowdonia National Park was subject to certain restrictions and in particular was not able to commence until rock stabilisation work in the Aberglaslyn Pass was completed to the satisfaction of the Snowdonia National Park Authority. This work included the raising of an existing retaining wall to reduce the risk of rockfall onto the line and other work including rockbolting within two of the three tunnels. This contract, with a value of about £200,000 was undertaken by Colin Jones (Rock Engineering) Ltd of Porthmadog, specialists in this field. Consultants in this field Ove Arup and Partners, who surveyed Aberglaslyn during the Transport & Works approval process, oversaw these remedial works which started in November 2000 and were completed during March 2001.

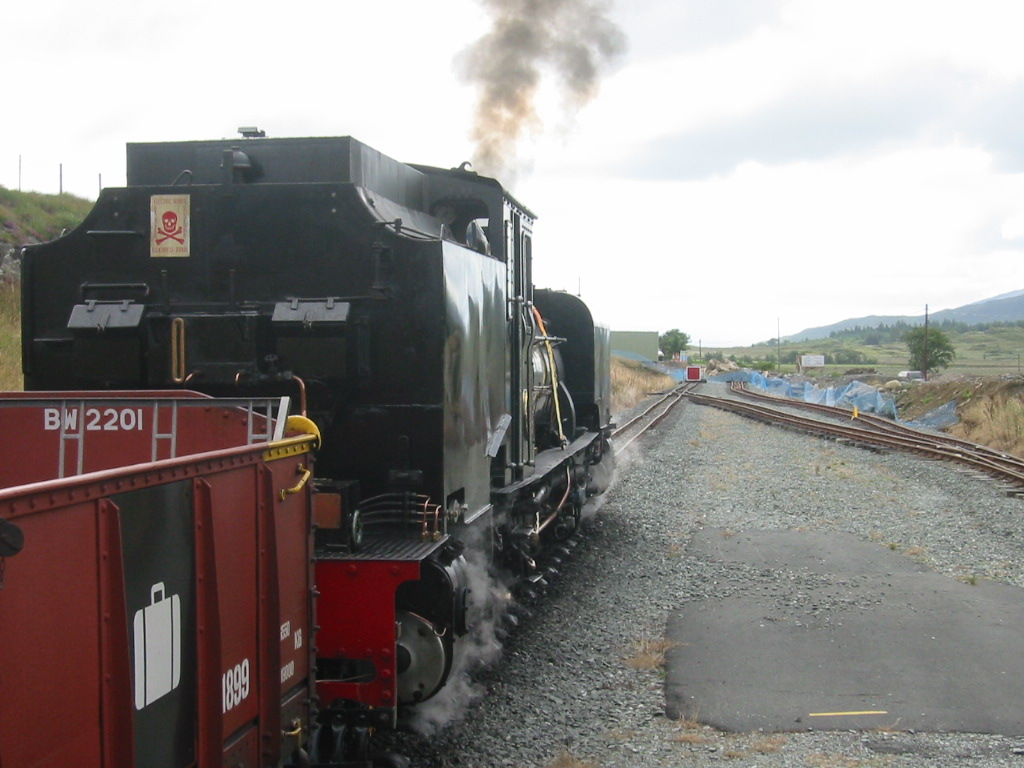
SAR NGG 16 Class Garratt 143 pictured at the temporary end of the line in autumn 2005. The red board marks the end of Phase 3, with the first phase 4 works visible beyond.

The line runs south from Waunfawr to Betws Garmon, where reconstruction started in October 2000. Tracklaying started in early 2001 south from Waunfawr and met track being laid north from Betws Garmon in May 2001. This was the only section on which work was permitted until the Aberglaslyn works were completed and this coincided with a major outbreak of foot and mouth disease, with cases in Anglesey resulting in movement restrictions throughout North Wales and delaying most of the railway works for several months.

The original Betws Garmon station was some distance from the straggling village of that name. It had sidings and short branch lines serving local quarries. One such line crossed the road and ran to Hafod-y-Wern slate quarry (closed mid-1920s). More recently, this quarry has supplied crushed slate waste used to consolidate the WHR track foundations prior to ballasting.

South of Betws Garmon, a new bridge was needed across Afon Gwyrfai. A secondhand British Railways bridge was acquired and altered to fit the 70 ft (21m) span of the river. This took time, so while the bridge was being built, railway tracks were laid northward from Rhyd Ddu.

Further south, there is a new halt at Plas-y-Nant (opened in 2005), which is actually more conveniently situated for Betws Garmon village than the original station. During reconstruction this was the site of a track materials depot and siding (now removed). Further south again, the halt at Snowdon Ranger marks the start of one of the paths to the summit of Snowdon.

Tracklaying north from Rhyd Ddu station started in May 2001, with an engineering base established there. The station itself was constructed in 2003, although it was much modified in 2005/6 as part of the Phase 4 works. The first steam train to operate over Phase 3 ran from Waunfawr to Plas-y-Nant on 26 July 2003 and then through to Rhyd Ddu on 28 July. In all, a total of 28 test trains were run in July and August 2003 to meet HMRI requirements.

Phase 3 was officially opened by The Prince of Wales on 30 July 2003 when a 'Royal Train' comprising three coaches hauled by the Ffestiniog Railway locomotive No. 2 'Prince' ran from Waunfawr to Rhyd Ddu carrying Prince Charles and about 100 invited guests. The Prince travelled in the replica North Wales Narrow Gauge Railways Carriage No. 24 from Waunfawr to Snowdon Ranger and from there to Rhyd Ddu he rode on the footplate of 'Prince'.

However, the first public passenger trains from Caernarfon for Rhyd Ddu did not run until 18 August 2003. One of the invited guests on the first train that day was Mr. Richard Williams, who had travelled on the original Welsh Highland Railway opening train in 1923: 80 years later, the WHR was open to Rhyd Ddu again.

=== Phase 4: Rhyd Ddu to Porthmadog ===
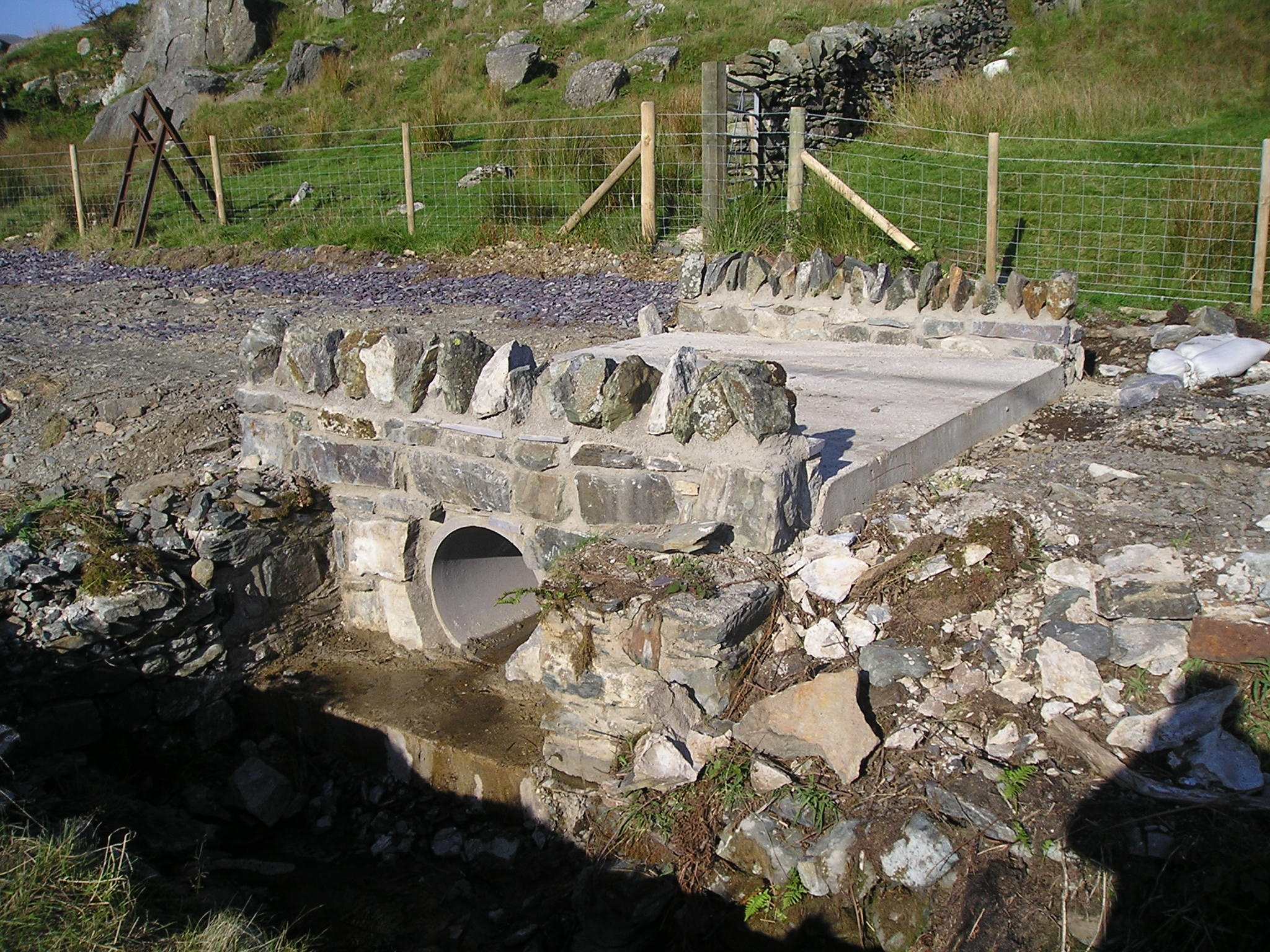
Attention to detail: storm culvert under track between Rhyd Ddu and Pitt's Head, rebuilt in October 2005

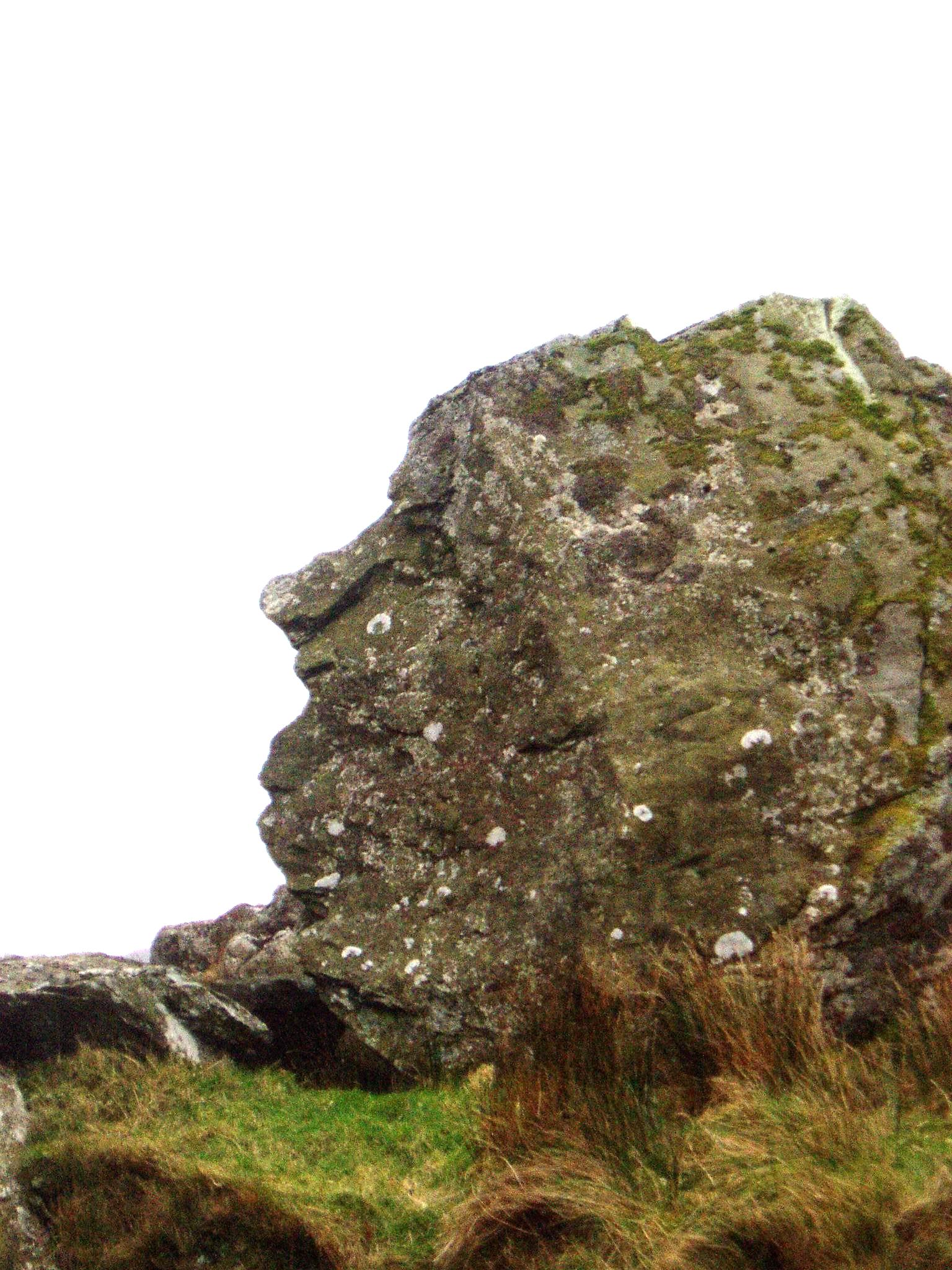
Pitts Head - the rock itself

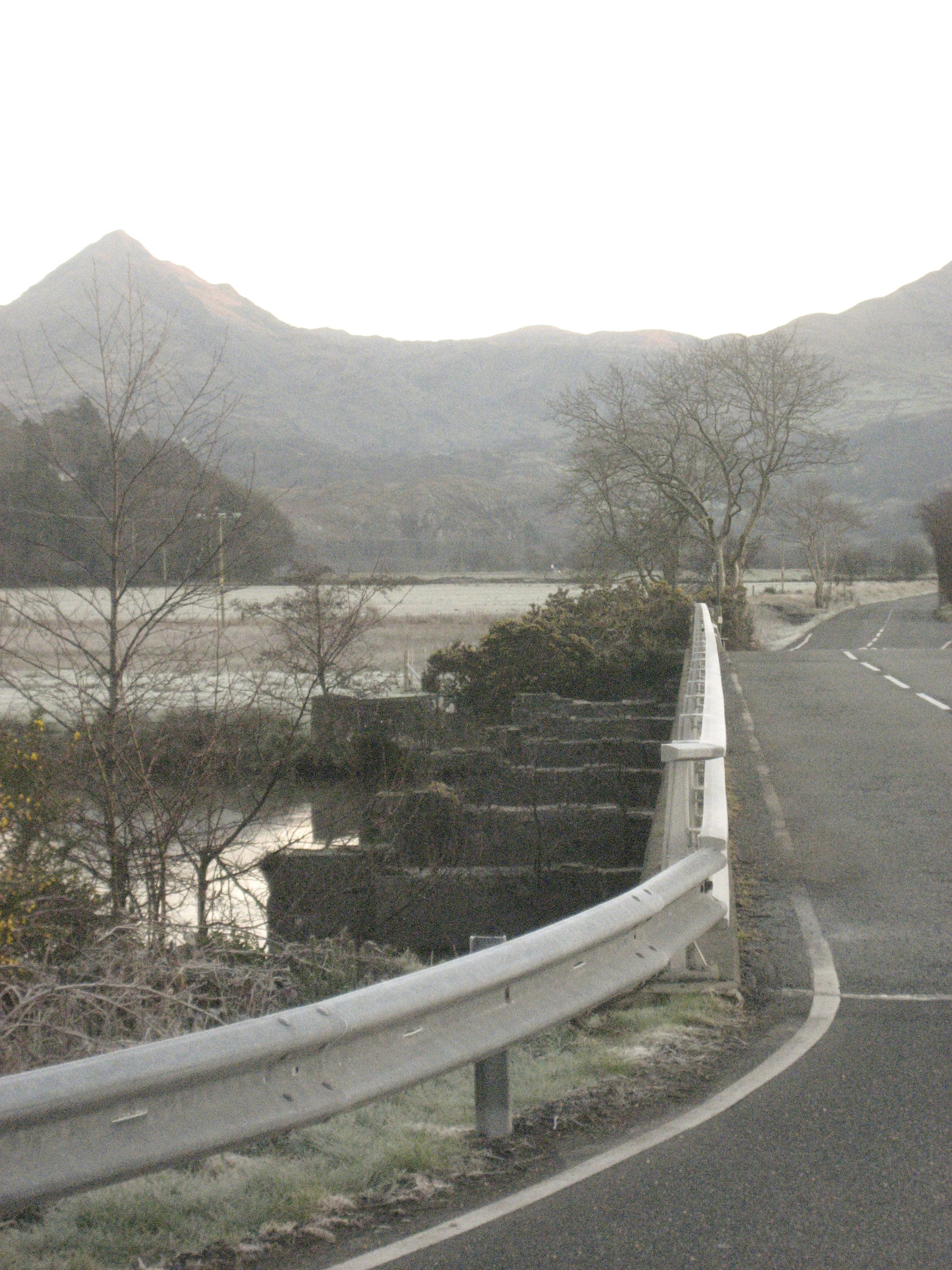
Pont Croesor bridge before reconstruction, with remains of the original Welsh Highland Railway bridge on the left

A ceremony to launch the start of Phase 4 construction took place at the south end of Rhyd Ddu station site on 1 August 2005, with a ribbon cut by the Rt Hon Rhodri Morgan AM, First Minister of the Welsh Assembly Government. This provides the link from Rhyd Ddu to Porthmadog and link into both the WHR Ltd and the Ffestiniog Railway at Porthmadog Harbour. The section of the line to Beddgelert passes Pitt's Head, at 650 ft the highest point on the route, and down at a gradient of 1 in 40 (2.5%) into the forest. The railway rapidly loses height through two S-bends, between which is the new Meillionen (= clover) Forest Camp Site Halt and below which is the new station at Beddgelert.

From Beddgelert, the line passes over the new Bryn-y-Felin bridge installed in summer 2006 over the River Glaslyn then along the Aberglaslyn Pass through the tunnels towards Nantmor. This section caused controversy in 1995 and 1996, when the land was taken back by the railway. Walkers and environmentalists claimed that an important, albeit unofficial footpath would be lost, but there was no real justification for this given that the Fisherman's Path remains usable alongside the railway trackbed. Further claims were made, that danger from falling rocks would make the pass unsafe for trains, which led to extensive remedial works to overhanging rocks, retaining walls and paths.

The footpath along the Aberglaslyn Pass trackbed was closed to walkers in 2000 to prepare for the rebuilding of the railway. This closure was perhaps precipitated by the death of a cyclist who foolishly tried to ride across the decrepit former railway bridge (of 1922) over the A4085 below Nantmor. The railway company, along with the National Trust, which owns the surrounding land, worked to rebuild the Fisherman's Path for use again. This now provides a popular, if occasionally tricky, footpath from which wayfarers wave at the train. It is not suitable for cycles.

South of the Aberglaslyn Pass, there is a halt at Nantmor, after which the railway passes over the new A4085 Nantmor road bridge before descending the 'ski-jump' and passing Hafod-y-Llyn loop. The gradient of 1 in 40 (2.5%) ends here: uphill, it is one of the stiffest and, for train crew, exhilarating tests of locomotive performance in Britain. Further southwards, the line leaves the Snowdonia National Park, passing the nest of the famous Glaslyn Ospreys. These enormous birds, with a wing-span of five feet (1500mm), may be seen in the summer carrying fish back to their nest. Just south of here, the line joins the formation of the Croesor Tramway, a quarry railway which had originally been taken over by the WHR in 1922. After an almost straight run of two miles, the train calls at Pont Croesor, where is the RSPB Glaslyn Osprey Project observation hide.

At a point along the level Croesor Tramway, the WHR(C) construction work met the WHR Ltd work, which had been extended north 700m to meet it. At Pen y Mount, the line divides into two, with one line branching to the WHR Ltd terminus – called Porthmadog (WHR) – and the main line continuing to the Ffestiniog Railway's Porthmadog Harbour Station. In the event the WHR Ltd ran trains, from a temporary terminus north of Pen y Mount called Traeth Mawr, to Porthmadog (WHR) during 2007 and 2008, after which the Traeth Mawr to Pen-y-Mount section became part of the Caernarfon to Porthmadog line.

The Welsh Highland Heritage Railway route to Porthmadog (WHR) station, currently in operation, passes Gelerts Farm Works, the main engineering base of the WHR Ltd and location of its WHR/FR Museum, before continuing to curve round and terminate parallel to the Network Rail Cambrian Coast Line close to the standard gauge Porthmadog station.

The section of the route from Pen-y-Mount to Porthmadog Harbour is known as the "Cross Town Rail Link" or CTRL, (a play on the initials of the Channel Tunnel Rail Link being built about the same time) which runs through a short section of Porthmadog Town Centre. South of Pen-y-Mount, it runs to the east side of Gelert's Farm Works, before crossing the Network Rail Cambrian Coast Line over a flat crossing, which was installed in November 2006; this is the only level crossing between standard and narrow gauge railways in Britain. After skirting the edge of one of Porthmadog's main town centre car parks, the line goes along the main street across the Britannia Bridge over Afon Glaslyn at Porthmadog Harbour, before entering the Ffestiniog Railway's Porthmadog Harbour station. The junction allows through trains to run from Caernarfon to Porthmadog - and then to Blaenau Ffestiniog, creating the longest narrow-gauge railway in the UK.

Trackwork supplies for phase 4 of the new line, after small quantities of South African rail, sleepers and fittings had been used up, were obtained from EU member state Poland. The entire order, signed on 1 August 2005, for 1,300 tons of rail, was delivered during 2005 and some was sent direct to WHR Ltd for use between Pen-y-Mount and Traeth Mawr Loop. The sleeper order comprised just over 21,000 steel sleepers and 84,000 elastic rail clips similar to the type manufactured by Pandrol. This was enough to complete the railway - though timber sleepers fitted with steel baseplates are used at stations and in various other places. These were all delivered in 2005.

Following initial trial tracklaying with the new materials and experience with spring clips recently gained by the Welshpool and Llanfair Light Railway, all Phase 4 track was to be laid in 30 kg/m (60 lb/yd) rail in lengths of 18 m (60 ft) and pressed steel sleepers with specially made 3 mm thick plastic pads between the sleepers and the rails. The trackwork was built by volunteers, supplemented by the Railway's own staff who maintain it. The normal track gauge of 1 ft 11 1/2 in (597 mm) is widened to as much as 610 mm (2 ft) on sharp curves, of which there are many, including two large S-bends in the hills above Beddgelert. The sharpest curves are at either end of Glanrafon Bridge, between Beddgelert and Aberglaslyn, and lastly on the curve onto Britannia Bridge. The sharpest curves are 50m radius with 60m transitions; the sharpest curve on the FR main line is 40m radius.

Although the railway was mostly complete to Beddgelert in 2007, the Snowdonia National Park Authority stipulated that the station could not be used as a temporary terminus until the track had been laid beyond Ynys Ferlas, the Railway's southern limit in the National Park. As a result, the Railway lost the income for a year's opening to Beddgelert in 2008. Although by the end of 2008 tracklaying had reached Porthmadog Harbour, and the crossing of Britannia Bridge to complete the entire run from Caernarfon on 2 February 2009, it was announced that, due to delays for financial reasons in letting final commissioning contracts, completion would be delayed, the line opening to Beddgelert on 7 April 2009 and to a temporary terminus at Hafod y Llyn (about a mile south of Nantmor) on 21 May 2009.

Extension of passenger trains through to Porthmadog was originally expected following the 2009 summer peak season but in the event trains were extended as far as Pont Croesor in late May 2010 and passenger trains finally ran through to Porthmadog in February 2011. In the winter of 2011–12, the station site at Porthmadog Harbour was extended seawards to make room for independent working of the two railways and so that passengers could have a cross-platform exchange from FR to RhE or vice versa.
