= Nant Gwynant =

Valley in Beddgelert, Gwynedd, Wales

Coordinates: 53.0374°N 4.0471°W

Nant Gwynant (also spelt Nantgwynant) is a valley in northern Wales. The A498 road descends 600 feet (180 m) into the valley in about two miles (3 km) from Pen-y-Gwryd; it follows the Nant Cynnyd, the Afon Glaslyn and alongside Llyn Gwynant, then beside the Nant Gwynant river to Llyn Dinas and passing below Dinas Emrys to Beddgelert. The road continues through the Aberglaslyn Pass to Porthmadog.

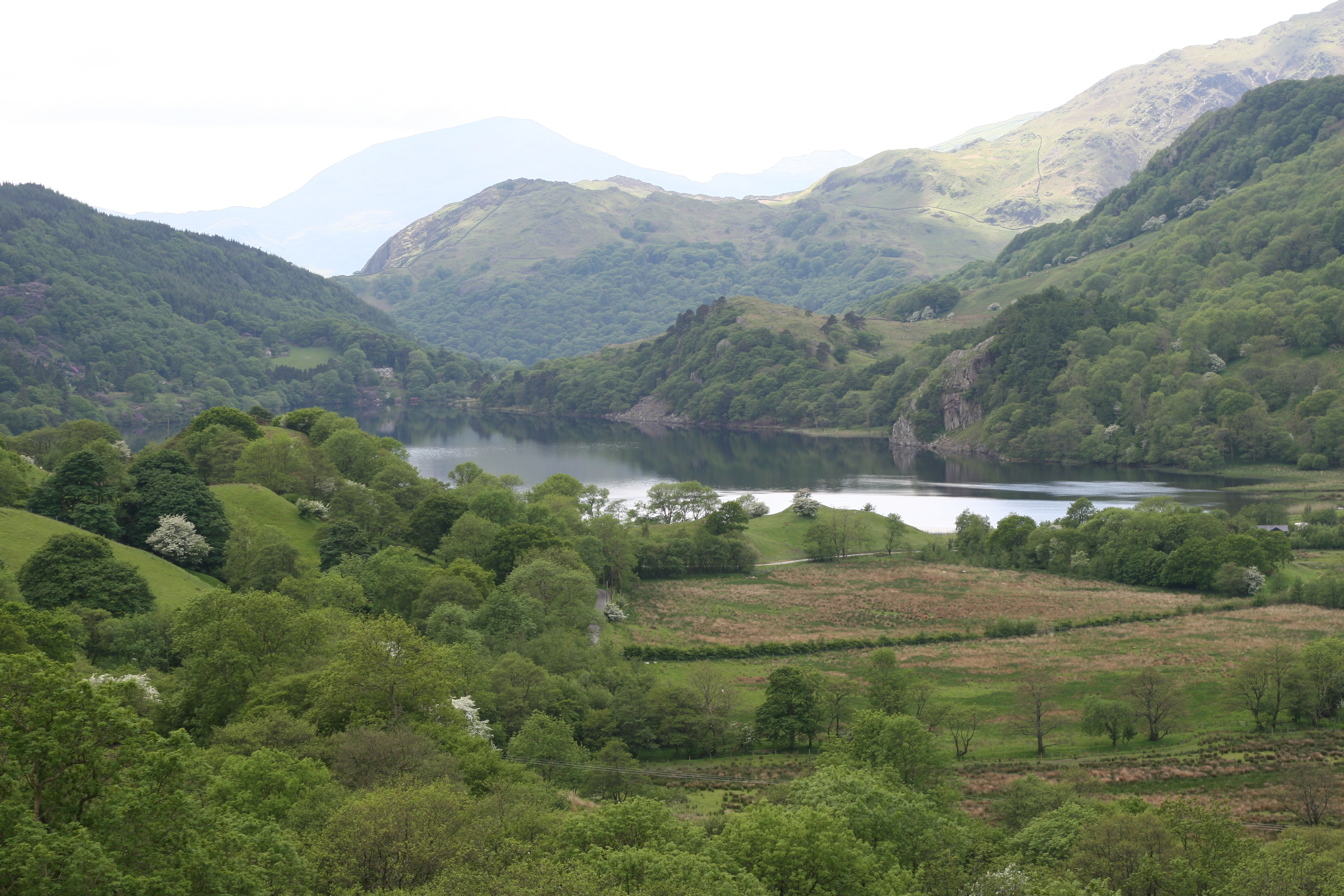
Nant Gwynant, looking south; Llyn Gwynant centre.

== History and geography ==
=== Early references ===
The earliest contemporary reference to a route down the valley comes from John Leland, antiquarian to King Henry VIII, who travelled to Wales in 1538. In describing Nant Gwynant, he wrote: "The trees were so thick that a man on a white horse could not be seen from Llyn y Dinas to Pen y Gwryd." In 1802 Williams Williams described it as “a road, or rather a mere right of passage”. He continued: "Through this charming valley, like all other mountainous unimproved roads, the road is very bad, circuitous, and winding, and absolutely impassable when the floods are violent after a fall of rain ..." Soon afterwards it was improved, and in 1808 George Nicholson wrote: "A new turnpike-road is completed to Beddgellart. This drive exhibits a wonderful variety of sublime scenery. The new road is excellent, and conveys the traveller amid Snowdonia along the banks of several beautiful lakes."

=== Upper section ===
The upper section of Nant Gwynant, from the site of the Roman fort and marching camp situated at the junction with the modern A4086 Caernarfon to Capel Curig road, follows the valley of Nant Cynnyd to a viewpoint (in about a mile) overlooking the Cwm Dyli hydro-electric power station, which was built in 1899/1900 by the North Wales Power and Traction Company to supply electricity to the Porthmadog, Beddgelert and South Snowdon Railway that failed before it was completed. The power station however still uses the waters of Llyn Llydaw to generate electricity for the National Grid (UK).

=== Hafod Lwyfog ===
A mile further and the road passes Hafod Lwyfog, the summer homestead built in the 1540s, the birthplace of Sir John Williams, goldsmith to King James I, who in 1610 presented the Church of St Mary in Beddgelert with a fine chalice. In 1938, the then owner, Clough Williams-Ellis presented part of the Hafod Lwyfog land to the National Trust in anticipation of the establishment of the Snowdonia National Park. A campsite now operates at the head of Llyn Gwynant, and the balance of the farm is managed as a conservation estate by descendants of Sir Clough Williams-Ellis.

=== Hafod-y-Llan and the Watkin Path ===
Between the two lakes is Hafod-y-Llan (bought by the National Trust in 1998) with the Watkin Path climbing above Afon Cwm Llan to the summit of Snowdon. The path passes through South Snowdon Quarry, which was later the intended destination of that never completed narrow gauge railway from Porthmadog. The path, which was ceremonially opened on 13 September 1892 by William Ewart Gladstone, the then Prime Minister, was specially constructed for Sir Edward Watkin, railway entrepreneur and Victorian pioneer of the Channel Tunnel for the benefit of guests at The Chalet, his summer retirement home in the woods.

=== Craflwyn ===
Another National Trust property in the valley is Craflwyn. It stands below the hill of Dinas Emrys to which according to tradition, in retreat with his adviser Myrddin Emrys, came an unhappy Vortigern, the Romano-British King who first encountered the Anglo Saxon immigrants. The house is not listed but the gardens are designated Grade II on the Cadw/ICOMOS Register of Parks and Gardens of Special Historic Interest in Wales.

=== Bryn Gwynant ===
Bryn Gwynant is a Victorian country house which operates as a youth hostel. The house is not listed, but its gardens are listed at Grade II on the Cadw/ICOMOS register.

== Recreation ==
Llyn Gwynant is used, like many lakes in north Wales, as a watersports facility by local education authorities. Access to the water is provided from the roadside lay-bys.

At the eastern end of the valley is a crag called Clogwyn y Wenallt which has some steep climbing routes, one of which is 'Lockwoods Chimney'; this is named after Arthur Lockwood, who was the tenant, then owner of Pen-y-Gwryd hotel (one mile further up the valley) from 1909 to 1945.

There is a lakeside campsite at the north east end of Llyn Gwynant. The National Trust also has a campsite at Hafod y Llan.
