= Afon Colwyn =

River in Gwynedd, Wales

Coordinates: 53.080°N 4.082°W

Afon Colwyn (Welsh for 'river Colwyn') is a small river in Gwynedd, north-west Wales, a tributary of the Afon Glaslyn.

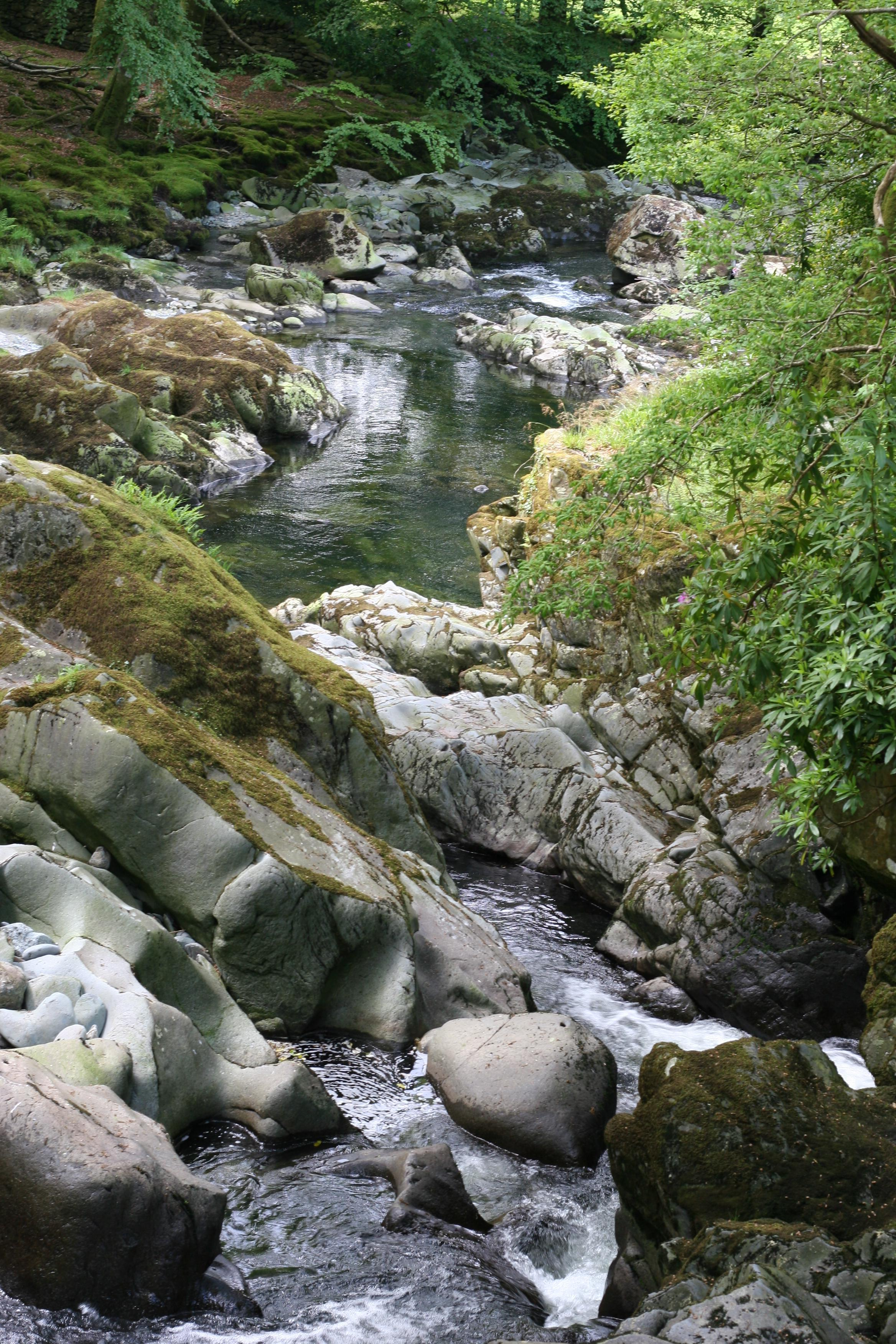
The River Colwyn above Beddgelert

It has its source on the south-western flank of Yr Aran, near Snowdon. It first flows west to cross the A4085 Caernarfon to Beddgelert road at Pont Cae Gors just south of Rhyd Ddu, then flows south and then south-east parallel to the A4085 to Beddgelert. On the way it is joined by two tributaries, Afon Cwm-du and Afon Meillionen. At Beddgelert it joins the Glaslyn, to flow south to Tremadog Bay near Porthmadog.

The Colwyn is a short and fast-flowing river. It generally carries less water than the Glaslyn, but water levels can rise very rapidly when there is heavy rain. The river is popular with whitewater kayakers and anglers.

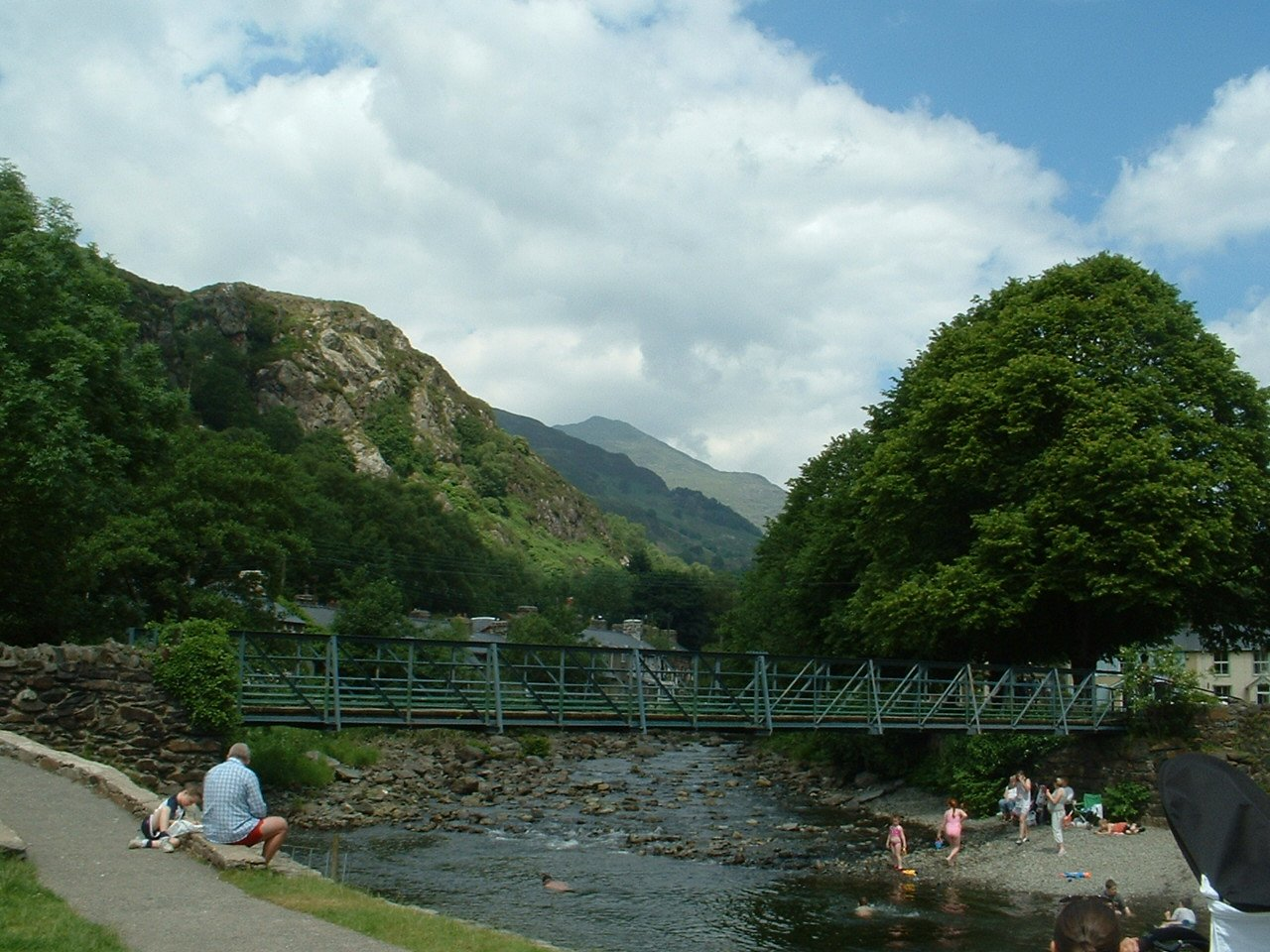
The confluence of the Colwyn (left) with the Glaslyn at Beddgelert
