= A498 road =

Road in Wales

A498

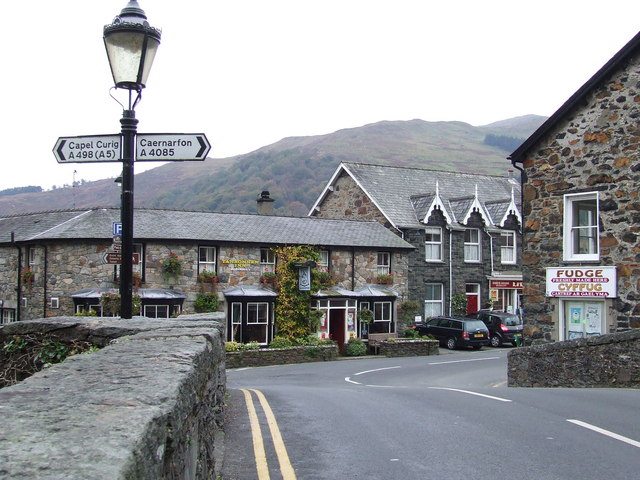
- The A498 at its junction with the A4085 in Beddgelert

Route information
- Length: 14.8 mi (23.8 km)

Major junctions
- north end: 53.0819°N 4.0022°W
- south end: 52.9336°N 4.1543°W

Location
- Country: United Kingdom
- Constituent country: Wales

Road network
- Roads in the United Kingdom; Motorways; A and B road zones

The A498 is a 16-mile road between Pen-y-Gwryd and Porthmadog in North Wales.

At Pen-y-Gwryd, the A4086 Llanberis Pass route bears off to the north. The A498 descends from a 277 m (909 ft.) summit at Pen-y-Gwryd and runs south west through the village of Beddgelert and the Aberglaslyn Pass, where it overlaps the A4085. The A498 then passes through Tremadog and crosses the A487 at a roundabout, before passing under the Cambrian Coast railway and terminating at Penamser on the A497 (52.9336°N 4.1543°W), about a mile west of Porthmadog. At its northern end, the road forms a link via the A4086 with the A5 at Capel Curig, forming a useful holiday route to the Beddgelert/Porthmadog area. At the junctions, the A4086 to Llanberis is the minor road at Pen-y-Gwryd, while the A498 is the minor road at Beddgelert. At Pont Aberglaslyn, the A4085 is the minor road diverging to Penrhyndeudraeth and at Tremadog, the A498 is the major road. The junction west of Tremadog is a roundabout and at Penamser, the A498 is the minor road.

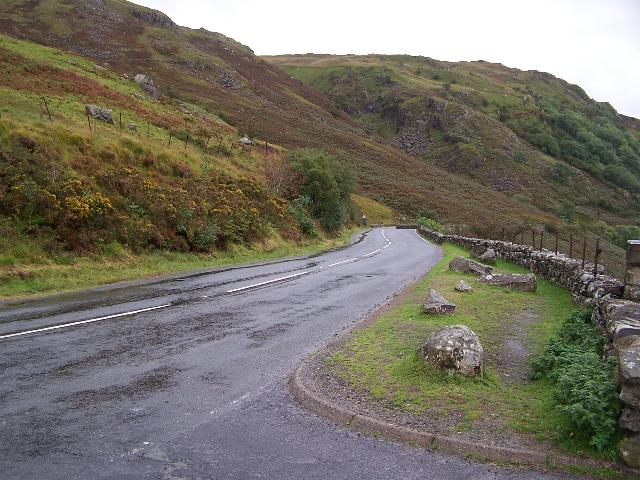
The A498 descends the Nant Gwynant Pass via a 1 3/4 miles section with limited width and poor alignment

There is a steep descent of Nantgwynant and some 1 3/4 miles of this is on a substandard, narrow twisting alignment, where larger vehicles have difficulty in passing. There are further substandard sections in the Aberglaslyn Pass and towards Tremadog and coaches have had difficulty passing in this section. The road passes through Beddgelert by way of a sharp right angled bend over a river bridge, not recommended for articulated vehicles. In the Aberglaslyn Pass the trackbed of the Welsh Highland Railway, now being reconstructed, can be seen on the opposite side of the Afon Glaslyn. At its west end, the route crosses the new A487 Porthmadog Bypass at a roundabout west of Tremadog.

== Recent improvements ==
In late 2008 the Bryn-y-felin road bridge was rebuilt over the Welsh Highland Railway as part of Gwynedd Council's WHR Bridges policy. Unfortunately the bridge was rebuilt with such narrow dimensions that vehicles wider than a standard car find it difficult to pass.

== History ==
The road was created from early toll roads. There was some improvement in the 1960s/70s in Nantgwynant and south of the Aberglaslyn Pass. Just south of the Goat Hotel in Beddgelert is an arched railway overbridge (with height and width restrictions) built by the Portmadoc, Beddgelert and South Snowdon Railway but never used.
