= 1952 Aer Lingus C-47 accident =

1952 plane crash in Wales

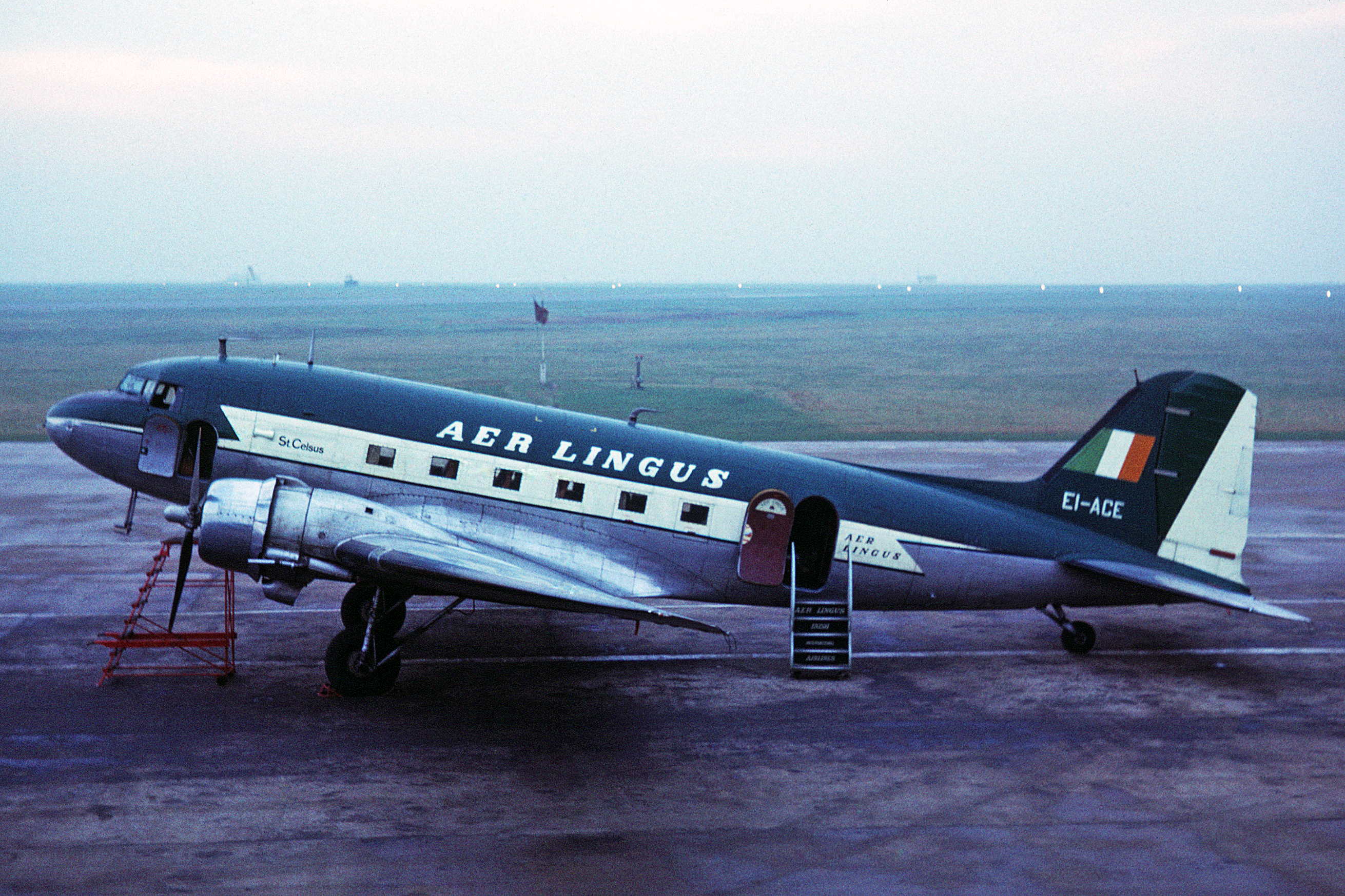
- An Aer Lingus Dakota similar to the accident aircraft

Accident
- Date: 10 January 1952
- Summary: Loss of control after being hit by a mountain wave
- Site: Cwm Edno, Near Llyn Gwynant, Snowdonia, Wales; 53°03′06″N 3°59′10″W

Aircraft
- Aircraft type: Douglas C-47B-35-DK Dakota 3
- Aircraft name: Saint Kevin
- Operator: Aer Lingus
- Registration: EI-AFL
- Flight origin: RAF Northolt, London, United Kingdom
- Destination: Dublin Airport, Republic of Ireland
- Occupants: 23
- Passengers: 20
- Crew: 3
- Fatalities: 23
- Survivors: 0

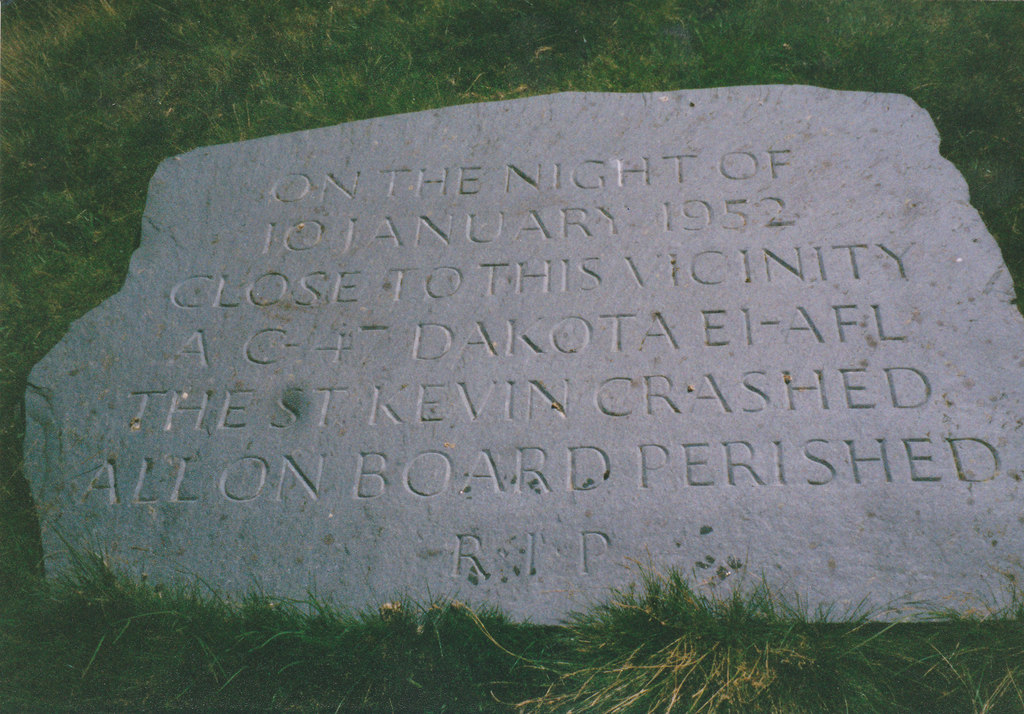
A memorial at the site of the January 1952 crash.

The 1952 Aer Lingus C-47 accident occurred on 10 January 1952, in Wales. The C-47 operated by Aer Lingus was en-route from Northolt Royal Air Force Station in London to Dublin when the aircraft suddenly went into a dive and crashed near Llyn Gwynant. All twenty passengers and three crew died in the crash. It was determined that the aircraft had flown into a mountain wave triggered by Snowdon massif, resulting in loss of control. To date, the accident is the second deadliest commercial airliner crash in Wales, the first fatal accident of Aer Lingus, and the second deadliest crash involving Aer Lingus.

== Accident ==
The flight departed Northolt Royal Air Force Station at 5:25 pm local time on 10 January 1952. As the flight overflew Daventry at 5:56, three minutes ahead of schedule, it checked in, and estimated that it would cross its next reporting point, three degrees west longitude, at 6:41, maintaining a consistent ground speed. At 6:38, the aircraft that it had cross three degrees west, and that its estimated arrival time at Dublin was 7:51. At 6:54, the aircraft requested permission to climb to 6,500 feet (2,000 m), and at 7:12 it reported its position over Nefyn, on the northwest coast of the Llŷn Peninsula, Gwynedd, Wales, and changed its radio frequency to Dublin. At some time between 7:12 and 7:15, the aircraft contacted Dublin air traffic control and requested a descent clearance, which was given.

At about 7:15 pm, the aircraft crashed into a peat bog about 1.5 miles (2.4 km) east of Llyn Gwynant in Snowdonia, Wales at an elevation of 1,200 feet (370 m) above sea level. The condition of the wreckage suggested that the aircraft struck the ground in a steep dive, heading north. The aircraft disintegrated and a fire occurred in the main impact crater.

== Investigation ==
Investigators concluded that the aircraft unknowingly deviated from its intended course and that the pilot thought he was over the Irish Sea when he was in fact in the vicinity of Snowdon mountain in North Wales. Since the aircraft's de-icing equipment had been switched on, the investigators concluded that the pilot had been motivated to descend to 4,500 feet (1,400 m) due to icing that the aircraft had been experiencing. As it descended, it encountered an unusually strong downdraft around Snowdon and the aircraft rapidly lost altitude to below the crests of the mountains in the area before the pilot could recover. At that low altitude, the aircraft experienced severe turbulence which buffeted the aircraft, broke off one of the wings, and caused the plane to crash.
