= Afon Meillionen =

River in Gwynedd, Wales

Coordinates: 53.02124°N 4.12322°W

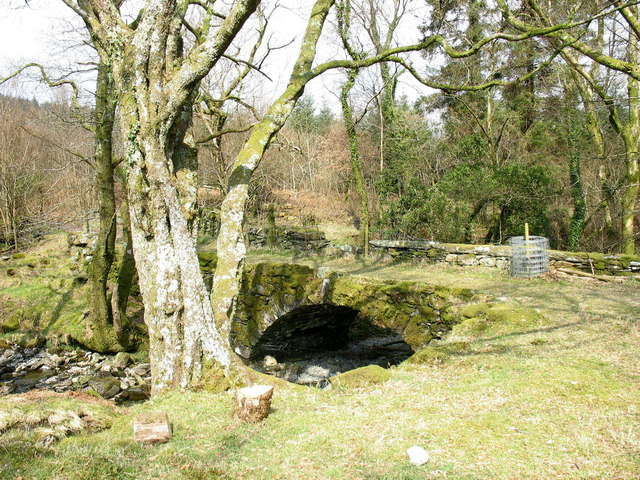
A bridge over Afon Meillionen

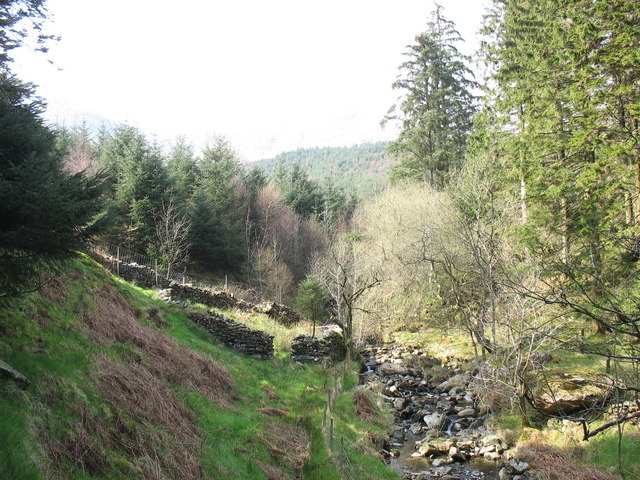
Afon Meillionen flowing through the steep sided and forested Cwm Meillionen

Afon Meillionen (Welsh for Clover River) is a small river near Beddgelert in Gwynedd, north-west Wales.

It flows down Cwm Meillionen, a small valley which lies on the north-eastern side of Moel yr Ogof (655m). Much of the river's catchment area lies within Beddgelert Forest. The first recorded use of the name Afon Meillionen being used to refer to the river was between 1898-1908.

Afon Meillionen is a tributary of the Afon Colwyn, which itself joins the Afon Glaslyn in the village of Beddgelert.

"Meillionen" is also the name of a farmhouse in the Cwm and of a small halt on the Welsh Highland Railway between Caernarfon and Porthmadog.
