= Meillionen railway station =

Railway station in Beddgelert, Wales

Meillionen
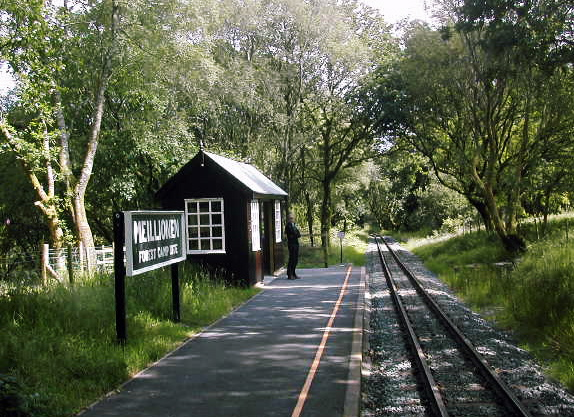

General information
- Location: Beddgelert, Gwynedd; Wales
- Coordinates: 53.01940°N 4.12353°W,
- Grid reference: SH576489
- System: Station on heritage railway
- Owner: Festiniog Railway Company
- Manager: Welsh Highland Railway
- Platforms: 1

Key dates
- 8 April 2009: Public opening
Location

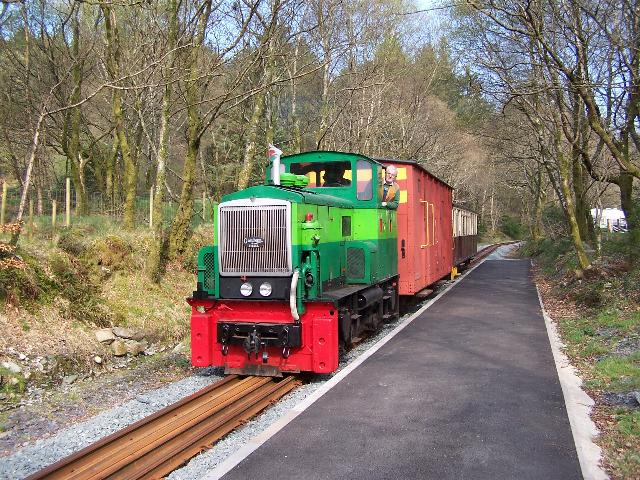
A northerly view of Beddgelert Forest Halt during construction.

Meillionen railway station is a halt on the Welsh Highland Railway. It opened to the public when the section of line between Rhyd Ddu and Beddgelert re-opened on 8 April 2009.

The station has been built to serve the popular the holiday cabins and campsite at Beddgelert, run by Forest Holidays. The railway provides a greener alternative to the car for visitors wishing to travel to Caernarfon, Porthmadog and, other points served in the Snowdonian National Park.

The name Meillionen derives from the Afon Meillionen (Welsh for Clover River) which runs under the railway a little to the north. Before completion, it was to be called Beddgelert Forest Halt but was renamed to comply with the company's policy of naming WHR halts in Welsh. After completion the halt's running in board, however, did have the sub-title Forest Camp Site. This subsequently changed in April 2018 and now displays the main title Meillionen only. Construction of the station started in 2006 and a waiting shelter was built in April 2009.

Preceding station	Heritage railways	Following station
Rhyd Ddu towards Caernarfon	Welsh Highland Railway	Beddgelert towards Porthmadog Harbour
