= John Williams (goldsmith) =

Welsh goldsmith (fl. 1584–1627?)

John Williams was a Welsh-born goldsmith based in London who worked for the British royal family.

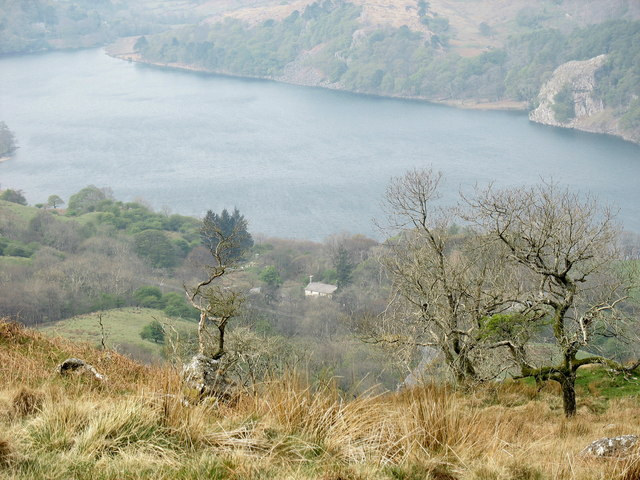
Hafod Lwfog in Nant Gwynant

== Background ==
He was a son of William Coetmor, and is associated with the property Hafod Lwyfog in Nant Gwynant near Beddgelert. In 1610 he donated a silver chalice and paten-cover to the church in Beddgelert. Williams is said to have founded a chapel at Nanwhynen.

== Career ==
Williams was an apprentice of the London goldsmith and Mayor Richard Martin in 1584. Martin supplied silver plate to Queen Elizabeth. By November 1598, he was working at the Sign of the Cross Keys in Cheapside.

Williams worked for James VI and I and Prince Henry. He provided silver gilt plate, cups and dishes, gold chains, and medallions with the king's portrait, many of which were given to ambassadors visiting London. Recipients of plate and medals bought from Williams between 1603 and 1606 include the Venetian diplomats Nicolò Molin and Scaramelli, and other diplomats including Andrew Sinclair, Christian Barnekow, Steen Brahe, Peder Munk, and Henrik Ramel. Anne of Denmark gave John Florio a cup of his making at his grandchild's christening.

Williams supplied the gilt plate given by King James to Adam Newton, the tutor of Prince Henry, in June 1605 when he married Katherine Puckering.

Williams provided Anne of Denmark with a "fountain of silver gilt, well chased, containing one basin with two tops, one of them being three satyres or wild men, the other a woman with a sail or flag". The fountain had three taps or cocks decorated with mermaids. It was used at Somerset House. The wild men were heraldic supporters of the Danish royal arms.

In September 1609, the Lord Chamberlain, Thomas Howard, 1st Earl of Suffolk, asked him to provide £2000 worth of plate to the Count Vaudemont.

Michael Drayton mentioned his friend John Williams in a preface to Poly-Olbion (London, 1612), addressed "to my Friends the Cambro-Britans".

In 1614 he made gilt plate given to Elizabeth Stuart, Queen of Bohemia at the baptism of her son Henry Frederick. He also made plate given to Jean Drummond on her marriage to Lord Roxburghe, to John Murray of the bedchamber, and Audrey Walsingham.

In September 1615, the Earl of Somerset sent plate to Williams to be exchanged and remade in expectation of the christening of his daughter Anne Carr. Somerset sent two Nuremberg basins and ewers as a pattern.

He loaned £5000 to King James in 1621 on the security of ten jewels from the royal collection. In 1624, Lionel Cranfield, 1st Earl of Middlesex pawned silver plate with Williams for his living expenses.

== Family ==
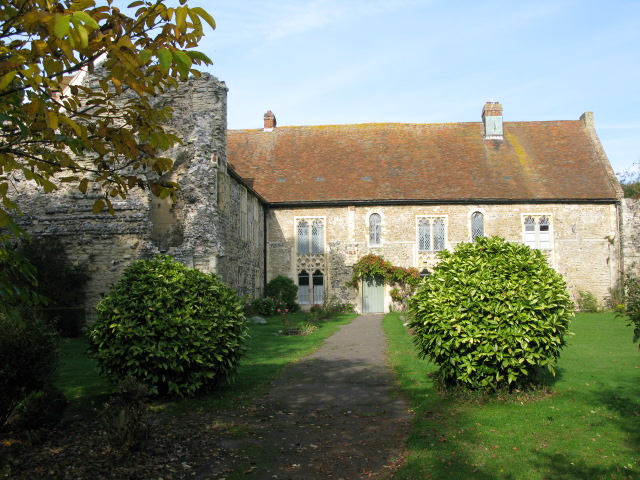
The goldsmith's son, John Williams, lived at Minster Court, Thanet

Sources disagree about his family of children and grandchildren. A son, also John Williams (d. 1637) was a London goldsmith, who later settled at Minster Court, Thanet. Other children include Sir Edmund Williams (died 1644) of Marnhull (a royal manor formerly in the jointure lands of Catherine Parr), Dorset, who married Mary Beaumont, and the royal physician Morris Williams.
