= Nant Cynnyd =

River in Gwynedd, Wales

Coordinates: 53.083°N 4.002°W

The Nant y Cynnyd is a small river in Gwynedd, north Wales, starting near the Pen-y-Gwryd hotel near Capel Curig. The Ordnance Survey map is not completely specific, but the river grows into Afon Glaslyn and into Llyn Gwynant.
