= Pont Aberglaslyn =

Stone bridge in Gwynedd, Wales

Coordinates: 52°59′42″N 4°05′45″W

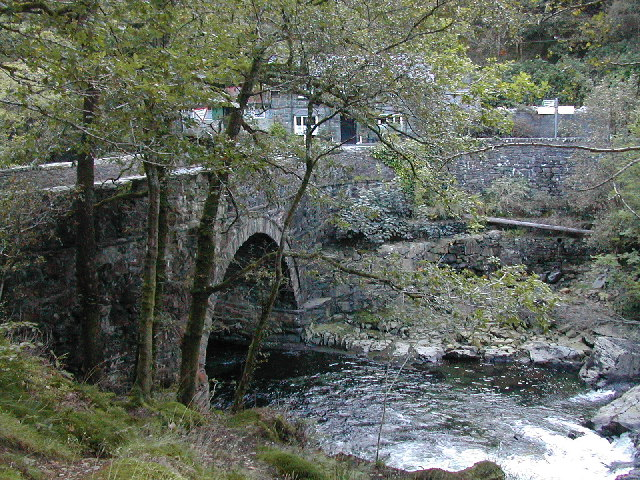
Pont Aberglaslyn viewed from the east along the A4085. Bridge House is visible in the background. In this picture upstream is to the right.

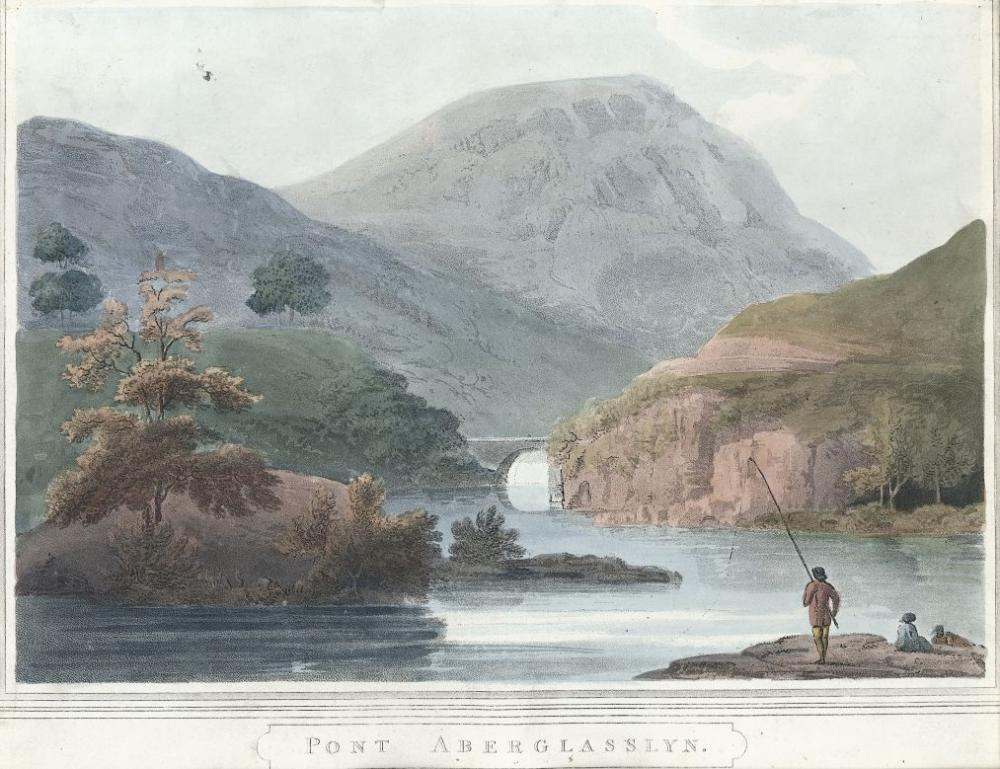
Pont Aberglaslyn looking upstream in an engraving from 1810.

Pont Aberglaslyn is a stone arch bridge over the Afon Glaslyn and the surrounding hamlet, located near Beddgelert and Nantmor in Gwynedd, north-west Wales. A well-known beauty spot, according to Peter Bishop it was "one of the most visited sites in north Wales" at the end of the eighteenth century; an 1883 guidebook wrote that it "has occupied the artist's pencil perhaps more than any other".

== Location ==
Pont Aberglaslyn is located near the downstream end of the Aberglaslyn Pass. While the location is rocky with the river running through rapids just upstream, it is not far above sea level. The river was tidal and navigable up to around Pont Aberglaslyn until the early nineteenth century, when the construction of the Cob seawall near Porthmadog prevented the tide from reaching it. Below the bridge is Llyn Glas (Blue Lake), a former harbour site used for loading copper mined nearby.

The bridge was formerly on the border between Caernarfonshire on the west side of the river and Merionethshire on the east. It is now the meeting-place of the A498 and A4085.

== Bridge ==
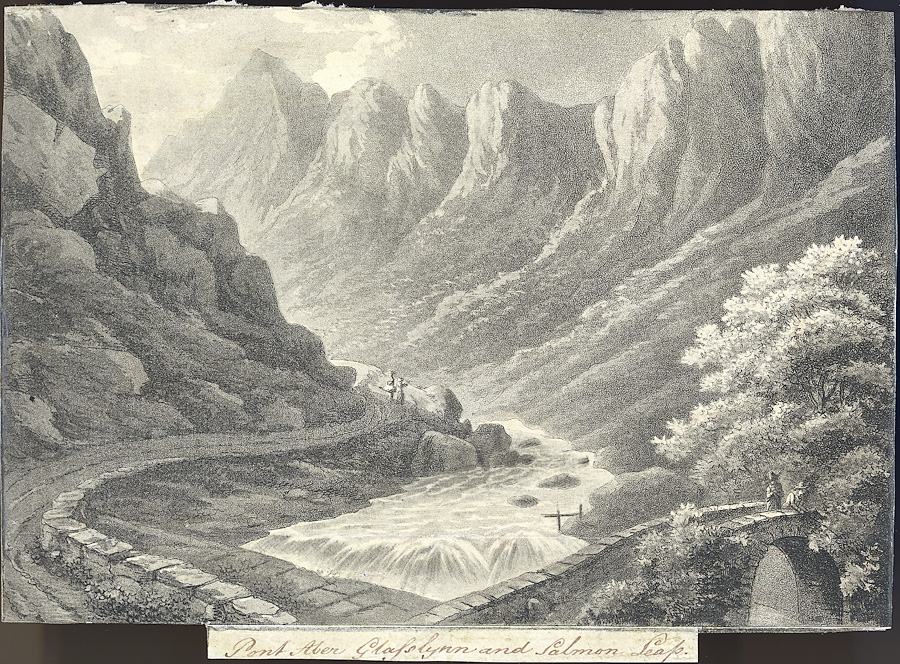
Engraving showing the falls upstream of Pont Aberglaslyn, once known as a salmon leap

The bridge was perhaps built in the 17th century, then extensively rebuilt and widened in 1795–6. It is Grade II listed. As with many older bridges, folklore had claimed that it was constructed by the Devil or by the Romans (described as "highly dubious" by a National Trust survey); a stone with the marking "W M 1656" scratched on it was found during reconstruction, suggesting that the bridge is at least this old. Another possibly medieval bridge spans a small stream that is a tributary of the Glasyn nearby.

Nearby is Bridge House (Ty Bont), a lodge for the nearby Aberglaslyn Hall estate. This is also listed at grade II.

Archaic spellings for the site included "Pont Abberglasslyn" and "Pont Abberglaslyn".
