= Llyn Gwynant =

Lake in Snowdonia, Wales

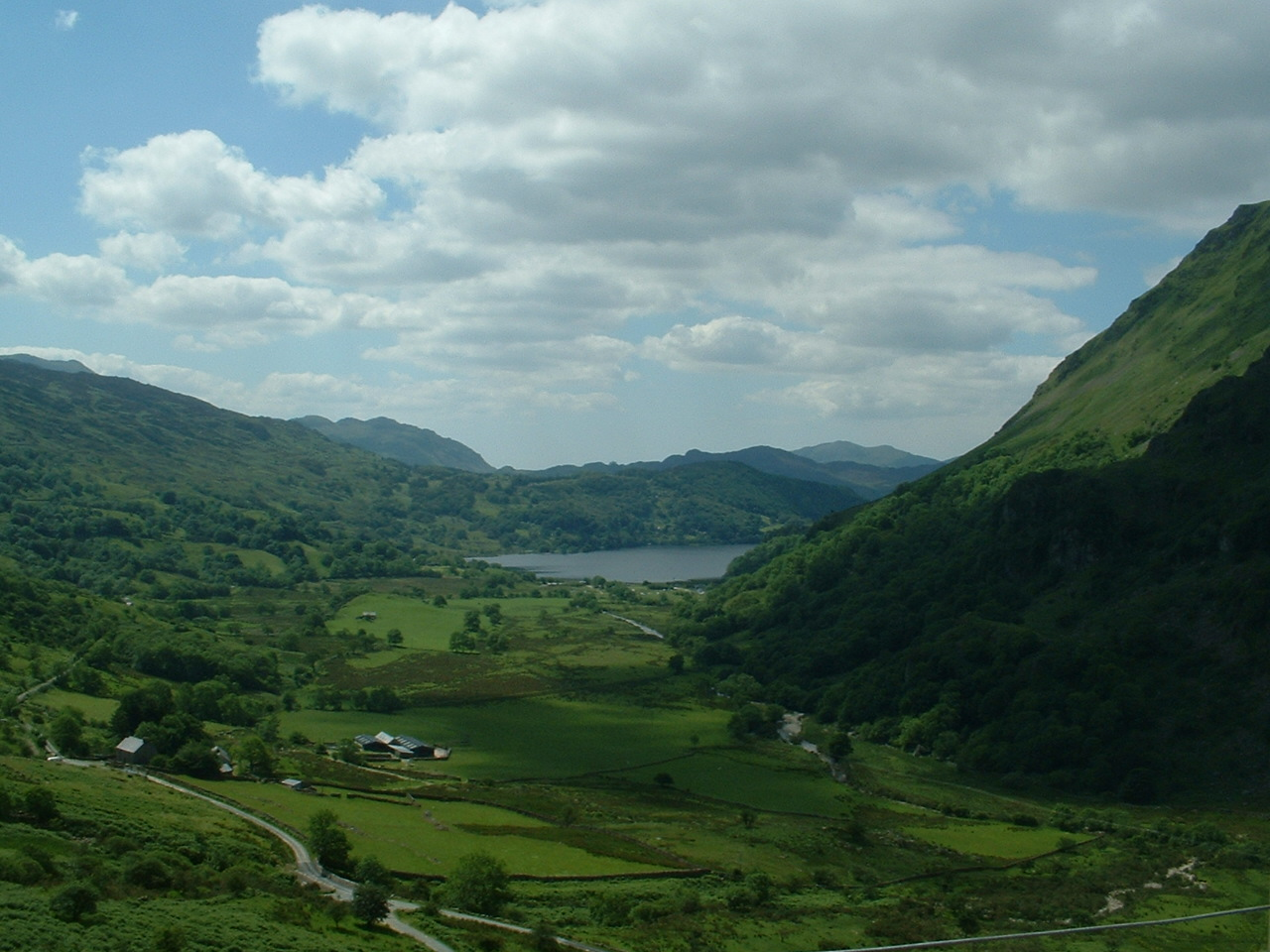
- Looking west down the pass towards Llyn Gwynant

- Location within Gwynedd
- Location: Snowdonia, Wales
- Coordinates: 53°03′N 4°02′W
- Type: natural
- Primary inflows: River Glaslyn
- Primary outflows: River Glaslyn
- Basin countries: United Kingdom
- Surface area: 50 ha (120 acres)

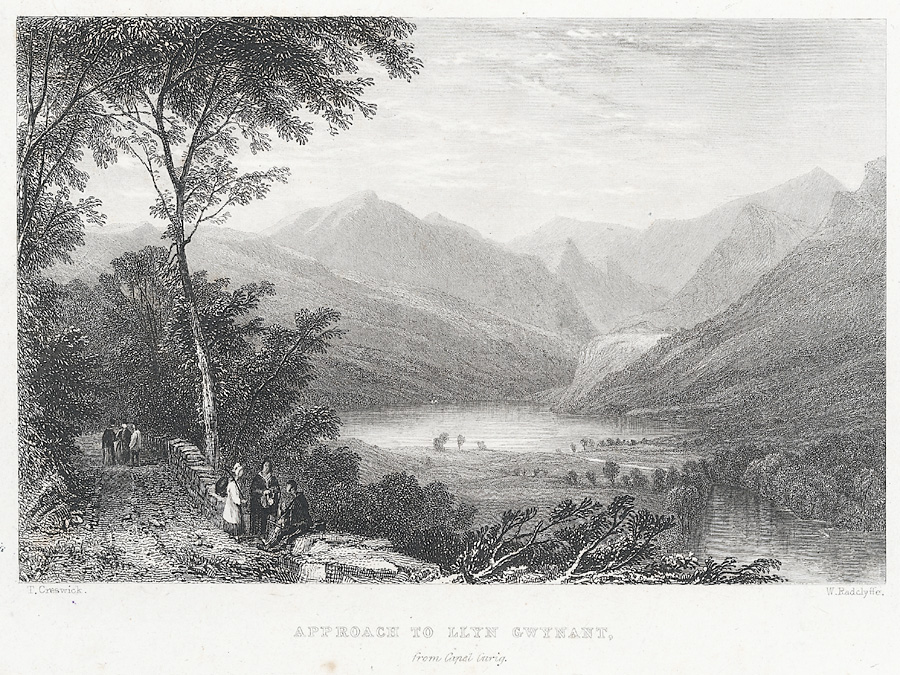
Approach to Llyn Gwynant, from Capel Curig, ca.1840

Llyn Gwynant is a lake in Snowdonia, Wales.

Llyn Gwynant lies on the River Glaslyn, in the Nant Gwynant valley, and is about 1¼ miles (2 km) north east of Llyn Dinas; the village of Bethania lies between them.

Snowdon lies 2 miles (3 km) to the north west. The lake is natural, having been formed by glacial action and is 120 acres (50 hectares) in size. It is a popular place for canoeing and kayaking with easy access from the A498 road which runs along its south bank.

It was used as a filming location in the 2003 film 'Lara Croft Tomb Raider: The Cradle of Life', and the 2022 film 'Brian and Charles'.

The view towards Llyn Gwynant and Moel Hebog is one of the most photographed in Snowdonia.
