= Dinas Emrys =

Iron Age hillfort in Gwynedd, Wales

- Hillock
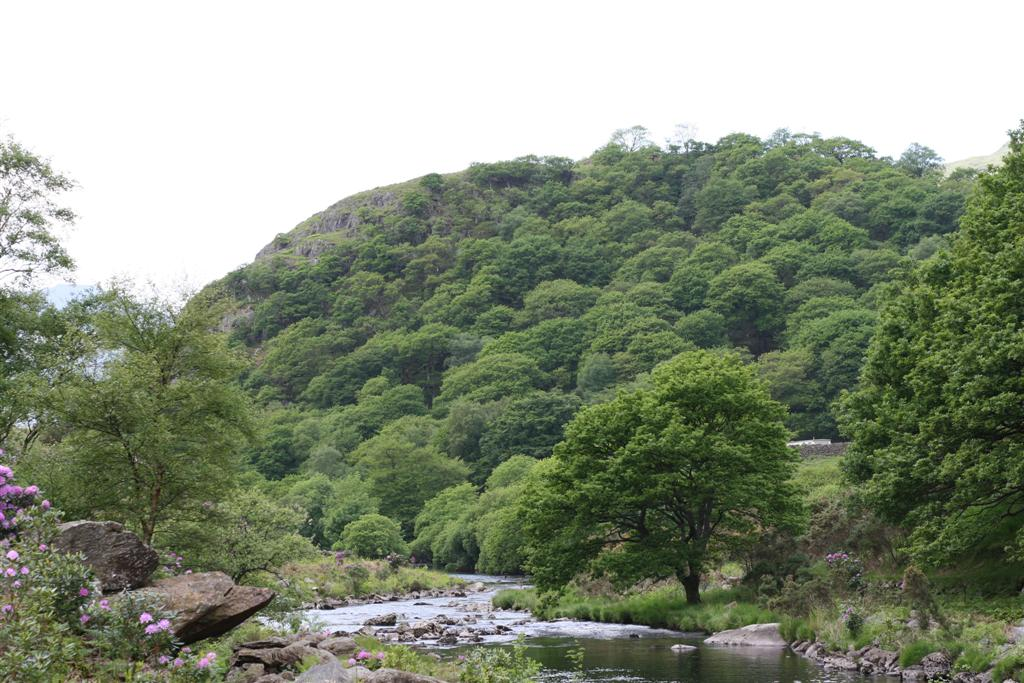
- Dinas Emrys with the River Glaslyn in the foreground

- Location within Gwynedd
- Coordinates: 53.022°N 4.079°W
- Grid position: SH 60669 49228
- Location: Gwynedd, Wales, UK

Dinas Emrys (Welsh for 'Emrys's city') is a rocky and wooded hillock near Beddgelert in Gwynedd, north-west Wales. Rising some 76 m (250 ft) above the floor of the Glaslyn river valley, it overlooks the southern end of Llyn Dinas in Snowdonia.

Little remains of the Iron Age hillfort or castle structures that once stood here, save its stone ramparts and the base of a keep [Grid reference SH 60669 49228]. Some believe the castle was erected by Llewelyn the Last to guard the road to the mountain pass of Snowdon.

== Description ==
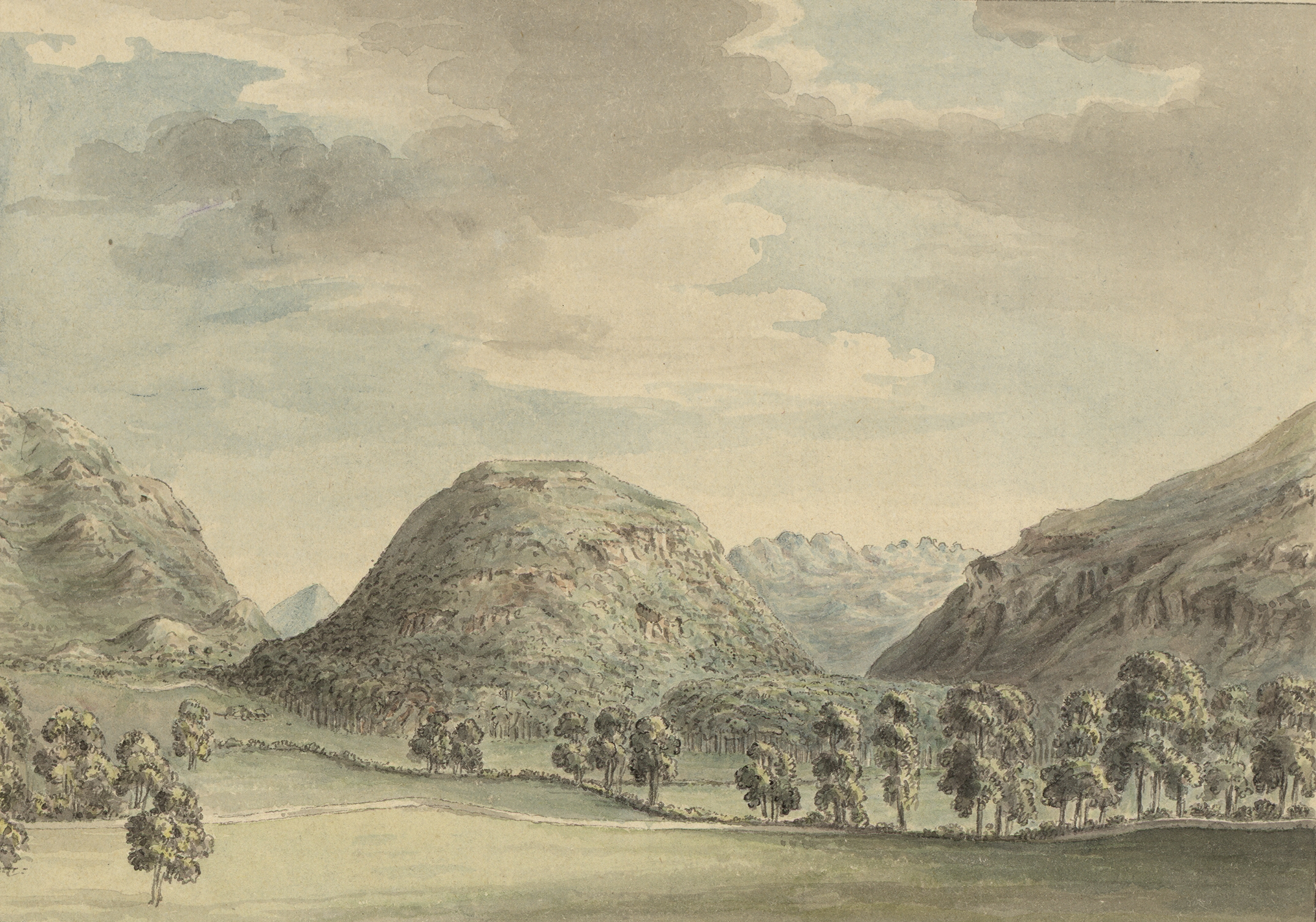
Dinas Emrys, from Pennant's A tour in Wales, 1778

Little remains of the structures that once stood on the hill. Such remains as are visible today, including three series of ramparts and other walls and some foundations, mostly date to the Middle Ages. Archaeologist H. N. Savory described the fortifications as consisting of stone walls between 2.5 and 3 metres (8 and 10 ft) thick, which exploited every irregularity in the rocky hill-top, enclosing an irregular area of about a 10,000 m^{2} (110,000 sq ft) in size. The original means of access was by a steep path on the western side of the hillfort. The present entrance from the north-east is a later addition.

Excavations in 1910 and 1954–56 revealed several periods of habitation at the site. The earliest elements date to the Iron Age, perhaps to the 1st or 2nd century. A pool within the enclosure, thought to be an artificial construction, may date to this phase. It is perhaps connected to the pool found in the popular tale of Vortigern and the dragons. Other traces suggest habitation into the 5th century, which would put it in the time frame for Vortigern and Ambrosius Aurelianus.

It has long been known that there is a pool inside the fort, but when the archaeologist Dr H. N. Savory excavated the hillfort between 1954 and 1956, he was surprised to find that not only were the fortifications of about the right time frame for either Vortigern or Ambrosius, but that there was a platform above the pool as described in the Historia Britonum. However, he found the platform to date much later than the accepted floruit of either personage.

== Literary tradition ==
While it is of interest to archaeologists because it is an example of a hillfort whose fortifications entirely postdate the Roman period, this hill is also of interest to enthusiasts about the legends of King Arthur. This is the setting of the famous exchange of the warlord Vortigern and the youthful Ambrosius as told the Historia Britonum.

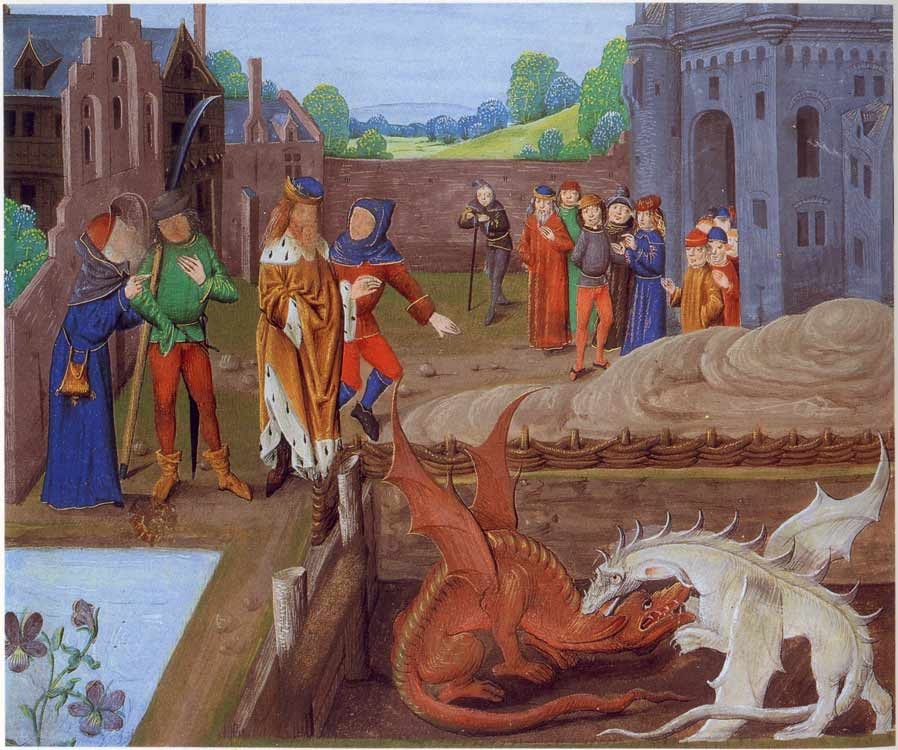
Detail from Lambeth Palace Library MS 6 folio 43v illustrating an episode in Historia Regum Britanniae (c. 1136). Pictured above Vortigern sits at the edge of a pool whence two dragons emerge, one red and one white, which do battle in his presence.

According to legend, when Vortigern fled into Wales to escape the Anglo-Saxon invaders, he chose this lofty hillfort as the site for his royal retreat. Every day his men would work hard erecting the first of several proposed towers; but the next morning they would return to find the masonry collapsed in a heap. This continued for many weeks until Vortigern was advised to seek the help of a young boy not conceived by a mortal man. The King sent his soldiers out across the land to find such a lad. The boy they found was called Myrddin Emrys (Merlin Ambrosius). Vortigern, following the advice of his councillors, was planning to kill the boy in order to appease supernatural powers that prevented him from building a fortress here. Merlin scorned this advice, and instead explained that the hillfort could not stand due to a hidden pool containing two vermes (dragons). He explained how the White Dragon of the Saxons though winning the battle at present, would soon be defeated by the Welsh Red Dragon. After Vortigern's downfall, the fort was given to High-King Ambrosius Aurelianus, known in Welsh as Emrys Wledig, hence its name.

=== Origin and confinement of the dragons ===
The Prophecy of Merlin which features the enduring legend of the Red Dragon is centred on Dinas Emrys

The earliest sources regard the two dragons as distinctly different, and in a metaphor of the Adventus Saxonum describes one as being native to the island of Britain (it had arrived first) which was then joined by another new and alien dragon that fought it for supremacy.

As to how the dragons became confined there, the story of Lludd and Llefelys in the Mabinogion gives details. According to the legend, when Lludd ruled Britain (c.100 BC), a hideous scream, whose origin could not be determined, was heard each May Eve. This scream so perplexed the Britons that it caused infertility, panic and mayhem throughout the realm. In need of help Lludd sought counsel on this and other matters from his brother Llefelys, a King of Gaul. Llefelys furnished the information that the scream was caused by battling dragons. The scream would be uttered by the dragon of the Britons when it was fighting another alien dragon and was being defeated. Lludd heeded the advice given to him by Llefelys and captured both dragons in a cauldron filled with mead when they had transformed themselves, as apparently dragons did, into pigs. The captured dragons were buried at the place later called Dinas Emrys, as it was regarded as the safest place to put them.

The main entrance to the fort is on the northern side of the hill and traces of a ruined medieval tower 36 feet by 24 feet have been found on the summit. Nearby is a circle of tumbled stones about 30 feet in diameter which is said to be where the dragons were hidden. Before Dinas Emrys was so-named the fort was known as Dinas Ffaraon Dandde.

=== Other local legends ===
According to local legend Myrddin hid treasure in a cave at Dinas Emrys. The discoverer of the treasure will be 'golden-haired and blue-eyed'. When that lucky person is near to Dinas Emrys a bell will ring to invite him or her into the cave, which will open of its own accord as soon as that person's foot touches it. A young man who lived near Beddgelert once searched for the treasure, hoping to give himself a good start in life. He took a pickaxe and climbed to the top of the hill. When he began to dig in earnest on the site of the tower, some terrible unearthly noises began to rumble under his feet. The Dinas began to rock like a cradle and the sun clouded over so it became pitch dark. Lightning flashed in the sky and thunder clapped over his head. He dropped the pickaxe and ran home. When he arrived, everything was calm again, but he never returned to collect his pickaxe. Not far from Dinas Emrys is Cell y Dewiniaid – "The Grove of the Magicians". There is a field here that once had a thick grove of oak trees at its north end. Local tradition holds that Vortigern's wise men used to meet here to discuss the great events of their times. An adjacent field is where they were buried and at one time a stone marked the site of each grave. A white thorn tree annually decorated each resting place with falling white blossoms.

== Actual archaeological findings ==
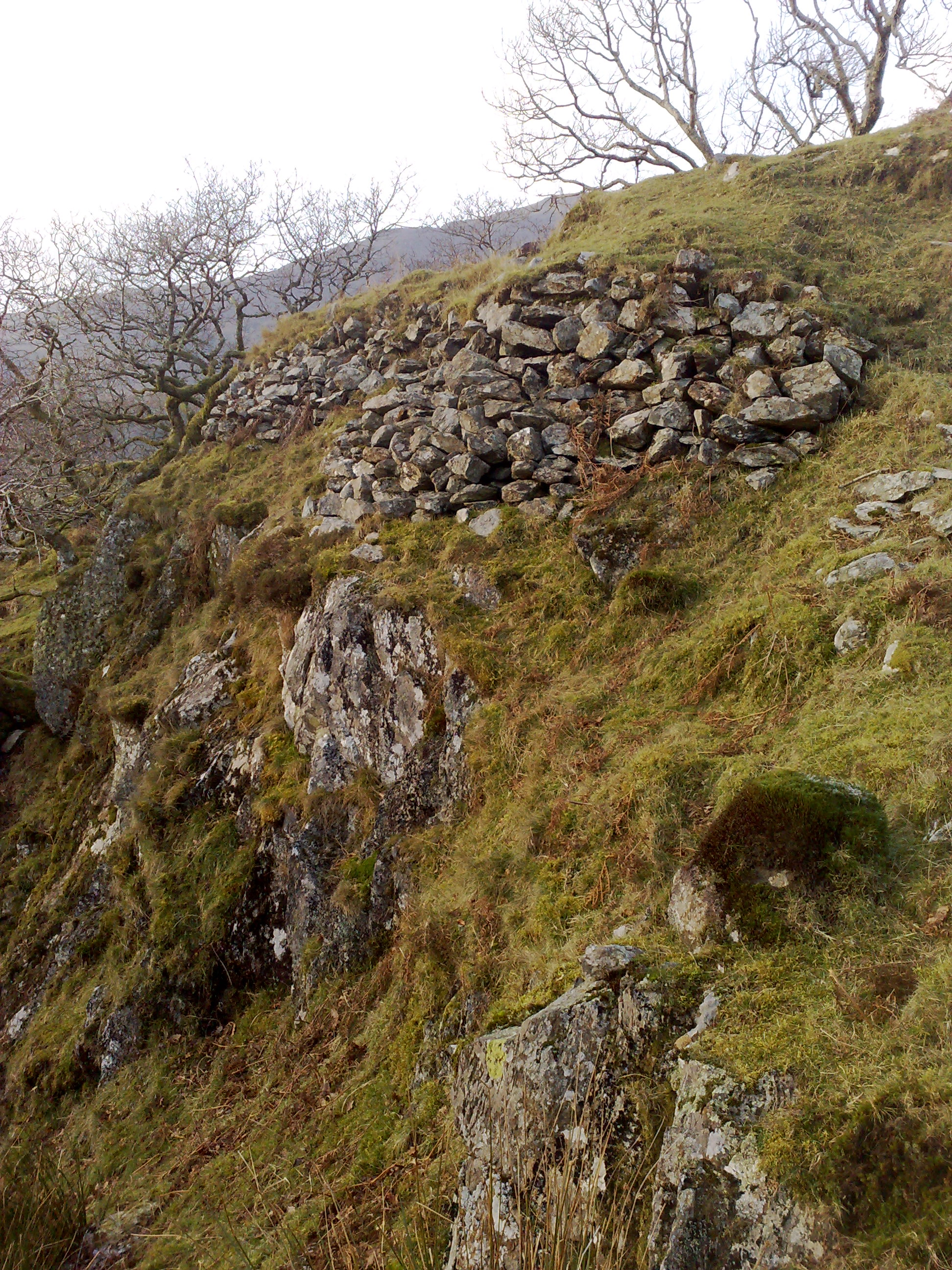
Archaeologists have speculated that this may be the platform above the pool where the prophecy was revealed

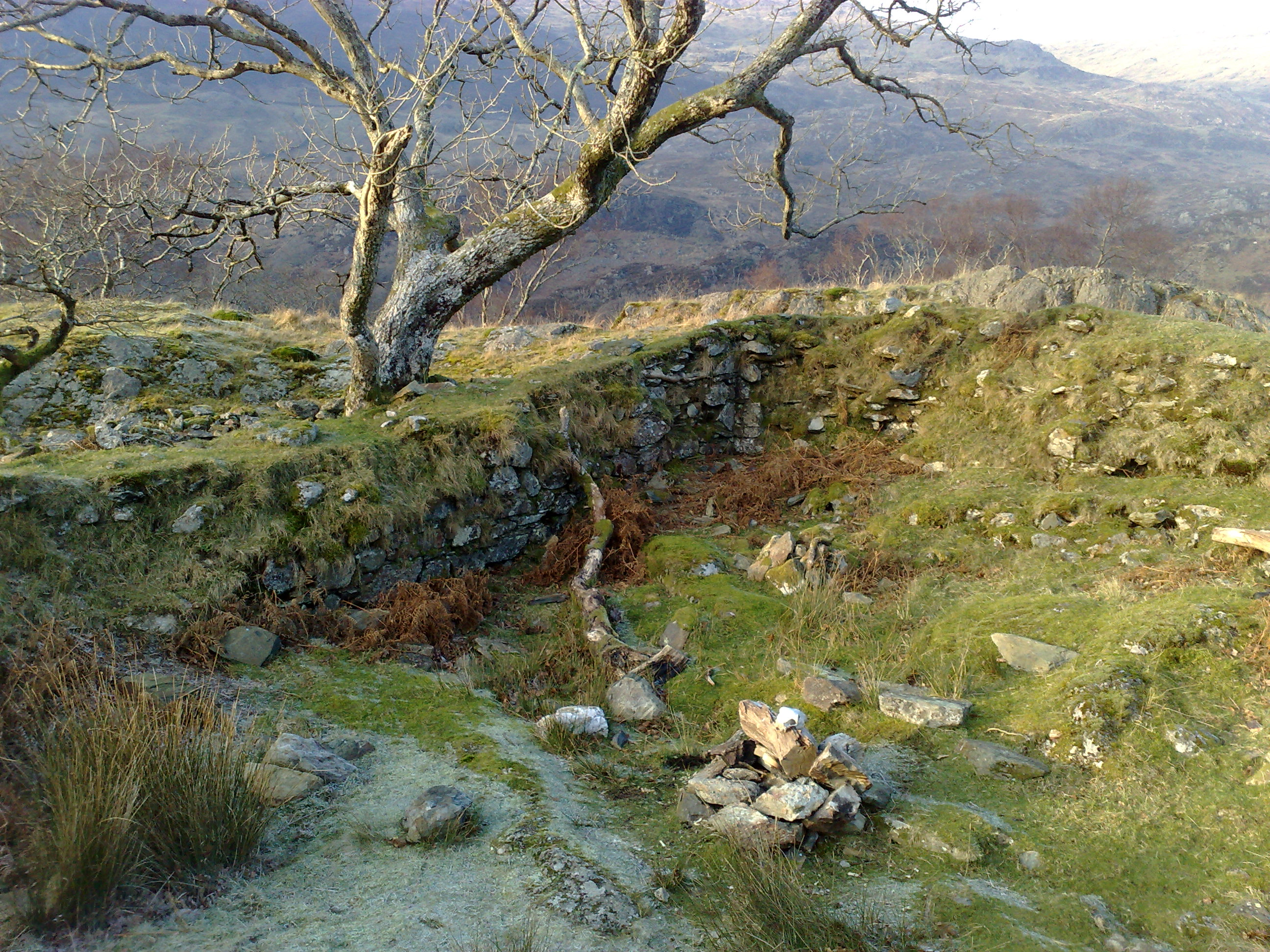
Ruins of what is considered to be an 11th Century tower

It has long been known that there is a pool inside the fort, but when the archaeologist Dr H. N. Savory excavated the hillfort between 1954 and 1956, he was surprised to find that not only were the fortifications of about the right time frame for either Vortigern or Ambrosius, but that there was a platform above the pool as described in the Historia Brittonum. However, he found the platform to date much later than the accepted floruit of either personage.

Savory described the fortifications as consisting of stone walls between 2.5 and 3 metres (8 and 10 ft) thick, which exploited every irregularity in the rocky hill-top, enclosing an irregular area of about a 10,000 m^{2} (110,000 sq ft) in size. The original means of access was by a steep path on the western side of the hillfort. The present entrance from the north-east is a later addition. The walls had been "poorly built of stone two or three times ", possibly inspiring the legend's reference to the building collapsing several times during construction.

The most conspicuous object currently on the hill is the base of a rectangular tower. It is generally accepted that this is part of an undocumented castle built by the princes of Gwynedd in the eleventh century.

== Dinas Affaraon/Ffaraon ==
Dinas Affaraon or Dinas Ffaraon is a placename mentioned in some medieval Welsh literature, where it is said to be the original name of Dinas Emrys.

Dinas Ffaraon (Fortress of Pharaoh) or Dinas Ffaraon Dandde (Fortress of Fiery Pharaoh) is mentioned in the tale "Lludd and Llefelys" as the place where King Lludd of Britain traps and buries two dragons who are ravaging the land. The text explains that the site was later named "Dinas Emreis". This tale is a prequel to the older story involving the hero Emrys (Ambrosius Aurelianus) or Myrddin Emrys (Merlin). In sources such as the Historia Brittonum and Geoffrey of Monmouth's Historia Regum Britanniae, a tower built on the spot continually collapses until Emrys reveals the buried dragons as the cause; once they are released the tower is successfully constructed and named after him. The name "Dinas Emrys" has been associated with a Roman ruin in Snowdonia, a localization that possibly dates as early as the Historia Brittonum.

== Dinas Emrys in art ==
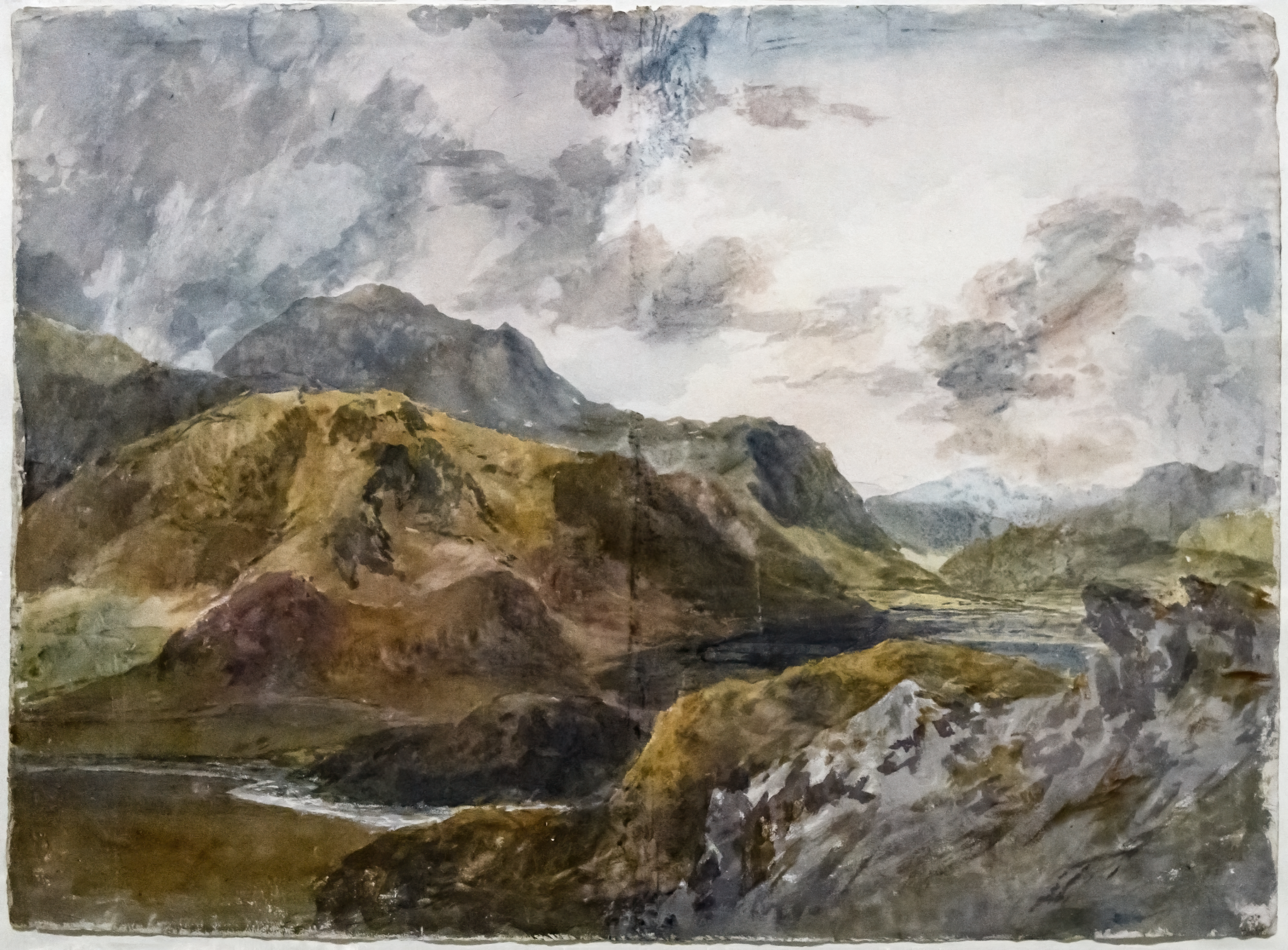
Snowdon and Dinas Emrys from above Beddgelert - William Turner - Tate Britain

== See also ==
- List of hillforts in Wales
