= Tremadog Bay =

Welsh inlet

Coordinates: 52.85295°N 4.36277°W

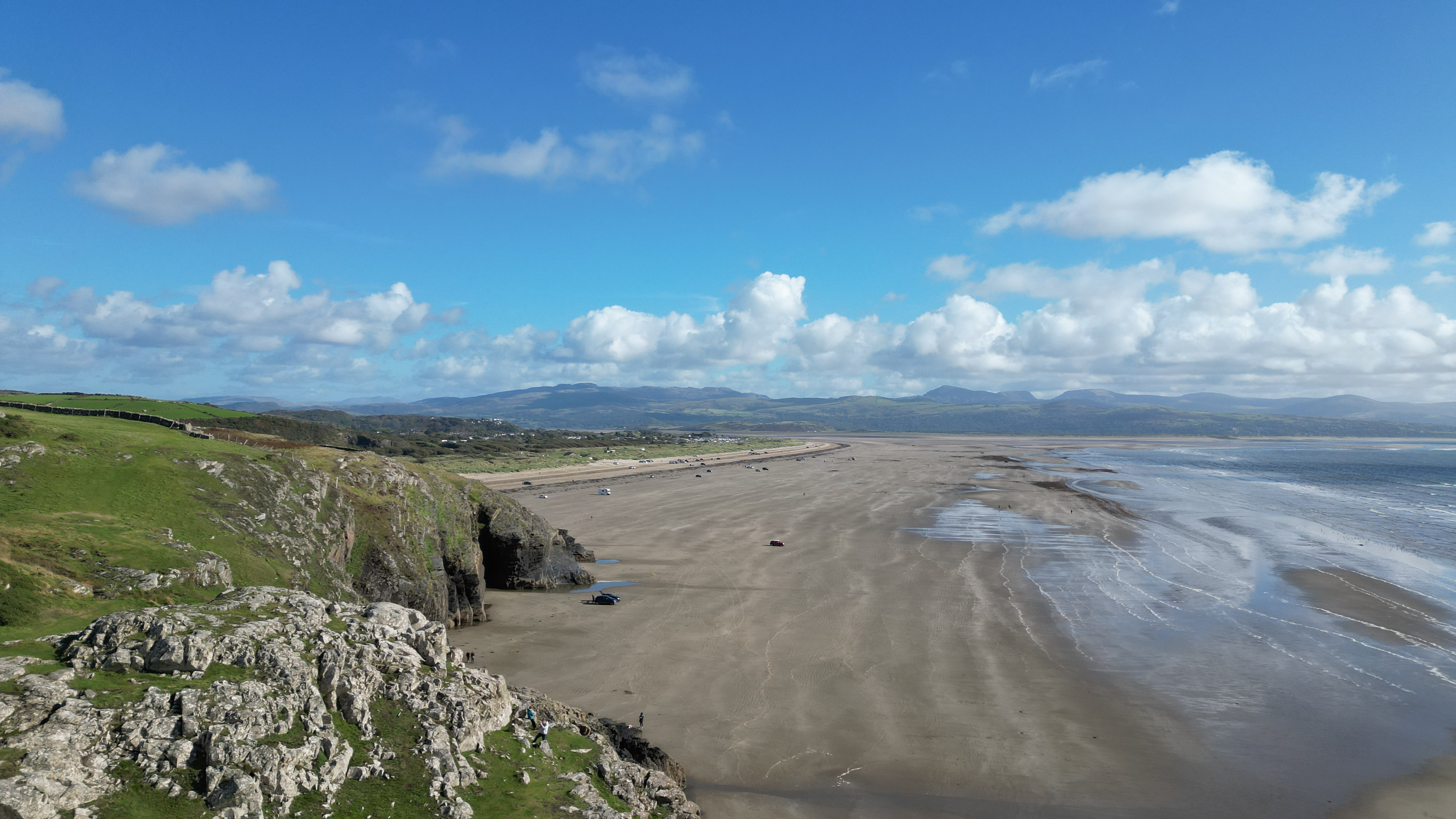
Part of the bay near Criccieth

Tremadog Bay (also spelled Tremadoc Bay; Welsh: Bae Tremadog), is a shallow inlet of Cardigan Bay in North Wales. It comprises the area between Mochras (Shell Island) in the east and the Trwyn Cilan headland of the Llŷn Peninsula in the west. The Sarn Badrig reef extends south-west from Mochras and forms a natural barrier between Tremadog Bay and Cardigan Bay proper.

The Afon Glaslyn flows into the north of the bay and Saint Tudwal's Islands lie at the western end of the bay. The towns of Pwllheli, Criccieth, Porthmadog, and Harlech lie directly on the bay.
