= Aberglaslyn Pass =

Mountain pass in Snowdonia, Wales

Coordinates: 52.9978°N 4.0944°W

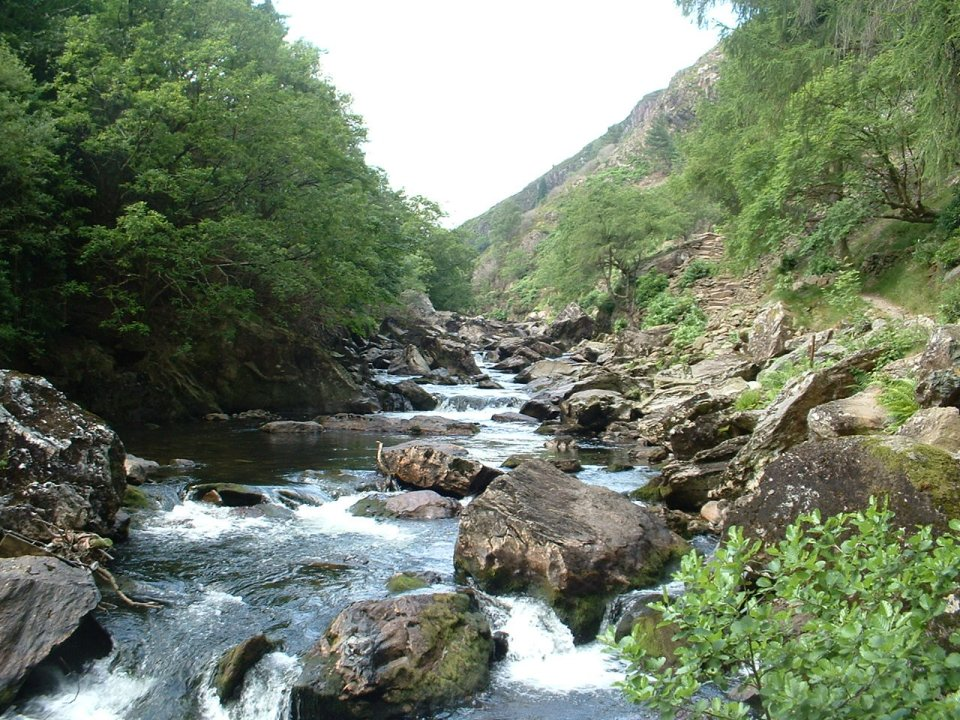
The Aberglaslyn gorge, within the pass. The Fisherman's path is the small footpath on the right.

The Aberglaslyn Pass (Welsh: Bwlch Aberglaslyn) is a narrow gorge of considerable beauty in Snowdonia, Gwynedd, north Wales. The A498 road/A4085 road follows a relatively level route along the Afon Glaslyn through the pass from Beddgelert to Prenteg and then continues at the edge of the Traeth Mawr via Tremadog to Porthmadog.

== River pass ==
As recently as the early 19th century, the river Glaslyn was navigable for small boats at high tide as far as Pont Aberglaslyn, which is just one mile (1.6 km) south of Beddgelert, where a sixth-century monastery was succeeded in the twelfth by an Augustinian priory. In the Middle Ages Beddgelert was seen as a safe resting place before travelling further. The route from the coast via Beddgelert and overland to Caernarfon or Bangor via Llyn Cwellyn was often considered preferable to the long voyage round the Llŷn Peninsula.

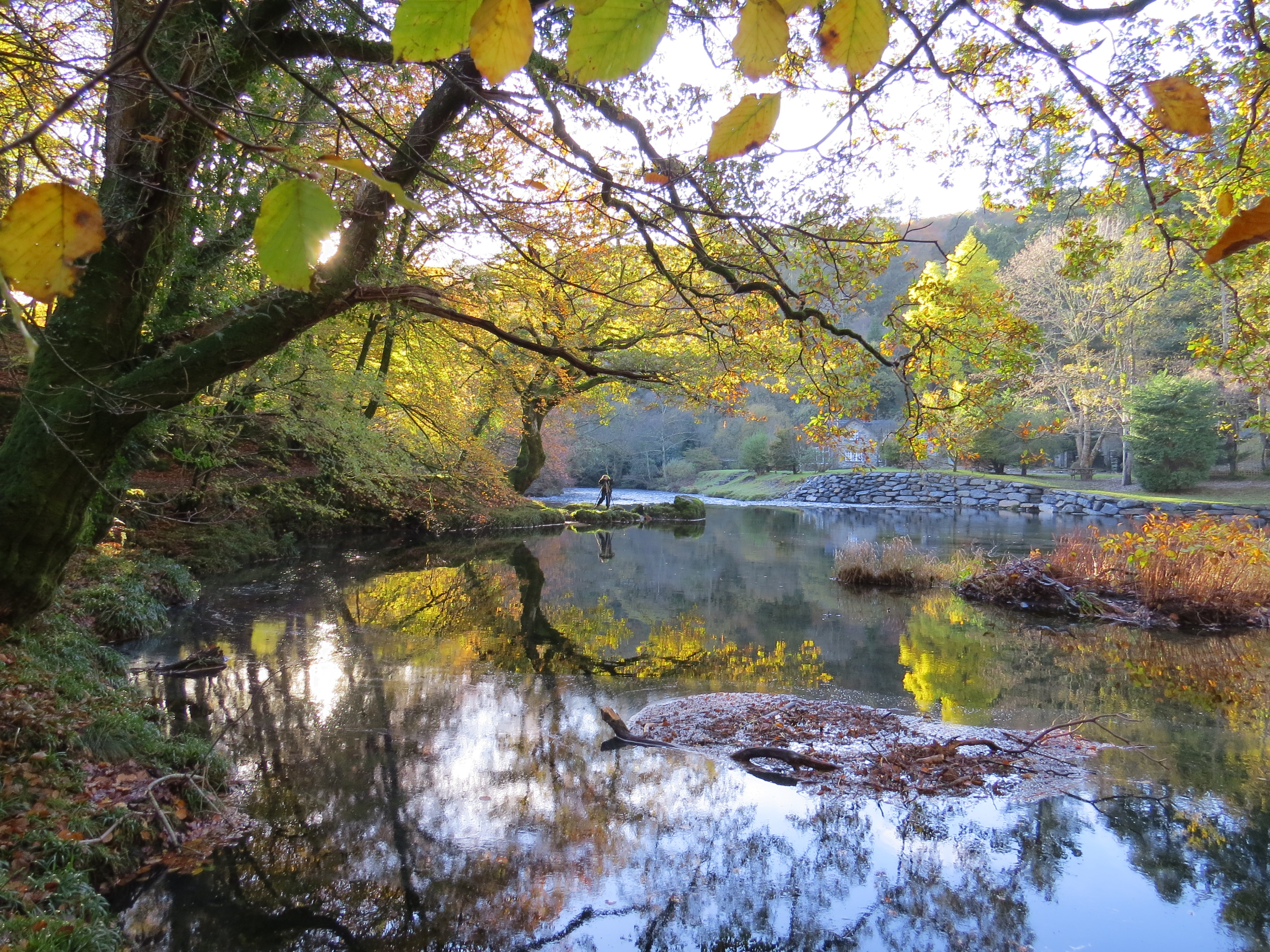
Aberglaslyn Pass near Bwthyn Aber

Pont Aberglaslyn is in the parish of Nantmor. From here to the sea, landowners have benefited significantly from the land reclamation made possible by the construction at Porthmadog in 1812 of the great embankment across the Traeth Mawr estuary, known as The Cob.

Pont Aberglaslyn has a bridge with a connection to the Devil. It is very similar to other Devil and bridge-related stories found throughout the British Isles. The Devil built the bridge on the understanding that he would receive the soul of the first living creature to cross over it. When the bridge was finished he went to the local inn (Y Delyn Aur) to inform the magician Robin Ddu that it was ready. Robin went to inspect the new bridge with a dog he lured from the pub with a fresh-baked loaf of bread. Upon seeing the bridge Robin asked the Devil whether it was sturdy and how much weight it could carry as he thought it might not even take the weight of the loaf he was carrying. The Devil was shocked and demanded that the magician throw his loaf onto the bridge to prove that it was indeed strong enough. So Robin threw the loaf onto the bridge and the dog chased it across the bridge, thus cheating the Devil of a human soul. Robin Ddu then returned to the pub to finish his drinking.

In another version of this tale, it is a local hotelier who asks Robin to aid him in constructing a bridge and as payment, Robin was to take the soul of the first living person that crossed it.

Robin Ddu or Black Robin the Magician, or more correctly Robin Ddu ap Siencyn Bledrydd of Anglesey, lived circa 1450. He was a poet and sometimes known as a prophetic poet, and about ninety of his pieces are still preserved on manuscripts. It would appear that Robin also pretended to be a sorcerer or wizard and he appears in many Welsh tales.

== Railway tunnel ==
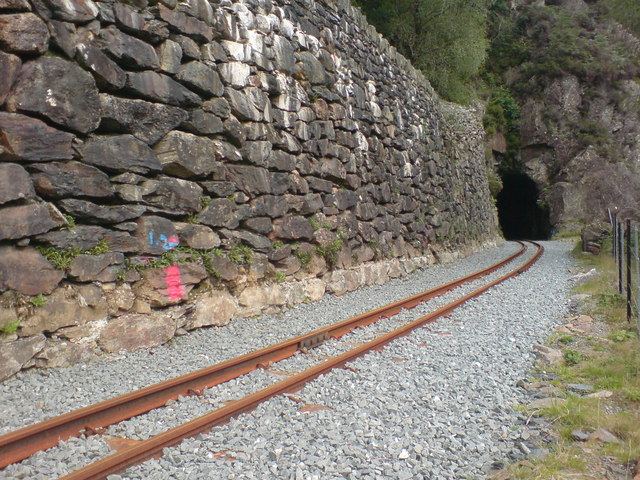
The longest of the railway tunnels on the Welsh Highland Railway

In the later 19th century, with the coming of the Cambrian Railways, numerous schemes were proposed for the construction of a railway to Beddgelert. Some were started and there are several examples of abandoned railway works in the past. One scheme eventually succeeded and the Welsh Highland Railway was opened in 1922 from Dinas near Caernarfon to Porthmadog. The railway was closed in 1937 and the rails requisitioned and removed for War Department use in 1941. The trackbed remained in the ownership of the receiver of the company, and an iron girder bridge was left.

Since then, the railway trackbed and its three tunnels had become a very popular path for walking and hiking. The longest tunnel was first built in 1906 but was not used by rail until 1922. Before the Cob was built, the Glaslyn estuary was tidal as far as Pont Aberglaslyn and the fisherman's path through the pass was used as a route to the coast. It gradually fell out of use and through erosion by the river, became impassable.

In 1995 and 1996, controversy ensued, as the Ffestiniog Railway was seeking to take ownership of the trackbed to rebuild the Welsh Highland Railway. Walkers and environmentalists claimed that an important footpath would be lost. However, having no real argument (given that the fisherman's path was still alongside the railway owned trackbed), they claimed that owing to danger from falling rocks the pass would be unsafe for trains. In order to meet these objections and fears, civil engineering consultants produced plans for remedial works to overhanging rock, retaining walls and paths and this work was done by local expert contractors.

In the Autumn of 2000, the Welsh Highland Railway closed the trackbed to walkers in order to prepare for the rebuilding of the railway. The railway company, along with the National Trust, which owns the surrounding land, worked to rebuild the fisherman's path for use again.

In 2003, after some delay, a new footbridge was built across the river at Bryn-y-felin. Prior to this, in 1999, the old railway girder bridge had been removed, although even for some years before that its use as a footbridge had been banned. In March 2006 a replacement girder bridge was installed, this largely identical to the original bridge, which had laid unmaintained since 1936, and was consequently weak through corrosion – the original bridge (of a modular design intended for use in India) had never been painted and never had holes drilled for rain-water to drain away, despite both of these measures being suggested by the railway inspector in the 1920s, hence the advanced state of decay on this and two other identical bridges on the WHR by the time of their removal.

The public continued to unofficially use the trackbed and tunnels as a footpath until construction work on the railway made such use dangerous. Until that point, however, the railway had offered better views for walkers than the Fisherman's Path, plus the thrill of walking through the tunnels which also provided a more direct route to Nantmor car-park than the narrow and slippery Fisherman's Path.

Tracklaying progress on the railway reached the pass with the relaying of track across Bryn-y-felin bridge in August 2007, and by mid-October had already passed beyond the tunnels and the stretch of dramatic rock cuttings and embankments near Nantmor.
