= Aberglaslyn Hall =

Learning centre in North Wales

Coordinates: 52.992587°N 4.097098°W

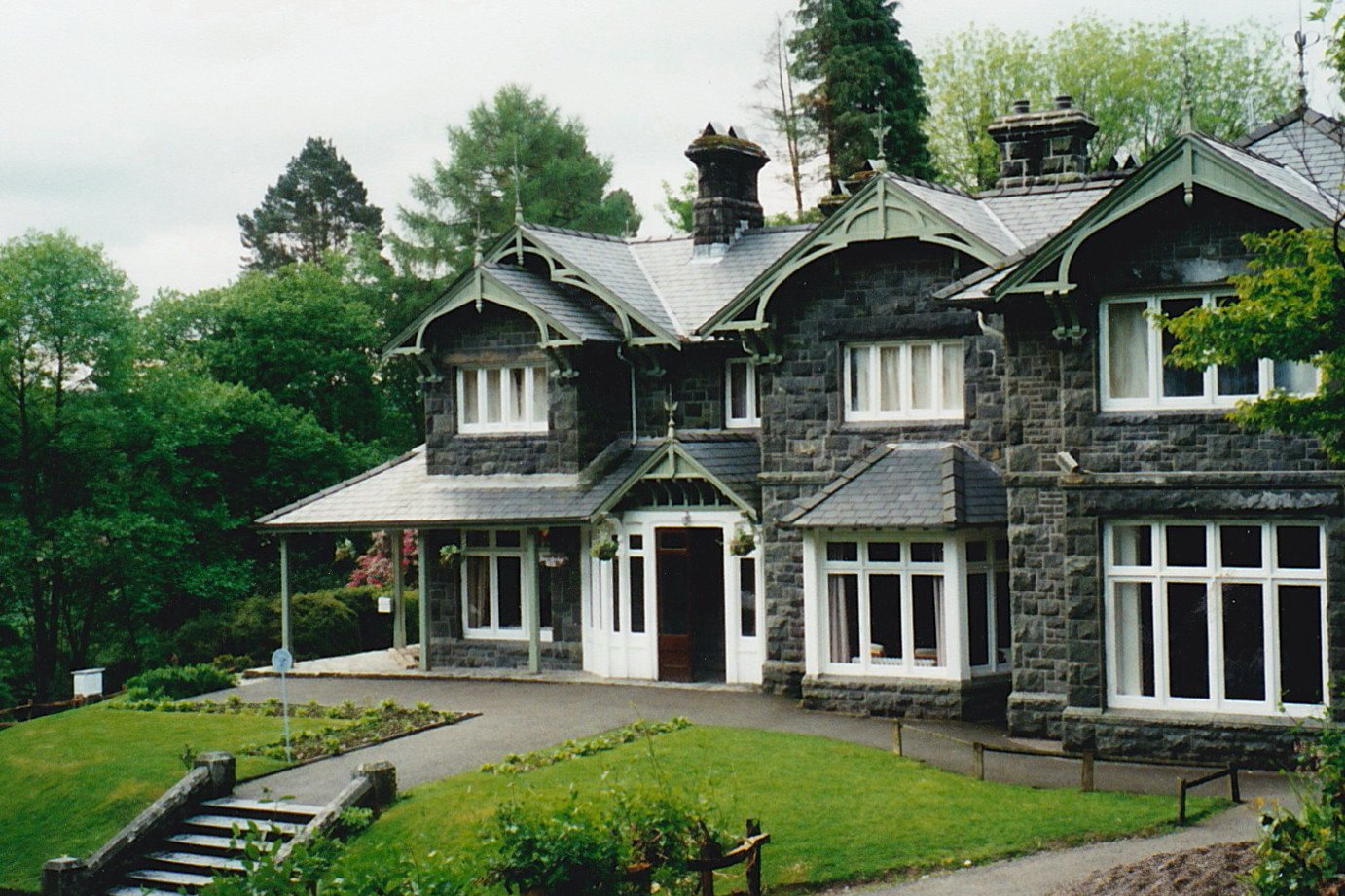
Aberglaslyn Hall

Aberglaslyn Hall is an outdoor learning centre near Beddgelert, North Wales on the edge of the Snowdonia National Park. The hall was purchased by Leicestershire County Council in 1962. It offers dormitory style accommodation for up to 48 people and serves as a residential centre for groups wishing to participate in outdoor activities and environmental education.

== Early history ==
In 1873 the land was used as a copper mine run by John Greaves. Aberglaslyn Hall was originally built in 1880 as a private dwelling by John Ernest Greaves. In 1891 Aberglaslyn was sold to John Albert Alexander Williams (born 1863) of Glangwna; he enlarged and improved the property, including installing an organ in the current dining room which was powered by a generator from the stream. Williams resided at Aberglaslyn Hall and was Sheriff of Carnarvonshire in 1895. His musical compositions included the march "Cambria" which was played at the investiture of the Prince of Wales at Carnarvon in 1911.

In 1914 Aberglaslyn was sold to Horace Raven from Leicestershire; he supplied London Zoo with bamboo during World War I.

During the 1920s Aberglaslyn was sold to Gordon Hayward from Derby. He was a timber merchant and intended to use the woodland for his business, however within two years a preservation order was placed on the woods preventing him from using the timber.

The house has a lodge, Bridge House or Ty Bont, at Pont Aberglaslyn. It is listed at Grade II.

== Purchase by Leicestershire County Council ==
In 1962, Ron Swann, deputy Director of Education under Stewart Mason, was asked by Mason to go to Wales and find a suitable building for an outdoor education centre.

In Donald K. Jones's biography of Mason the author writes: "The acquisition of the Aberglaslyn Centre is one of the 'epics' of the Mason era. One day in 1962 he sent Ron Swann off 'with orders not to come back from Wales until he had found something'. Never one to fail on a mission like this, Swann found three possible houses, one of which was in an extremely dilapidated condition, nearly a 'romantic ruin', in fact, and this was the one Mason chose."

When the former country house was bought by the council in 1962, it cost just £7,000. It was converted by the council to a residential outdoor education centre opening in 1965. The Hall provided a high-quality outdoor education experience for thousands of Leicestershire students, youth groups and adults.

== Current use ==
Since 1962 the hall has continued to be an outdoor education centre, visited by schools in Leicestershire and from further afield. Aberglaslyn Hall offers canoeing, coastal activities, coastal studies, gorge walking, mountain activities, mountain biking, outdoor and adventurous activities and rock climbing and abseiling. Team building courses are also offered by the staff at Aberglaslyn Hall for both student and adult groups.

== Current situation ==
In 2011 Leicestershire County Council signalled its intention to close Aberglaslyn as it was making a loss of around £56,000 per year. A community group is currently working with the council to form a trust or charitable organisation which will continue to run the hall as a not-for-profit enterprise.

=== Friends of Aberglaslyn ===
The Friends of Aberglaslyn formed in 2004 to work for the future of Aberglaslyn Hall. In 2012, with Leicestershire County Council planning to close and sell the Hall, the group are looking to work to ensure that this facility remains available for the people of Leicestershire. To this end the group has proposed setting up the 'Aberglaslyn Hall Trust', a Charity dedicated to managing the Hall on a commercial basis but for an educational and social purpose. The group has assembled a strong professional shadow board of Trustees ready to take over management of the Hall in 2013.

The Friends group developed a business plan to lease the Hall from the County Council. This bid was rejected and the Friends group are now taking advice on the possibility of raising funds to purchase the Hall. If successful, the work of the Hall would continue much as present but it would be run through a Charitable Trust on a not-for-profit basis.
