= Llyn Dinas =

Lake in Gwynedd, Wales

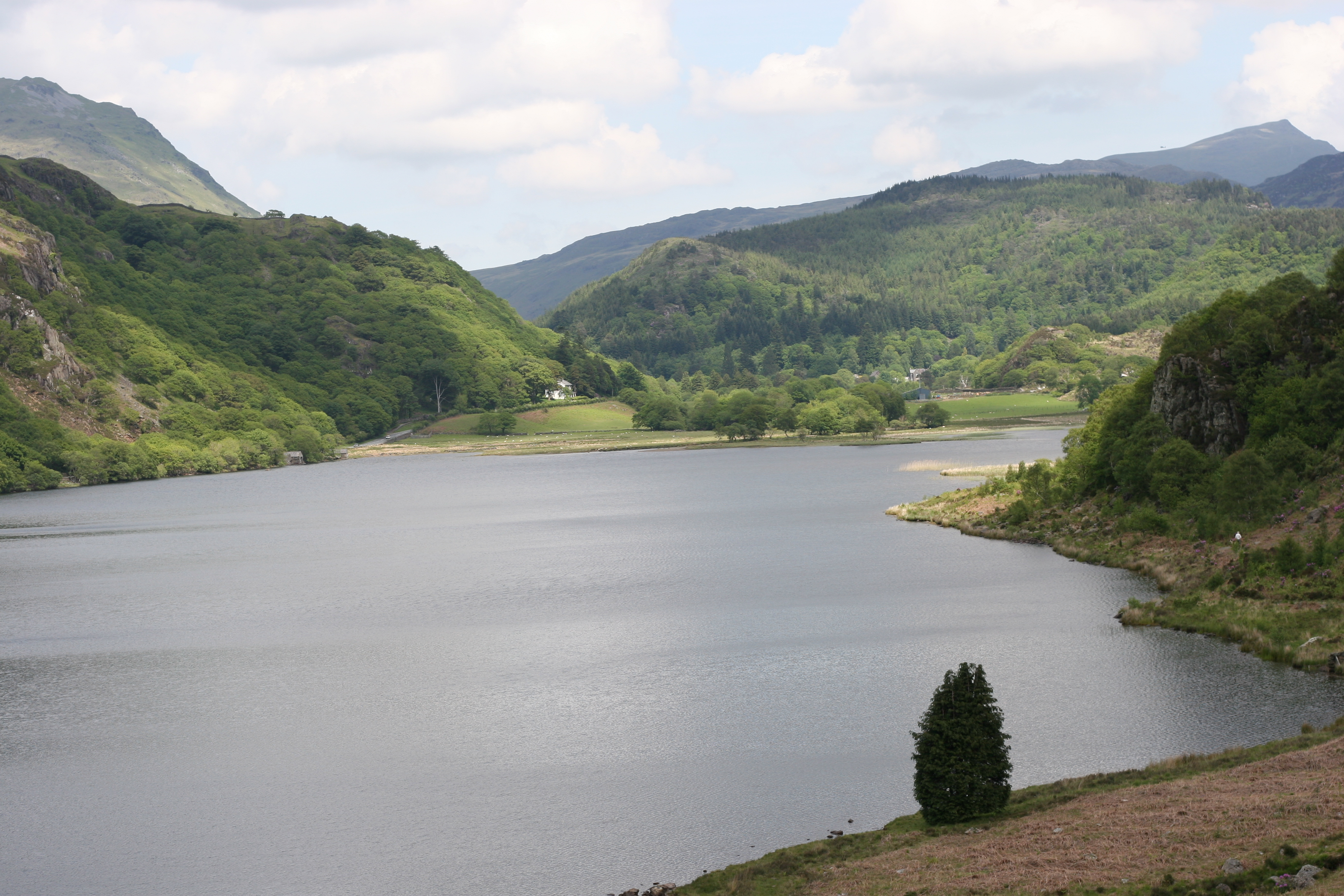
- looking north

- Location within Gwynedd
- Location: North Wales
- Coordinates: 53°01′N 4°04′W
- Type: natural
- Primary inflows: River Glaslyn
- Primary outflows: River Glaslyn
- Basin countries: United Kingdom
- Surface area: 66 acres (27 ha)
- Max. depth: 10 m (33 ft)
- Surface elevation: 55 m (180 ft)

Llyn Dinas is a lake near Beddgelert, Gwynedd in north Wales. It is formed by the River Glaslyn.

Llyn Dinas lies on the valley floor a few miles north of Beddgelert at an altitude of about 55 metres above sea level. It has an area of 60 acres (240,000 m^{2}) and is fairly shallow, with the maximum depth only 10 metres. The lake offers good fishing for salmon and trout.

It takes its name from the nearby Dinas Emrys, a rocky and wooded hill just downstream of the lake where the remains of both medieval and older fortifications have been found. A rock near the lake named Carreg yr Eryr (The stone of the eagle) was said in a charter of 1198 to mark the spot where the boundaries of the three cantrefs of Aberconwy, Ardudwy and Arfon met. According to Giraldus Cambrensis an eagle used to perch on it once a week, anticipating battle between the men of the three cantrefs.

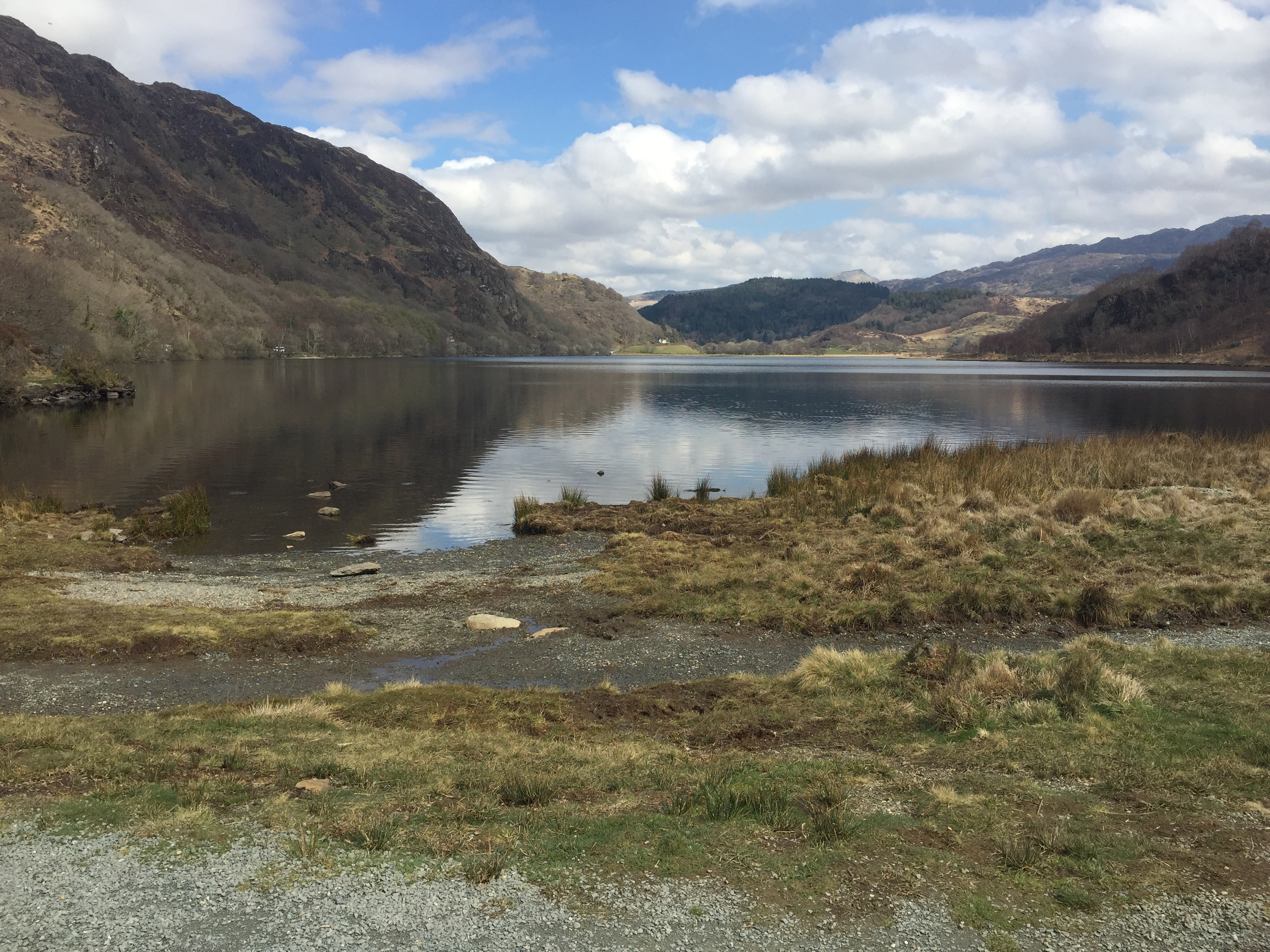
Llyn Dinas taking from the south western end of the lake.
