= Afon Glaslyn =

River in Gwynedd, Wales

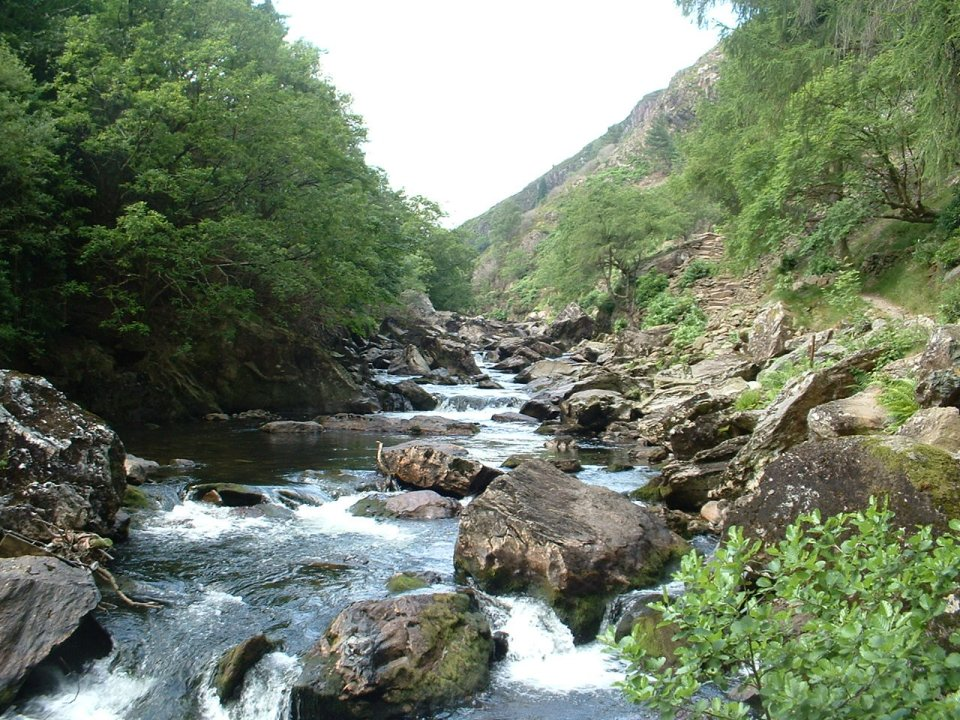
- Glaslyn Gorge

Location
- Country: Wales
- Counties: Gwynedd
- Towns: Porthmadog
- Villages: Beddgelert

Physical characteristics
- Source: Glaslyn
  - coordinates: 53°4′14″N 4°3′58″W
- Mouth: Tremadog Bay
- Length: 16 m (52 ft)

Basin features
- Tributaries
  - right: Afon Colwyn
- Waterbodies: Llyn Llydaw; Llyn Gwynant; Llyn Dinas; Llyn Bach
- Bridges: Pont Aberglaslyn; Pont Croesor; Pont Britannia

Afon Glaslyn (Welsh for 'River Glaslyn') is a river in Gwynedd, north-west Wales. While not of great significance in terms of its length (about 16 miles or 26 kilometres), it is one of Gwynedd's primary rivers, and has greatly influenced the landscape in which it flows.

It has its source in Glaslyn, a cirque lake on the flanks of Snowdon. It is joined by Nant Traswnant which drains Pen-y-Pass and by Nant Cynnyd before entering a lake, Llyn Gwynant. The river then flows through Llyn Dinas before entering the village of Beddgelert. In the middle of the village it is joined by the substantial tributary, the River Colwyn which drains the south-western flank of Snowdon. The much enlarged river flows down past Gelert's grave before tumbling down into the Aberglaslyn Pass. This is a small rocky gorge close to the main road which provides easy public access to a most picturesque piece of Snowdonian scenery.

Passing through Pont Aberglaslyn, the river emerges from the gorge into the relatively flat agricultural land of Tremadog and Porthmadog. This wide flat valley – now called Traeth Mawr – was once the estuary of the Glaslyn before the Porthmadog Cob was created. This sealed off the mouth of the estuary, enabling the land to be reclaimed. Once the river has crossed under the railway line, it meanders in large pools and marshes before eventually passing through the tidal sluices on the Cob at the south-eastern end of the town of Porthmadog, and from there into Tremadog Bay. Further south, the River Dwyryd also drains into Tremadog Bay.

The first pair of breeding ospreys in Wales nest at Pont Croesor about 4 miles (6.4 km) upstream from Porthmadog where the RSPB have set up observation facilities. They first bred in 2005 and have returned every year since.

Fishing on the Glaslyn up to Beddgelert is controlled by the Glaslyn Angling Association.

== See also ==
- Aberglaslyn Hall
