= Carnedd Arthur =

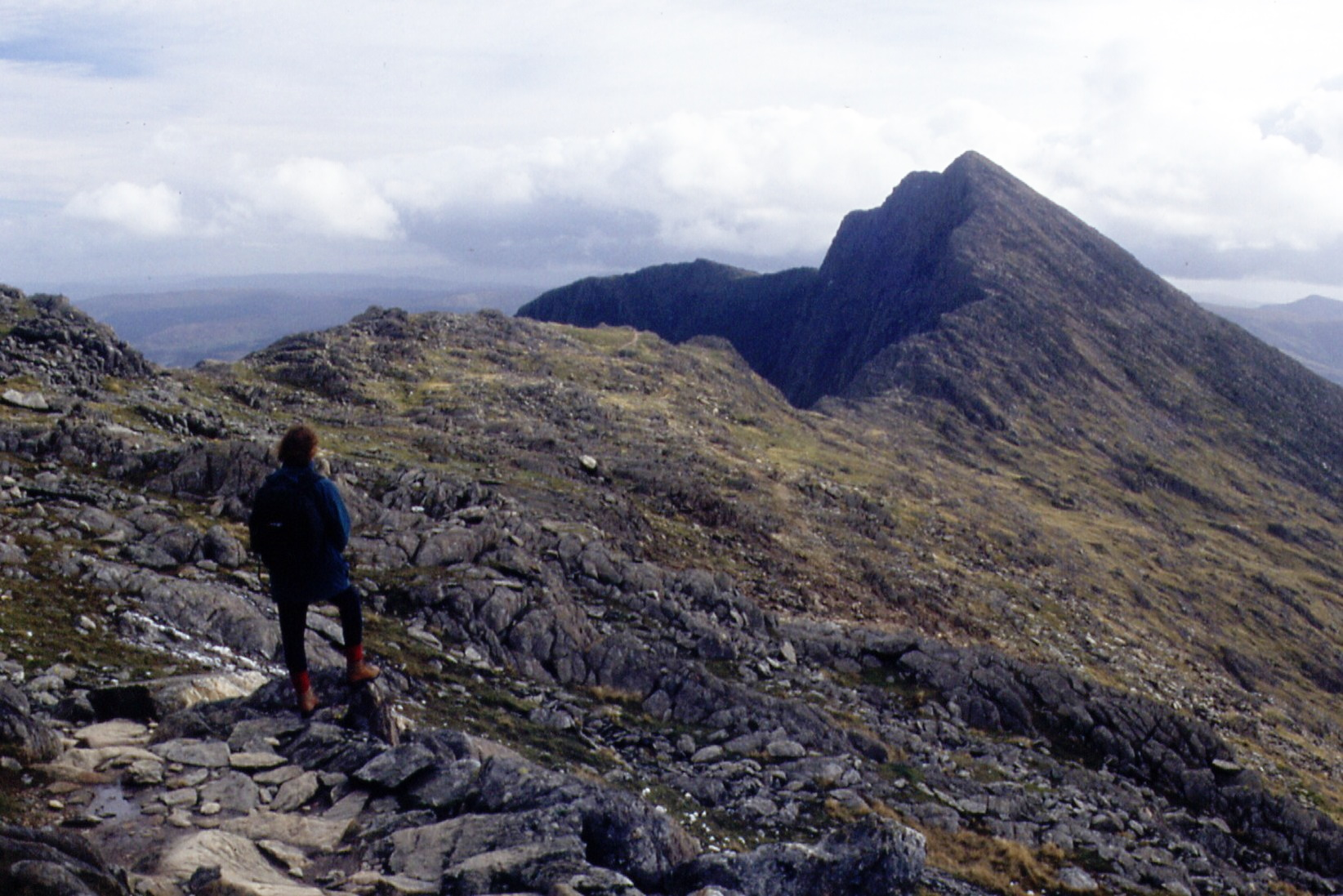
Bwlch y Saethau

Carnedd Arthur (English: Arthur's Cairn) is by folk tradition the name of a cairn on Bwlch y Saethau, the pass between Snowdon and Y Lliwedd in Snowdonia, which marks the site of King Arthur's burial. He is said to have been killed in battle against his enemies there, and his men are by the same tradition said to lie sleeping in a nearby cave called Ogof Llanciau Eryri (English: Cave of the Youth of Eryri) above the lake of Llyn Llydaw. Since Arthur is elsewhere widely represented as having died at the Battle of Camlann it is conjectured that this folktale stems from a misidentification of the names of Camlann and Cwm Llan, a valley on the southern slopes of Snowdon. It is now impossible to precisely locate Carnedd Arthur, there being several cairns on Bwlch y Saethau.

== Early associations of Arthur with Snowdon ==
Snowdon appears in many works of medieval Arthurian literature. In Geoffrey of Monmouth's 12th-century Historia Regum Britanniae Arthur is said to have fought a giant called Ritho on "mons Aravius", a mountain subsequently identified by Welsh chroniclers and continental Arthurian romance-writers as Snowdon. In later folk tradition a cairn at the summit of Snowdon, since demolished, was believed to mark Ritho's grave.

The Historia Meriadoci, a Latin romance variously dated to the 12th, 13th, or 14th century, depicts its hero, Meriadoc, along with Arthur, killing the usurper Griffin in his mountain fortress on Snowdon.

The name Snowdon was, in the form Snauedun or Sinadon, transferred by Anglo-Norman writers to the ruins of a Roman fort at the foot of the Snowdon Massif's north-western slopes, Segontium, near Caernarfon. This Sinadon makes an appearance in various French Arthurian romances.

== Arthur's death on Snowdon ==
The name of the lake Llyn Dinas, lying at the foot of the southern slopes of Snowdon, is first recorded in 1693 in a Welsh-language letter by the antiquary Edward Lhuyd. In translation, he says that "On the banks of Llyn Dinas there are three graves, called the graves of the three youths, three men, or three soldiers (that is, the soldiers of Arthur [Milwyr Arthur]), or the graves of the tall men". In 1801, when Iolo Morganwg published Welsh triads of his own composition, he included one in which Iddog Cordd Prydein ("the Embroiler of Britain") is said to have met Medrod (better known as Mordred) in Nanhwynain (Nant Gwynant, the valley in which Llyn Dinas lies). Since Iddog was the man who provoked the battle of Camlann, the final battle between Arthur and Medrod, it might be inferred from Morganwg's triad that he knew of some tradition locating Camlann in that part of Snowdonia.

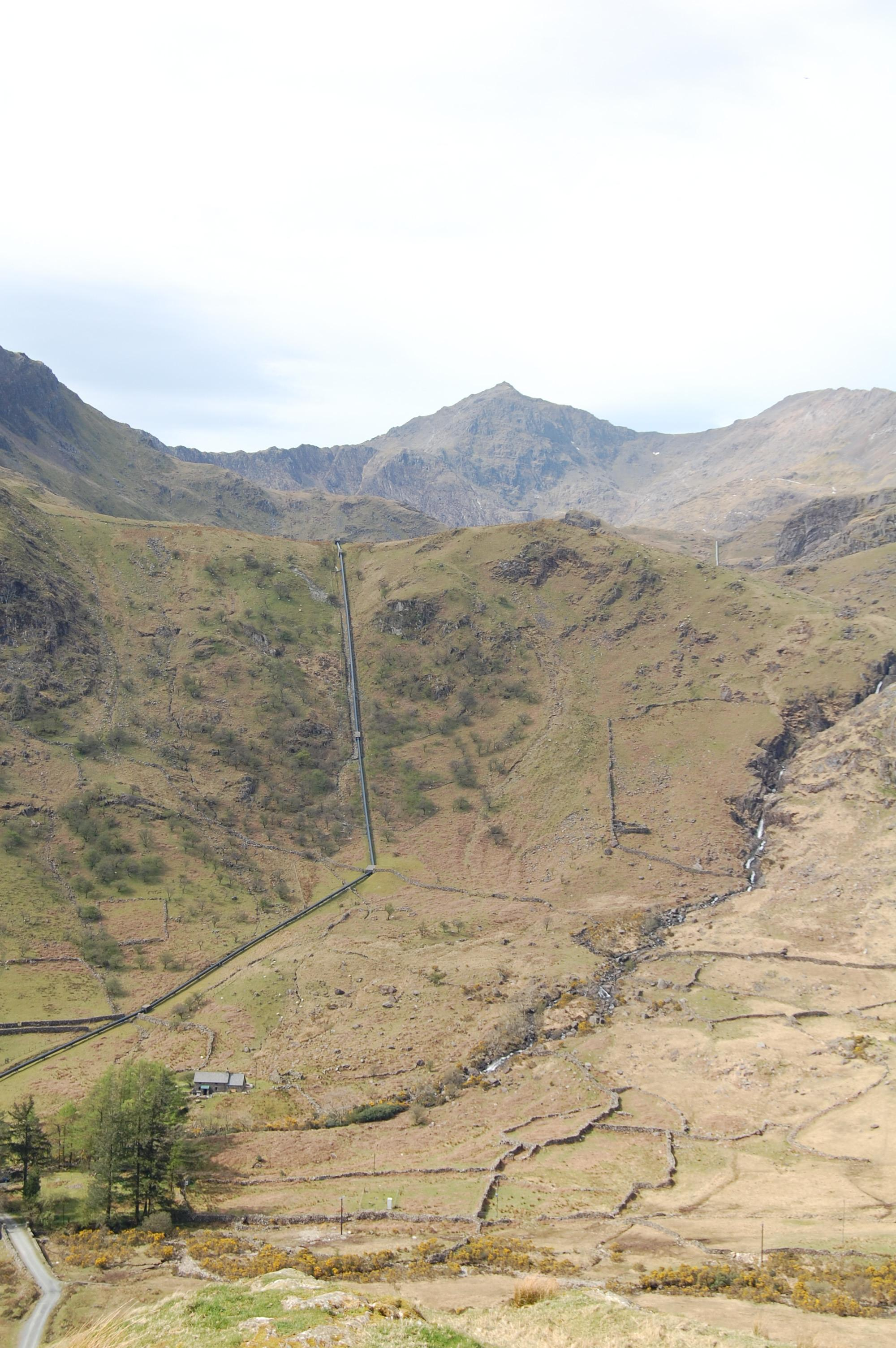
The slopes above Cwm Dyli

Such a tradition was reported at length in a Welsh-language essay by Bleddyn (bardic name of William Jones), written in 1860 and published the following year. It relates that Arthur and his men marched from Dinas Emrys, near Llyn Dinas, across the mountain of Hafod y Borth to Tregalan, an upland district of Snowdon above the valley of Cwm Llan. Here they encountered their enemy and pursued them to the pass between the summit of Snowdon and Y Lliwedd, where the vanguard of Arthur's army, himself in the lead, were subjected to a volley of arrows. Arthur was killed, and his body was buried at this same pass, since no enemy might cross that spot while Arthur's remains were there. A cairn erected on the pass was called Carnedd Arthur, and the pass itself was called Bwlch y Saethau (Pass of the Arrows). Having buried their leader, Arthur's men climbed Y Lliwedd and descended the other side to conceal themselves in a huge cave on the slopes of Cwm Dyli. They closed up the entrance from the inside with stones and turf, leaving only one small hole, then, still leaning on their shields, sank into a deep sleep. When Arthur comes again they will be ready to help him restore the kingdom of Britain for the original Britons. Hence the verse:

The Youth of Eryri, stout of Heart
Shall win their crown again.

An alternative form of this is "The lads of Snowdon [Llanciau Eryri], with their white hazels, will win it!", which became a well-known Welsh rallying cry. Jones's account of the Carnedd Arthur folktale goes on to state that many years ago a local shepherd, retrieving a lost sheep, discovered the entrance to the cave and passed through it to discover Arthur's men, but accidentally knocked his head against a bell, the ringing of which woke the warriors. The resounding shout they all gave so terrified the shepherd that he fled, and was never the same man again. Since then no-one has dared approach the cave. Its name is Ogof Llanciau Eryri (Cave of the Youth of Eryri).

In 1899 it was reported that the cairn could still be seen, that it had been the custom in recent years to repeat the Lord's Prayer nine times before passing it, and that it was located not on Bwlch y Saethau but on "an old path that goes up above Hafod y Porth" – this last on the evidence of an "old manuscript". In 1910 the rock-climber George Abraham offered the guess that the great cave below Lliwedd was "that in the Slanting Gully".

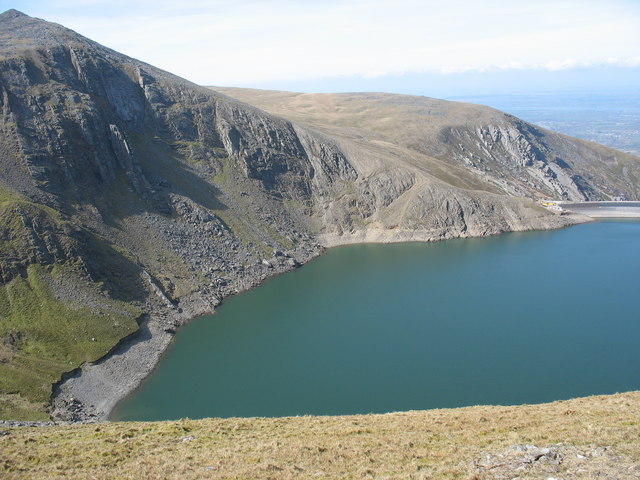
Marchlyn Mawr

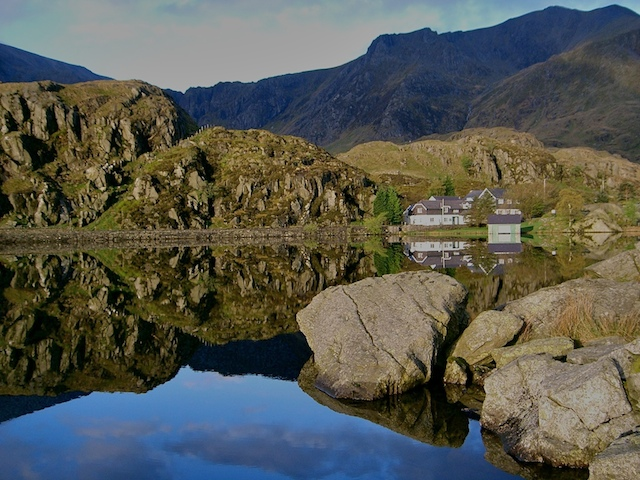
Llyn Ogwen

Sir John Rhŷs's book Celtic Folklore (1901) brought the Carnedd Arthur legend to a wider audience, an English-speaking one. Having discussed the folktale he went on to write that "the scene suggests a far more romantic picture; for down below was Llyn Llydaw with its sequestered isle...Nay with the eyes of Malory we seem to watch Bedivere making, with Excalibur in his hands, his three reluctant journeys to the lake ere he yielded it to the arm emerging from the deep." By 1980 this flight of Rhŷs's fancy was being reported as Welsh legend by Geoffrey Ashe, and by 2011 Excalibur's destination had changed, since "legend has it that Sir Bedivere carried his dying King to Llyn Llydaw, casting the sword Excalibur into Glaslyn on the way."

== Similar legends around Snowdon ==
Similar legends claim that Arthur himself can be found lying sleeping in caves all over England, Wales and beyond, sometimes with his men and sometimes without, waiting to save his country, but sometimes the hidden relics of the past are not human. Sir John Rhŷs, writing in 1883, gave on the authority of a local informant a folktale having some features in common with the Carnedd Arthur one, but set in the crags above Marchlyn Mawr, an upland lake about 5 miles (8.0 km) north of Snowdon. This tale relates that a shepherd looking for a lost sheep found instead a cave filled with treasures including King Arthur's golden crown. When he reached out to grasp it he was startled by a tremendously loud noise and the sudden falling of darkness. On escaping from the cave he saw on the lake, which was stirred up into a fury of white waves, three beautiful women in a coracle rowed by a horrific figure. The shepherd was ever afterward an ill man, given to fits of madness. Rhŷs's informant added that in the Bryn Cwrwgl (Hill of the Coracle), on the shores of Marchlyn Mawr, there was a cave called Ogof y Marchlyn which was believed to contain treasure, but that several adventurous climbers had failed to find any there. In the mid-20th century, in the same locality, the same story was told about the medieval Welsh soldier Owain Lawgoch.

Alun Llewellyn's Shell Guide to Wales and Geoffrey Ashe's Arthurian Britain agree that another of the lakes Bedivere cast the sword Excalibur into was Llyn Ogwen, about 8 miles (13 km) north east of Snowdon.

In later life the poet Robert Graves (1895–1985) remembered that

as a child I was taken to the top of a hill near Snowdon and told that this was where the usurping Modred dealt King Arthur his mortal wound, and that when seven church steeples could be seen from there, and when a pair of twins, a boy and a girl, went looking for lost lambs on a Sunday afternoon, they would find King Arthur's dinted crown rolled away under a bush of bracken.
