= Crib Goch =

Mountain in Wales

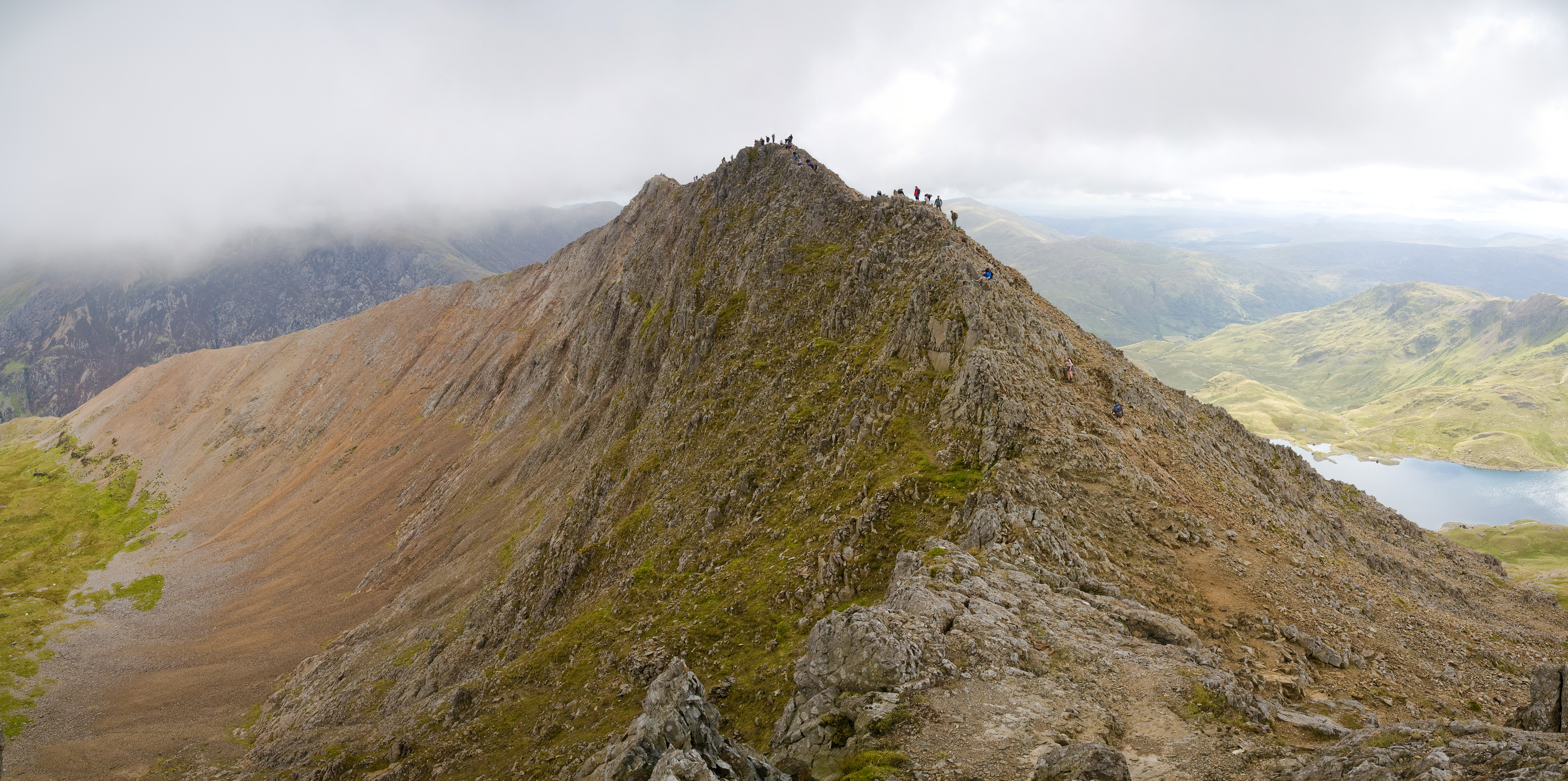
- Crib Goch from the west

Highest point
- Elevation: 923 m (3,028 ft)
- Prominence: 65 m (213 ft)
- Parent peak: Garnedd Ugain
- Listing: Hewitt, Welsh 3000s, Nuttall, Furth
- Coordinates: 53.075542°N 4.053513°W

Naming
- English translation: red ridge
- Language of name: Welsh
- Pronunciation: Welsh: [kriːb goːχ]

Geography
- Location: Gwynedd, Wales
- Parent range: Snowdonia
- OS grid: SH624551
- Topo map: OS Landranger 115

Climbing
- Easiest route: Grade 1 scramble

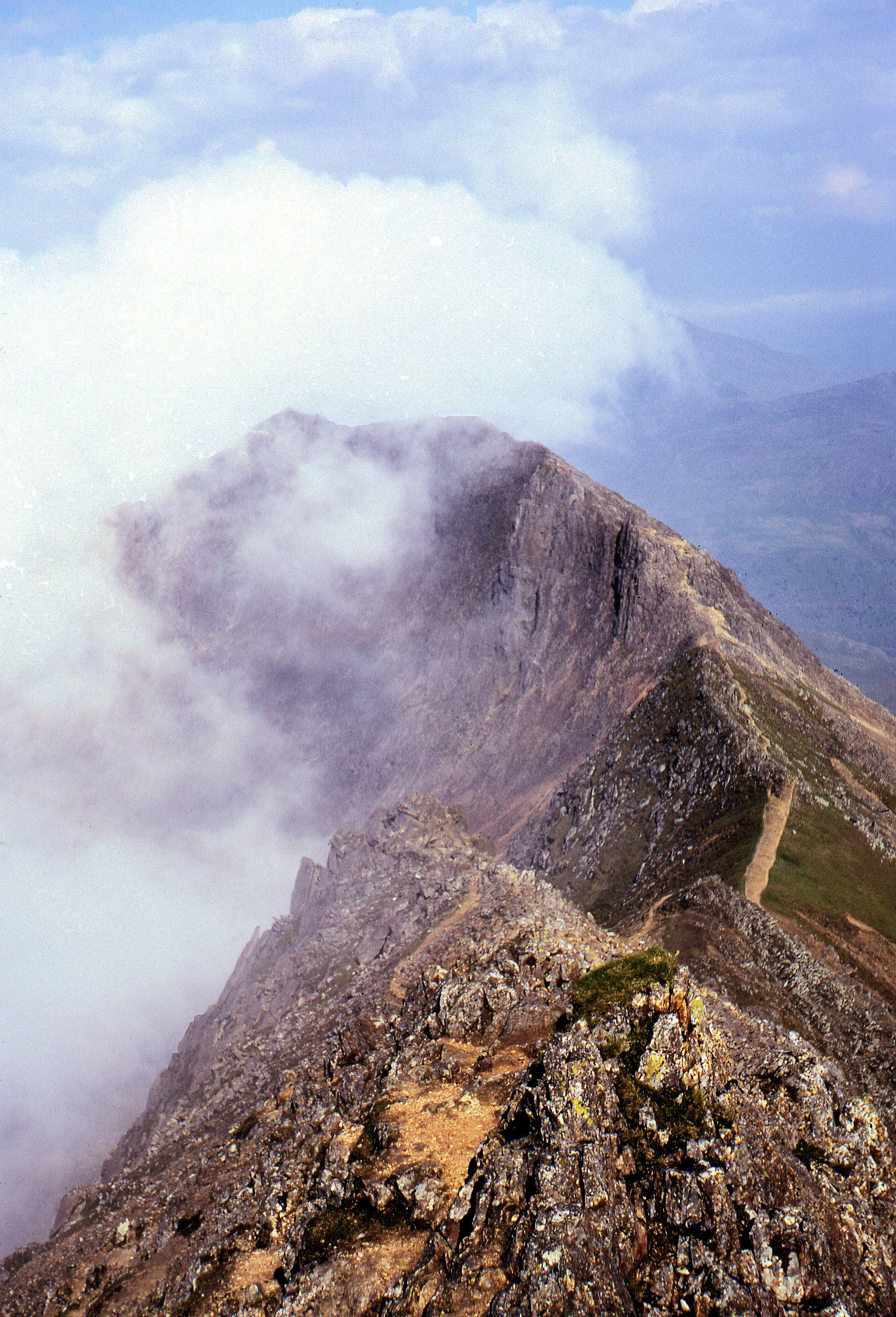
Part of the Crib Goch ridge. An easy section of the path runs over the grassy saddle

Crib Goch is a knife-edged arête in the Snowdonia National Park in Gwynedd, Wales. The name means "red ridge" in Welsh.

The highest point on the arête is 923 metres (3,028 ft) above sea level. All routes which tackle Crib Goch are considered mountaineering routes in winter or scrambles in summer—meaning that they must cross "graded territory" as defined in Steve Ashton's Scrambles in Snowdonia. The easiest of these lines (the ‘bad step’ part of the route) is given a scrambling grade of Grade 1 (the most difficult being Grade 3—routes more difficult than Grade 3 are considered rock climbs).

== Route ==
Sketch map of the Snowdon massif Legend ·grey: ridges ·red lines: paths ·orange lines: roads ·dotted grey line: Snowdon Mountain Railway

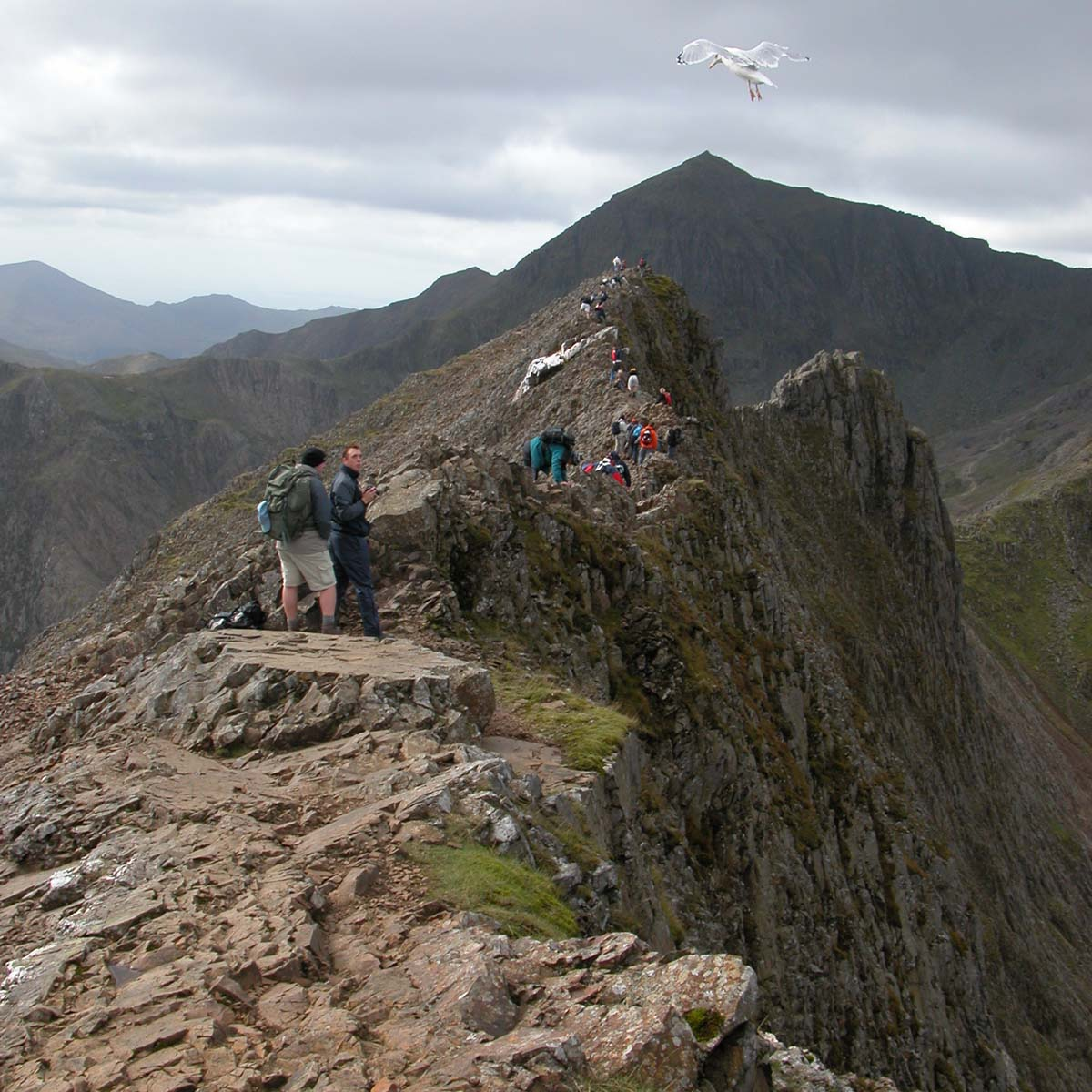
The ‘knife-edge’ arête of Crib Goch (foreground) and the pyramidal peak of Snowdon (background) are both the result of glaciation.

The classic traverse of Crib Goch from East to West leads up from the Pyg track to a ‘bad step’, where hands and feet are both needed briefly. It is followed by ascent to the arête, before tackling three rock-pinnacles to a grassy col at Bwlch Coch. This first part of the ridge is exposed with precipices below, having resulted in several fatalities, even of experienced mountaineers; the Snowdonia National Park Authority describes it as ‘not a mountain for the inexperienced’. It is also possible to ascend Crib Goch's North Ridge, which adjoins the main ridge. The route is far more difficult in high winds or frozen ground, and so it is recommended that walkers check the weather forecast beforehand.

It is possible to ascend Crib Goch from Bwlch y Moch SH663552 or from Nant Peris, an ascent via Cwm Beudu Mawr.

From the col the ridge rises again, joining the main Snowdon ridge via the sister peak Garnedd Ugain in the west. Here the path meets the Pyg Track (which descends to Pen-y-Pass) at Bwlch Glas (marked by a large standing stone), before the final climb to Snowdon summit. To the south of the arête lie the lakes of Glaslyn and Llyn Llydaw. To the north is the Llanberis Pass. Crib Goch is classed as a Welsh 3000er and is also often climbed as the first part of the Snowdon Horseshoe, which goes on over Garnedd Ugain, Snowdon and Y Lliwedd, before returning to Pen-y-Pass.

Crib Goch is one of the wettest spots in the United Kingdom, with an average of 4,473 millimetres (176.1 in) rainfall a year over the past 30 years.
