= Snowdon =

Mountain in Snowdonia, Wales

- Yr Wyddfa (Welsh)
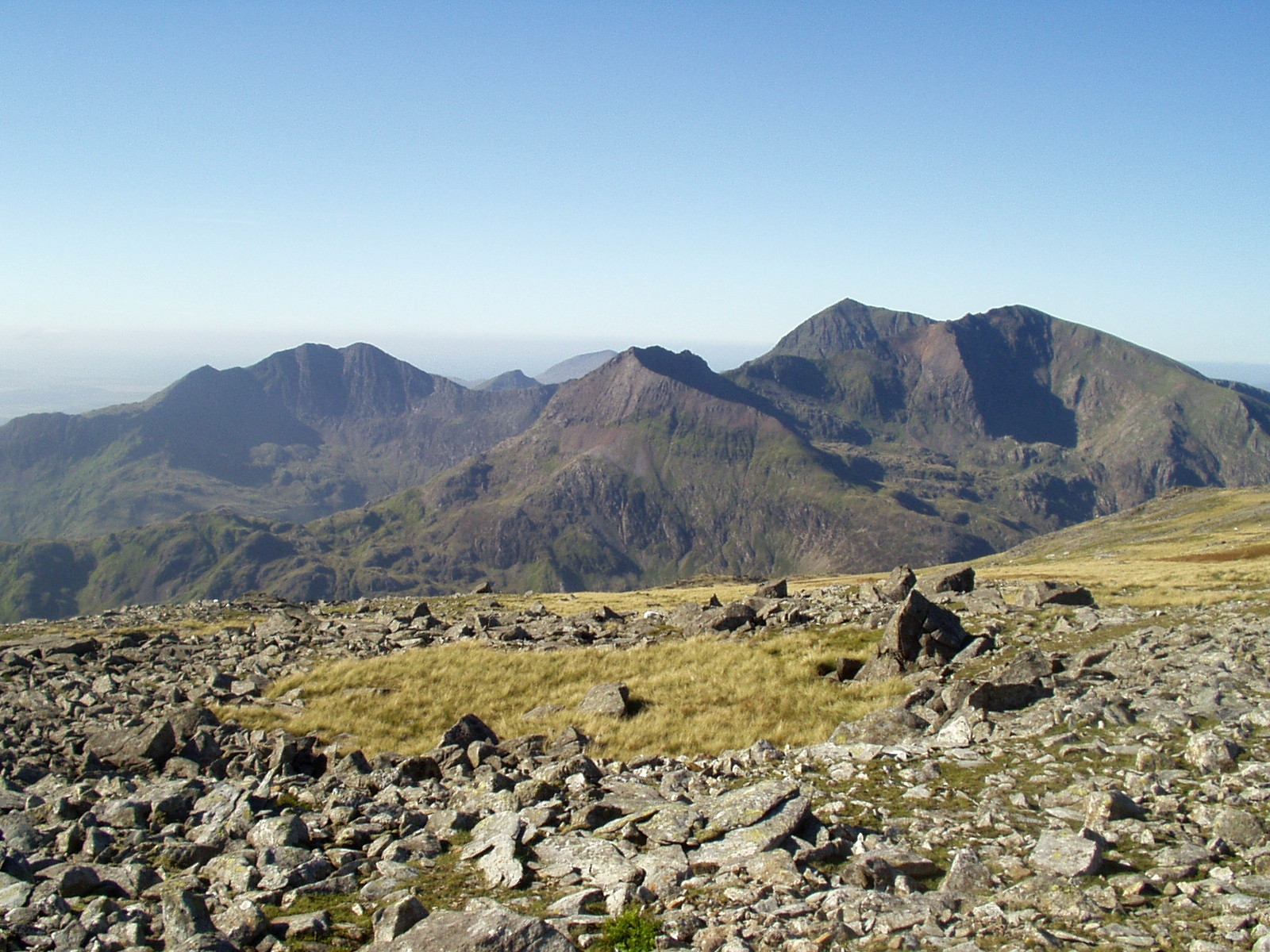
- The Snowdon group viewed from the north-east left to right Y Lliwedd, Crib Goch, Yr Wyddfa (the summit), Garnedd Ugain

Highest point
- Elevation: 1,084.74 m (3,558.9 ft) (Note: The last 1:25,000 O.S. map to be published in imperial measurements (i.e. showing contours and heights in feet) was issued in 1982, and showed Snowdon's height as 3,559 ft (measured by the O.S in 1961 at 1,084.74 m). The following edition, revised in 1983 and published in 1984, was metric and showed Snowdon's height rounded up to 1,085 m. Satellite measurement in 2014 confirmed the height to be 1,084.87 m, i.e. 3,559.28 ft)
- Prominence: 1,039 m (3,409 ft); Ranked joint 3rd in British Isles
- Parent peak: Ben Nevis
- Isolation: 368.7 km (229.1 mi)
- Listing: Marilyn, Ribu, Furth, Hewitt, Nuttall, Welsh 3000s, council top,
- Coordinates: 53°4′6.59″N 4°4′34.43″W

Geography
- Location within Gwynedd Location within Wales Location within the United Kingdom
- Location: Gwynedd, Wales
- Parent range: Snowdonia
- OS grid: SH6098954379
- Topo map: OS Landranger 115, Explorer OL17

Climbing
- Easiest route: Llanberis Path

Listed summits of Snowdon
Name	Grid ref	Height	Status
Crib y Ddysgl	SH610551	1,065 m (3,494 ft)	Welsh 3000s, Hewitt, Nuttall
Crib Goch	SH624551	923 m (3,028 ft)	Welsh 3000s, Hewitt, Nuttall
Craig Fach	SH635552	609 m (1,998 ft)	sub-Hewitt

Snowdon (/ˈsnoʊdən/), or Yr Wyddfa (Welsh: [ər ˈʊɨ̞̯ðva]), is a mountain in Snowdonia in North Wales. With an elevation of 1,085 metres (3,560 ft) above sea level, it is the highest mountain in Wales, and the highest in the British Isles south of the Scottish Highlands. Snowdon is designated a national nature reserve for its rare flora and fauna, and is located within Snowdonia National Park.

The rocks that form Snowdon were produced by volcanoes in the Ordovician period, and the massif has been extensively sculpted by glaciation, forming the pyramidal peak of Snowdon and the arêtes of Crib Goch and Y Lliwedd. It is part of the larger Snowdon range, which includes Garnedd Ugain, Yr Aran, and Moel Eilio. There are several lakes on the mountain, the largest of which is Llyn Llydaw (110 acres (45 ha)), located on the eastern flank at 1,430 ft (440 m).

The mountain has been described as the "busiest in the United Kingdom", and in 2022 it was climbed by 543,541 walkers. There are six main paths to the summit, the most popular of which begins in the village of Llanberis to the north. The summit can also be reached using the Snowdon Mountain Railway, which carried 98,567 passengers in 2021. The rack railway, which opened in 1896, operates over 4 3/4 miles (7.6 kilometres), from Llanberis to the Summit station. It generally operates from March to the end of October, with trains running to the summit station from May. The cliff faces on Snowdon, including Clogwyn Du'r Arddu, are significant for rock climbing, and the mountain was used by Edmund Hillary in training for the 1953 ascent of Mount Everest. The mountain, alongside Ben Nevis in Scotland and Scafell Pike in England, is climbed as part of the National Three Peaks Challenge.

== Toponymy ==
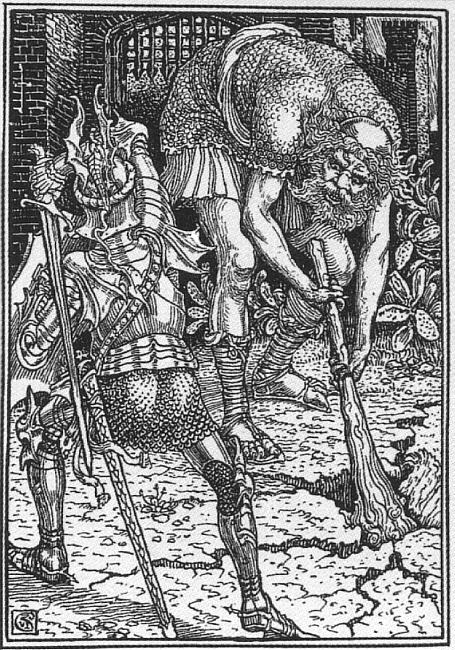
Illustration of King Arthur battling a giant

The name "Snowdon" is first recorded in 1095 as Snawdune, derived from the Old English elements snaw and dun, meaning "snow hill". The mountain is sometimes referred to as "Mount Snowdon", a name shared with mountains in Canada and New Zealand, but this usage is considered incorrect by some of whose who have written about the mountain.

An early source for the Welsh language name of the mountain, "Yr Wyddfa", is a Latin charter belonging to Aberconwy Abbey, which lists caput Wedua Vaur as one of the boundaries of the abbey's lands. The charter is dated 1198; however, this date has been disputed by Colin Gresham, who dates it to the early thirteenth century, and Charles Insley and Huw Pryce, who date it to the period immediately following the conquest of Gwynedd by Edward I in 1282–3. Gresham, citing Ifor Williams, considers capud to be a translation of Welsh pen y, and states that Wedua Vaur gives the modern Wyddfa Fawr.

The element gwyddfa in this context means 'height, promontory', and also appears in the Welsh name for the town of Mold, Yr Wyddgrug. Gwyddfa later developed the meaning "burial cairn", and there is a legend that the giant Rhita is buried under the mountain's summit cairn. One legend claims that Rhita was defeated and buried on the mountain by King Arthur, and another states that Rhita was killed by the giant Idris who lived on the mountain Cadair Idris. The mountain is also linked to other figures from Arthurian legend, a legendary Afanc (water monster) and the Tylwyth Teg (fairies).

In November 2022, the national park authority announced that it would refer to the mountain exclusively as "Yr Wyddfa". Following a two-year transition period, in November 2024, the Eryri National Park Authority announced that the name would be kept, following its success in gaining support and adoption by businesses and media.

== Environment ==
=== Geography and geology ===
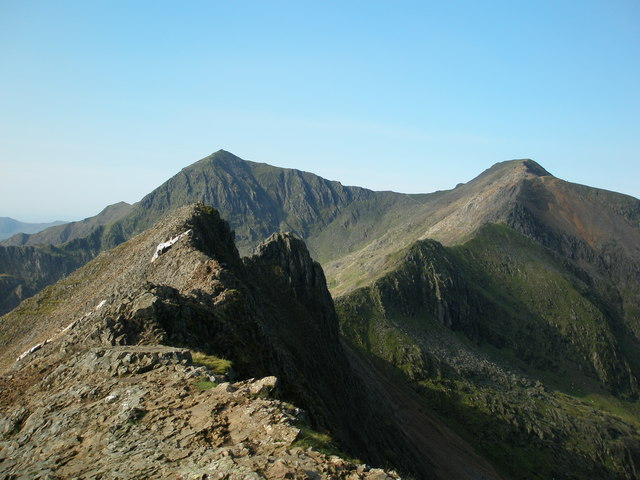
The "knife-edge" arête of Crib Goch (foreground) and the pyramidal peak of Snowdon (background) are both the result of glaciation

A 1682 survey estimated that the summit of Snowdon was at an elevation of 3,720 feet (1,130 m); in 1773, Thomas Pennant quoted a later estimate of 3,568 ft (1,088 m) above sea level at Caernarfon. It was long believed to be the tallest mountain on the island of Great Britain until measurements taken in the 18th century confirmed that Ben Nevis and several other Scottish peaks were taller. Recent surveys give the height of the summit as 1,085 m (3,560 ft), making Snowdon the highest mountain in Wales, and the highest point in the British Isles outside Scotland.

The rocks which today make up Snowdon and its neighbouring mountains were formed in the Ordovician Period. At that time, most of modern-day Wales was near the edge of Avalonia, submerged beneath the ancient Iapetus Ocean. In the Soudleyan (former British regional) stage (458 to 457 million years ago) of the Caradoc (British regional) epoch, a volcanic caldera formed, and produced ash flows of rhyolitic tuff, which formed deposits up to 500 metres (1,600 ft) thick. The current summit is near the northern edge of the ancient caldera; the caldera's full extent is unclear, but it extended as far as the summit of Moel Hebog in the south-west.

Snowdon and its surrounding peaks have been described as "true examples of Alpine topography". The summits of Snowdon and Garnedd Ugain are surrounded by cwms, rounded valleys scooped out by glaciation. Erosion by glaciers in adjacent cwms caused the characteristic arêtes of Crib Goch, Crib y Ddysgl and Y Lliwedd, and the pyramidal peak of Snowdon itself. Other glacial landforms that can be seen around Snowdon include roches moutonnées, glacial erratics and moraines.

=== Climate ===
In winter, Snowdon often has a covering of snow (giving rise to its English name). Although the amount of snow on Snowdon in winter varies significantly, 55% less snow fell in 2004 than in 1994. The slopes of Snowdon have one of the wettest climates in Great Britain, receiving an annual average of more than 5,100 mm (200 in) of precipitation.

=== Flora and fauna ===
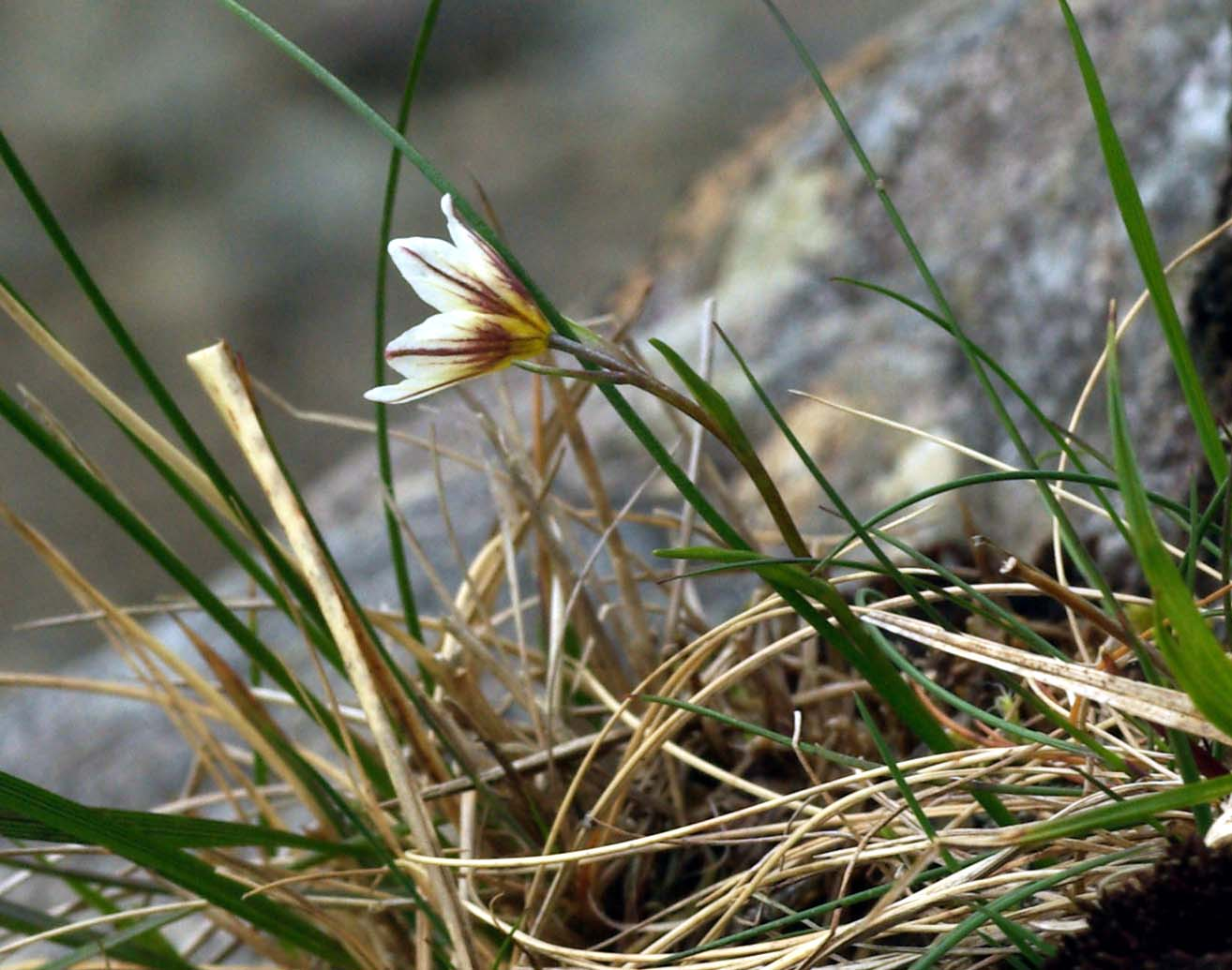
Gagea serotina (the "Snowdon lily") grows on the cliffs of Snowdon.

The environment of Snowdon, particularly its rare plants, has led to the designation of much of the eastern part of the massif as a national nature reserve. In addition to plants that are widespread in Snowdonia, Snowdon is home to some plants rarely found elsewhere in Britain. These include the "Snowdon lily", Gagea serotina, which is also found in the Alps and in North America; it was first discovered in Wales by Edward Lhuyd, and the genus Lloydia (now included in Gagea) was later named in his honour by Richard Anthony Salisbury. Snowdon lies in the northern part of Snowdonia National Park, which has also provided some legal protection since the park's establishment in 1951.

Otters, polecats, and goats have been seen near or on the mountain, although pine martens have not been seen for many years. Birds that can be seen include the raven, red-billed chough, peregrine, osprey, merlin, red kite and moorland birds.

=== Lakes ===
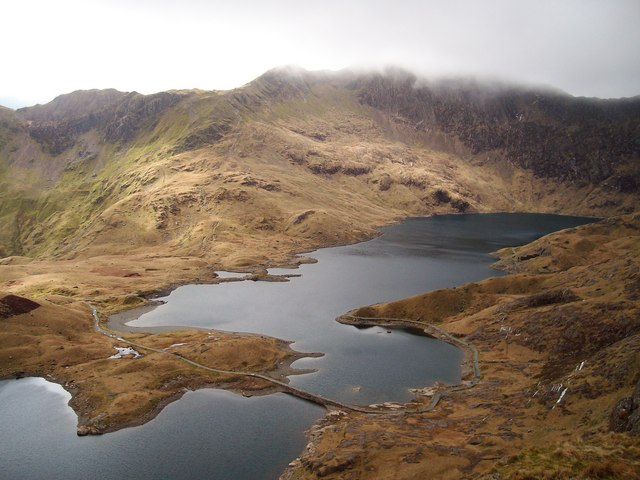
Llyn Llydaw, the largest and deepest lake on Snowdon's flanks, is crossed by a causeway at its eastern end.

A number of lakes are found in the various cwms of the Snowdon range:

- Llyn Llydaw – 1,430 ft (440 m) high, 110 acres (45 ha) – lies in Cwm Dyli, Snowdon's eastern cwm, and is one of Snowdonia's deepest lakes, at up to 190 ft (58 m) deep. Various explanations of its name have been put forward, including lludw ("ash"), from ashen deposits along the shore, to Llydaw ("Brittany"). It contains evidence of a crannog settlement, and was the location of a 10-by-2-foot (3 m × 0.6 m) dugout canoe described in the Cambrian Journal in 1862. The lake is significantly coloured by washings from the copper mines nearby, and is used by the Cwm Dyli hydroelectric power station, which opened in 1906. The lake is crossed by a causeway, built in 1853 and raised in the 20th century to prevent the causeway from flooding frequently.
- Glaslyn – 1,970 feet (600 m) high, 18 acres (7.3 ha) – lies higher up Cwm Dyli than Llyn Llydaw. It was originally called Llyn y Ffynnon Glas, and has a depth of 127 feet (39 m). For a long time, it was believed to be bottomless, and is also the location for various myths.
- Llyn Ffynnon-y-gwas – 1,430 feet (440 m) high, 10 acres (4.0 ha) – lies in Cwm Treweunydd, Snowdon's north-western cwm, and is passed by the Snowdon Ranger path. It was enlarged by damming for use as a reservoir by slate quarries, but the level has since been lowered, and the lake's volume reduced to 24,000 cubic metres (850,000 cu ft).

Other lakes include: Llyn Du'r Arddu below Clogwyn Du'r Arddu, at a height of 1,901 feet (579 m), 5 acres (2.0 ha); Llyn Teyrn near Pen-y-pass, at a height of 1,237 feet (377 m), 5 acres (2.0 ha); and several smaller pools.

== Leisure activities ==
Snowdon has been described as "the busiest mountain in Britain", with some 543,541 people having walked up the mountain in 2022. There are six main walking paths, which can be combined in various ways. In addition, the circular walk starting and ending at Pen-y-Pass and using the Crib Goch route and the route over Y Lliwedd, both of which involve scrambling, is called the Snowdon Horseshoe, and is considered "one of the finest ridge walks in Britain". The routes are arranged here anticlockwise, starting with the path leading from Llanberis. In winter conditions, all these routes become significantly more dangerous and the Llanberis Mountain Rescue Team state that "additional skills, equipment and knowledge are required". Many inexperienced walkers have been killed over the years attempting to climb the mountain via the main paths.

The mountain itself may also be viewed on takeoff and approach to both Manchester Airport and Liverpool John Lennon Airport on very clear days, and even from Howth Head in Dublin, Ireland.

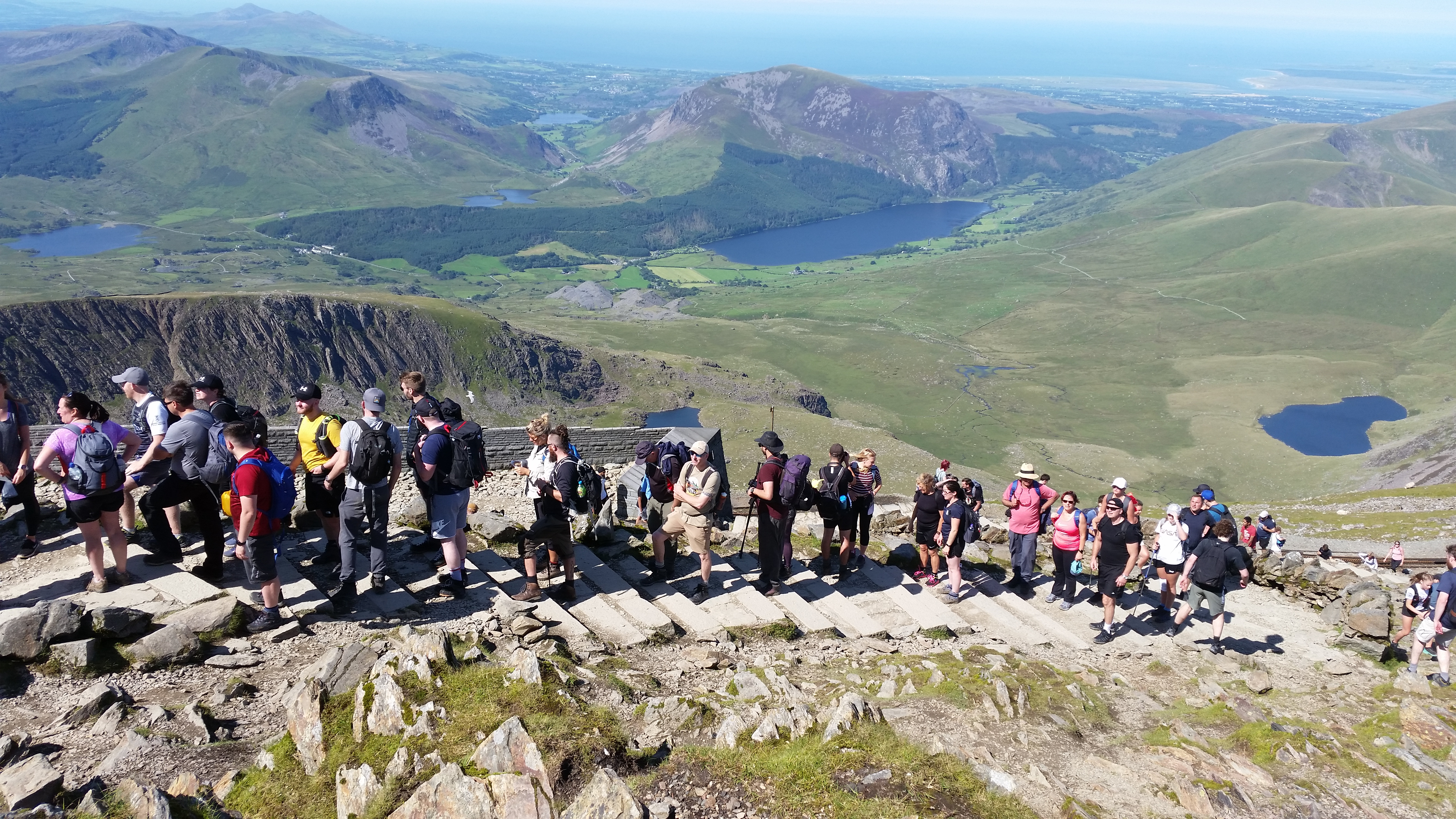
Part of the queue for the summit pillar in August 2020

On 26 June 2018, Sam Laming became the first ever Wingsuit pilot to perform a 'Proximity Flight' over a UK mountain, by flying approximately 30 metres over Snowdon's summit, after jumping from a helicopter with fellow wingsuit camera pilot, Mike Hitchcock.

In 2021, John Harold, the director of the Snowdonia Society, reported that the number of visitors ascending Snowdon was exceeding capacity. At popular times walkers queue for upwards of 45 minutes for an opportunity to take a photo at the summit pillar.

=== Rock climbing ===
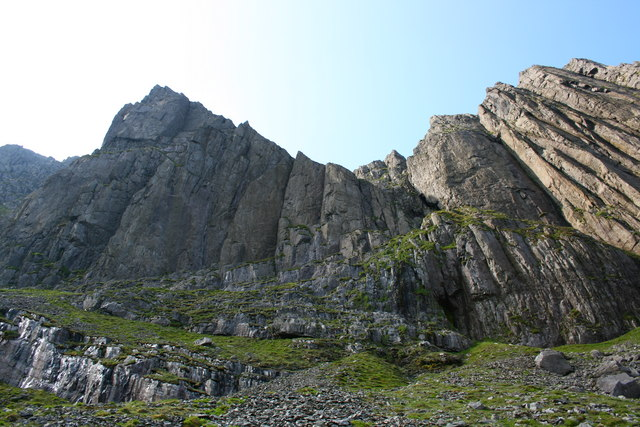
Clogwyn Du'r Arddu A rock climbing site

The Snowdon Massif includes a number of cliffs, and holds an important place in the history of rock climbing in the United Kingdom. Clogwyn Du'r Arddu, often colloquially known as 'Cloggy' among climbers, was the site of the first recorded climb in Britain, in 1798. It was carried out by Peter Bailey Williams and William Bingley, while searching for rare plants. It is now considered to be one of the best cliffs in Britain for rock climbing.

Y Lliwedd was also explored by early climbers, and was the subject of a 1909 climbing guide, The Climbs on Lliwedd by J. M. A. Thompson and A. W. Andrews, one of the first in Britain. Snowdon was used by Edmund Hillary and his group during preparations for their successful 1953 expedition to climb Mount Everest.

=== Paths ===
Sketch map of the Snowdon Massif Legend: grey: ridges; red lines: paths; orange lines: roads; dotted grey line: Snowdon Mountain Railway

The first recorded ascent of Snowdon was by the botanist Thomas Johnson in 1639. However, the 18th-century Welsh historian Thomas Pennant mentions a "triumphal fair upon this our chief of mountains" following Edward I's conquest of Wales in 1284, which could indicate the possibility of earlier ascents.

The six main paths were mapped using Google Trekker in 2015. The elevations and gradients given here are for the start point on a public road, based on Ordnance Survey mapping. Other definitions are possible so alternative figures can be found.

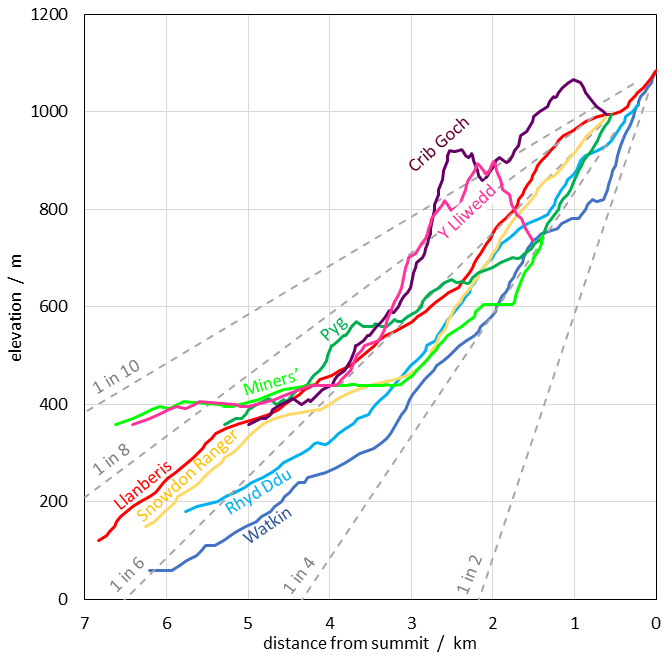
Profiles of the main routes up Snowdon

==== Llanberis Path ====
Length: 6.8 km (4.2 mi). Elevation gain: 965 m (3,166 ft). Overall gradient: 1 in 7.1 (14.1%).

The Llanberis Path is the longest route to the summit. It follows close to the line of the railway, and being the easiest ascent, it is the route used by the annual Snowdon Race, which has a record time of less than 40 minutes recorded from the start to the summit.

The section of the Llanberis Path above Clogwyn station has long been called the "Killer Convex"; in icy conditions, this convex slope can send unwary walkers over the cliffs of Clogwyn Du'r Arddu. Four people died there in February 2009.

==== Snowdon Ranger Path ====
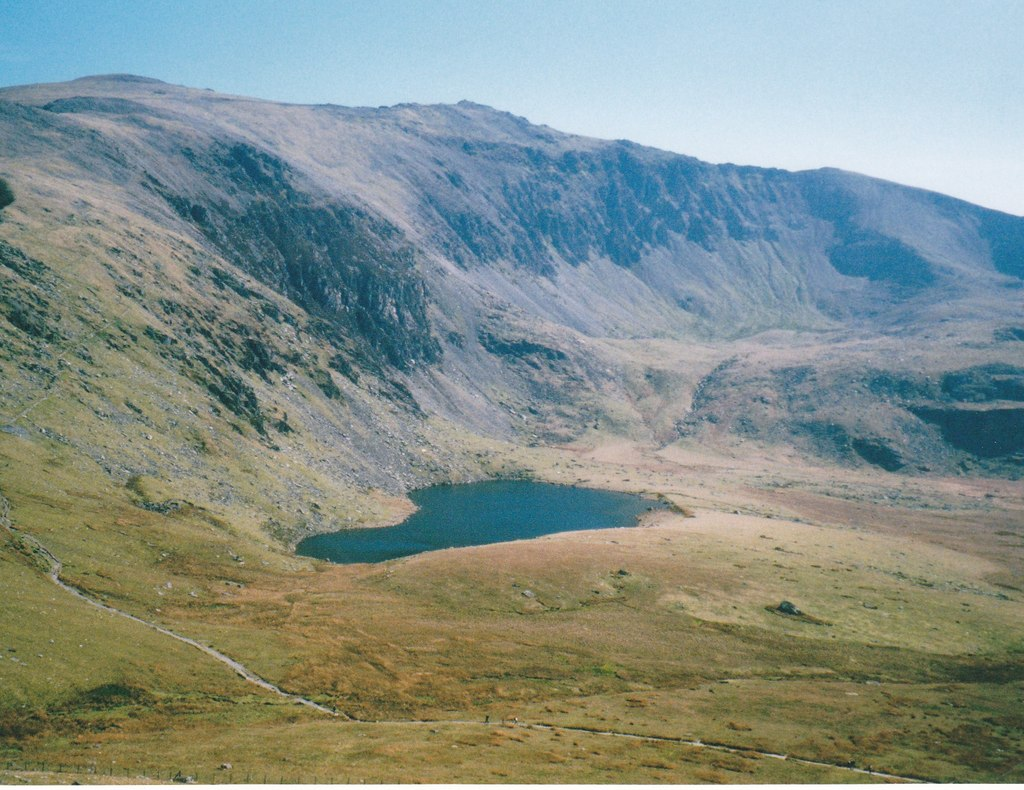
The Snowdon Ranger Path crosses a boggy area before ascending past Llyn Ffynnon-y-gwas.

Length: 6.3 km (3.9 mi). Elevation gain: 935 m (3,068 ft). Overall gradient: 1 in 6.7 (14.9%).

The Snowdon Ranger Path (Welsh: Llwybr Cwellyn) begins at the youth hostel beside Llyn Cwellyn, to the west of the mountain, served by the A4085 and Snowdon Ranger railway station. This was formerly the Saracen's Head Inn, but was renamed under the ownership of the mountain guide John Morton. It is thought to be the oldest path to the summit.

The route begins with zigzags through turf, before reaching a flatter boggy area in front of Llyn Ffynnon-y-gwas. The path then climbs to Bwlch Cwm Brwynog, and then snakes along the ridge above Clogwyn Du'r Arddu towards the summit. This path meets the railway, the Llanberis Path, the Crib Goch path, and the combined Pyg Track and Miners' Track all within a short distance, just below the summit.

==== Rhyd Ddu path ====
Length: 5.8 km (3.6 mi). Elevation gain: 905 m (2,969 ft) or 896 m (2,940 ft) depending on exact start point. Overall gradient: 1 in 6.4 (15.7%).

The Rhyd Ddu path, formerly called the Beddgelert Path, leads from the village of Rhyd Ddu, west of Snowdon, gently up on to Llechog, a broad ridge dropping west from the summit. It is considered one of the easier routes to the summit, with the advantage that the summit is visible from the start, but is one of the least used routes. It climbs at a shallow gradient to Bwlch Main, shortly southwest of the summit, from where it climbs more steeply, meeting up with the Watkin Path at a site marked with a large standing stone a few hundred metres from the summit. An alternative start begins at Pitt's Head on the A4085 road.

==== Watkin Path ====
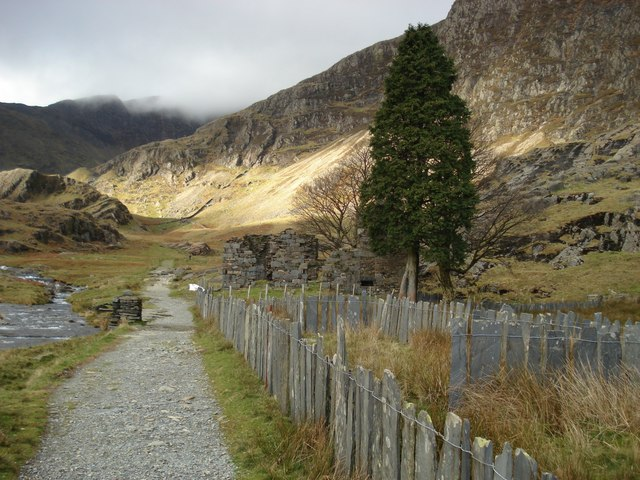
Plas Cwmllan (right) and Gladstone Rock (left) in Cwm Llan, looking along the Watkin Path

Length: 6.2 km (3.9 mi). Elevation gain: 1,025 m (3,363 ft). Overall gradient: 1 in 6.1 (16.5%).

The Watkin Path is "the most demanding route direct to the summit of Snowdon", since it starts at the lowest elevation of any of the main routes and has the steepest overall gradient. It was first conceived by Sir Edward Watkin, a railway owner who had attempted to build a railway tunnel under the English Channel, and had a summer home in Nant Gwynant near the start of the path. It was originally designed as a donkey track and opened in 1892.

The start of the Watkin Path has been described as "the prettiest beginning" of the routes up Snowdon. It begins at Bethania on the A498 and climbs initially through old broadleaved woodland. After leaving the woods, the path climbs past the waterfalls of the Afon Llan to the glacial cirque of Cwm Llan, crossing a disused incline from an abandoned slate quarry. It then reaches Plas Cwmllan, formerly the home of the quarry manager for the South Snowdon Slate Works beyond, and later used for target practice by commandos during the Second World War. Near Plas Cwmllan is the large boulder known as Gladstone Rock, which bears a plaque commemorating a speech given in 1892 by William Ewart Gladstone, the then 82-year-old Prime Minister, on the subject of Justice for Wales. The slate workings in Cwm Llan were opened in 1840, but closed in 1882 due to the expense of transporting the slate to the sea at Porthmadog. Various buildings, including barracks and dressing sheds, remain.

From the slate quarries, the Watkin Path veers to the north-east to reach Bwlch Ciliau, the col between Snowdon and Y Lliwedd, which is marked by a large orange-brown cairn. From here, it heads west to meet the Rhyd Ddu Path at a standing stone shortly below the summit of Snowdon.

==== Over Y Lliwedd ====
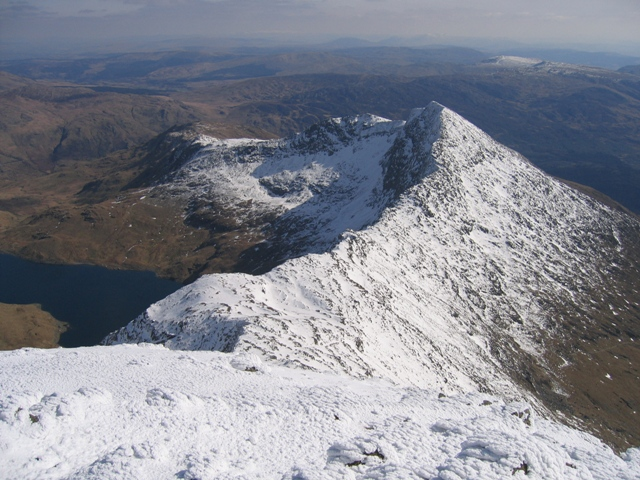
Y Lliwedd In early spring

Length: 6.4 km (4.0 mi).

The route over Y Lliwedd is more frequently used for descent than ascent, and forms the second half of the Snowdon Horseshoe walk, the ascent being over Crib Goch. It is reached from the summit by following the Watkin Path down to Bwlch y Saethau, and then continuing along the ridge to the twin summits of Y Lliwedd. The path then drops down to Cwm Dyli to join the Miners' Track towards Pen-y-Pass.

==== Miners' Track ====
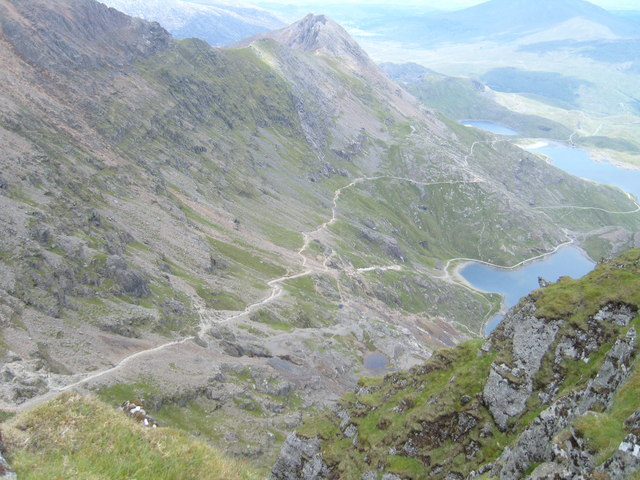
The Pyg Track (above) and Miners Track (below) merge above Glaslyn. Crib Goch is visible at the top.

Length: 6.6 km (4.1 mi). Elevation gain: 726 m (2,382 ft). Overall gradient: 1 in 9.1 (10.9%).

The Miners' Track (Welsh: Llwybr y Mwynwyr) begins at the car park at Pen-y-Pass, at an elevation of around 360 m (1,180 ft), and has the shallowest overall gradient. It begins by skirting Llyn Teyrn before climbing slightly to cross the causeway over Llyn Llydaw. It follows the lake's shoreline before climbing to Glaslyn, from where it ascends steeply towards Bwlch Glas. It is joined for most of this zigzag ascent by the Pyg Track, and on reaching the summit ridge, is united with the Llanberis Path and Snowdon Ranger Path. Derelict mine buildings are encountered along several parts of the path.

==== Pyg Track ====
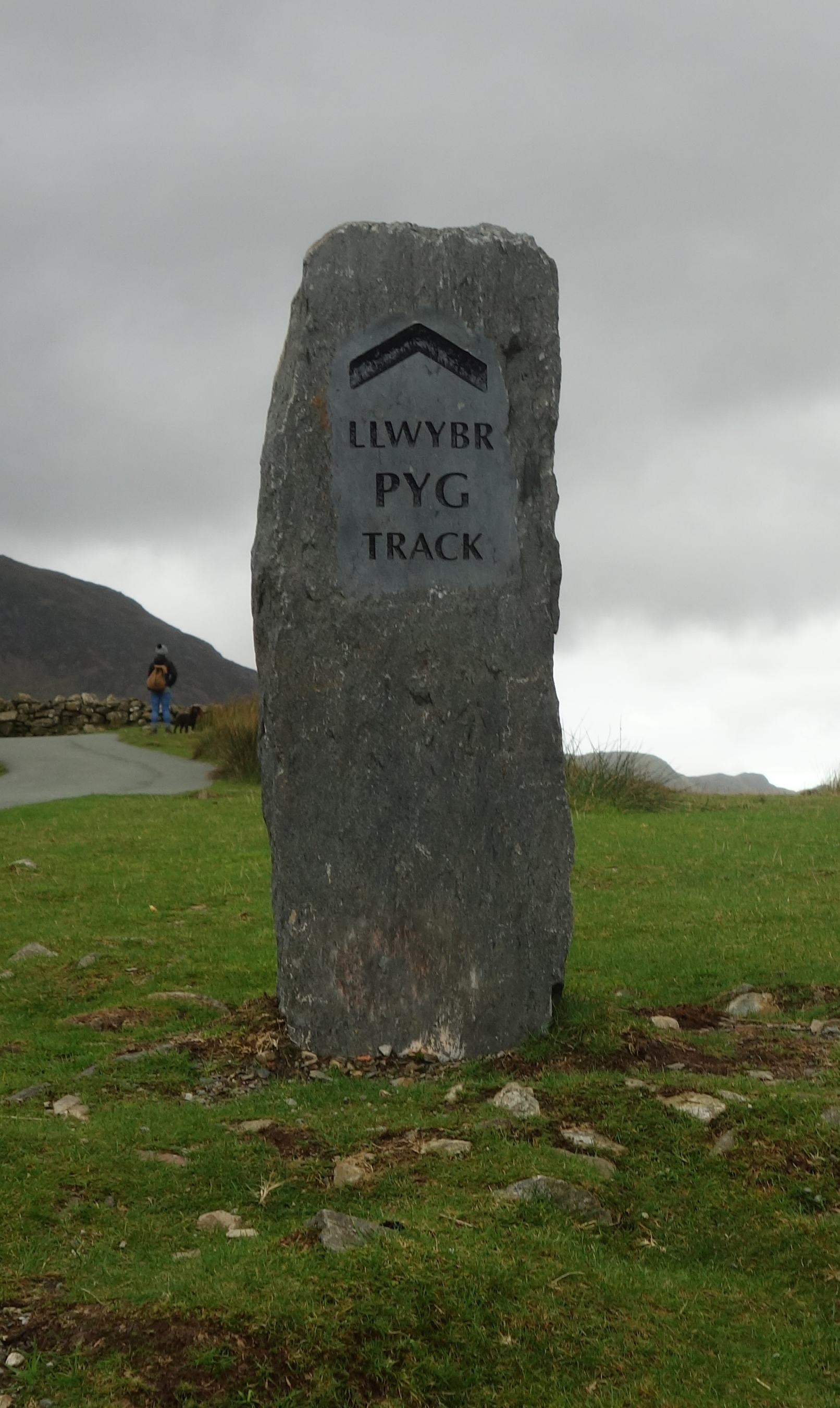
Standing stone marking the start of the Pyg Track at Pen-y-Pass

Length: 5.3 km (3.3 mi). Elevation gain: 726 m (2,382 ft). Overall gradient: 1 in 7.3 (13.7%).

The "Pyg Track" (Welsh: Llwybr Pyg), or "Pig Track" (both spellings may be encountered), also leads from Pen-y-Pass. The track climbs over Bwlch y Moch on the eastern flanks of Crib Goch, before traversing that ridge's lower slopes. Above Glaslyn, it is joined by the Miners' Track for the zigzag climb to Bwlch Glas between Snowdon and Garnedd Ugain, where it joins the combined Llanberis and Snowdon Ranger paths.

From the website of the Snowdonia National Park Authority,

Nobody knows for certain why this path is called the Pyg Track. It's possible that it was named after the pass it leads through, Bwlch y Moch (translated Pigs' Pass) as the path is sometimes spelled 'Pig Track'. Or, maybe because it was used to carry 'pyg' (black tar) to the copper mines on Snowdon. Another possible explanation is that the path was named after the nearby Pen y Gwryd Hotel, popular amongst the early mountain walkers.

— Snowdonia National Park Authority

==== Crib Goch ====
Length: 5.0 km (3.1 mi).

The traverse of Crib Goch has been described as "one of the finest ridge walks in Britain", and forms part of the Snowdon Horseshoe, a circuit of the peaks surrounding Cwm Dyli. The path follows the Pyg Track before separating off from it at Bwlch y Moch and leading up the East ridge of Crib Goch. After the Crib Goch ridge, it descends slightly to Bwlch Coch, then ascends to the peak of Garnedd Ugain (1,065 m or 3,494 ft), before dropping to join the Llanberis path. All routes which tackle Crib Goch are considered mountaineering routes or scrambles.

== Snowdon Mountain Railway ==
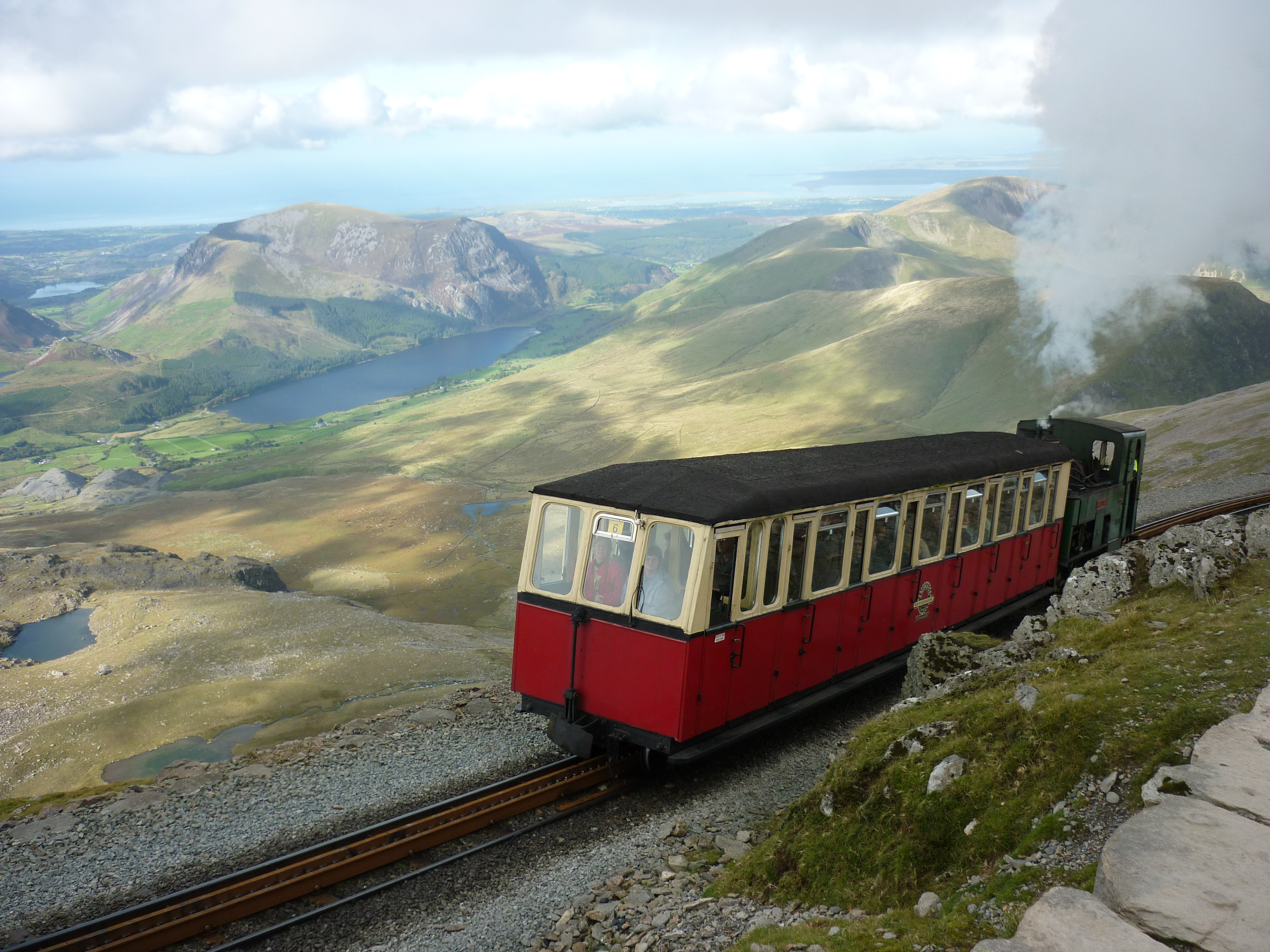
Approaching the Summit railway station

The Snowdon Mountain Railway (SMR) (Welsh: Rheilffordd yr Wyddfa) is a narrow-gauge rack-and-pinion mountain railway that travels for 4 3/4 miles (7.6 km) from Llanberis to the Summit station of Snowdon. It is the only public rack and pinion railway in the United Kingdom, and after more than 100 years of operation it remains a popular tourist attraction, carrying more than 130,000 passengers annually. Single carriage trains are pushed up the mountain by either steam locomotives or diesel locomotives. It has also previously used diesel railcars as multiple units. The railway was constructed between December 1894, when the first sod was cut by Enid Assheton-Smith (after whom locomotive No.2 was named), and February 1896, at a total cost of £63,800 (equivalent to £7,338,000 as of 2025).

=== Summit ===
Hafod Eryri
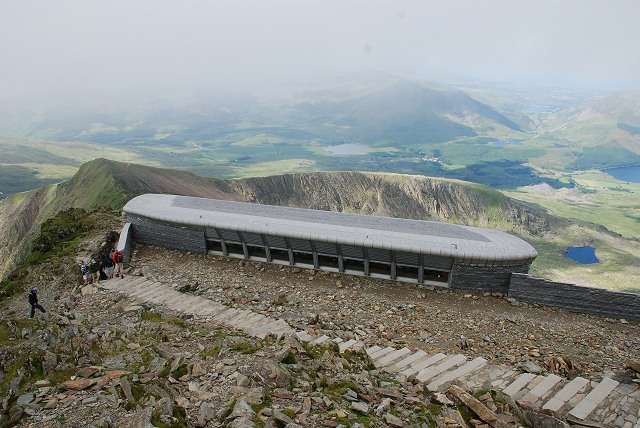
- Hafod Eryri (2009)

General information
- Location: via Snowdon Mountain Railway, Llanberis, Caernarfon, Gwynedd, LL55 4TY
- Coordinates: 53.068865°N 4.075588°W
- Elevation: 1,065 m (3,494 ft)
- Opened: 12 June 2009
- Cost: £8.4m

Design and construction
- Architecture firm: Ray Hole Architects
- Structural engineer: Arup
- Main contractor: Carillion
- Awards: RIBA Welsh Architecture Award 2010

Website
- Hafod Eryri Visitor Centre

The first building to be erected at the Snowdon summit was a stone beehive-shaped shelter in c1815; the first wooden huts, built to sell refreshments, appeared in the early 1840s, (Note: The date of "about 1837 or 1838", given by David Jenkins in his Bedd Gelert: Its Facts, Fairies and Folklore (1899) was based on recollection over half a century later, and contemporary newspaper articles have shown this date to be incorrect.) and a licence to sell intoxicating liquor was granted in 1845. Very basic accommodation was also provided for visitors. When the Snowdon Mountain Railway was opened in 1896, the company strove to get an alcohol licence for its own proposed new hotel, but being unable to, took over both summit huts by 1898.

During the 1930s, many complaints were received about the state of the facilities at the summit and in 1934/5 a new station building was erected in two phases; the upstairs accommodation was completed in 1937. It was designed by Sir Clough Williams-Ellis and included rooms for visitors and a cafe. The other operators were bought out and the ramshackle collection of buildings on the summit was cleared. The flat roof was intended to be used as a viewing platform and some photographs show it being used in this way. However, other photographs taken of the cafe show that the roof leaked, which probably explains why the practice was stopped. The Summit was taken over by government agencies during the war and the accommodation was restricted to staff use afterwards. Having become increasingly dilapidated in post-war decades, this building was described by Prince Charles as "the highest slum in Wales". Its state led to a campaign to replace the building. In April 2006, Snowdonia National Park Authority, with the support of the Snowdonia Society, agreed a deal to start work on a new cafe and visitor centre complex. By mid-October 2006 the old building had been largely demolished.

The new RIBA Award-winning £8.4 million visitor centre, Hafod Eryri, designed by Ray Hole Architects in conjunction with Arup and built by Carillion, was officially opened on 12 June 2009 by First Minister Rhodri Morgan. The Welsh National Poet, Gwyn Thomas, composed a new couplet for the new building, displayed at its entrance and on the windows, which reads "Copa'r Wyddfa: yr ydych chwi, yma, Yn nes at y nefoedd / The summit of Snowdon: You are, here, nearer to Heaven". The name Hafod Eryri was chosen from several hundred put forward after a competition was held by the BBC. Hafod is Welsh for an upland summer residence, while Eryri is the Welsh name for Snowdonia.

The summit pillar was built in 2001, the brass toposcope carrying the date 2000. This plate details exactly 100 locations—mostly other peaks—which can be seen, given ideal visibility. Of the locations mentioned, Mount Leinster (in the Blackstairs Mountains in Ireland) is the furthest, at 188 miles away, with the Wicklow Mountains (also in Ireland) being 100 miles away. Slieve Donard, in Northern Ireland, is 108 miles away. The Lake District is 100 miles away, Penmaen Dewi (St David's Head in Pembrokeshire) is 96 miles away, Kinder Scout (in the Peak District) is 94 miles away, and the Isle of Man is 84 miles away.

Originally Snowdon and its summit were owned by three agricultural estates, Vaynol, Hafod y Llan and the Baron Hill Estate. Today the Vaynol land at the summit is owned by the Snowdonia National Park Authority, Hafod y Llan by the National Trust and the Baron Hill Estate retains its holding. The Baron Hill Estate land consists of the farm of Gwastadannas, which includes the Snowdon Horseshoe, Glaslyn, Llyn Llydaw and the northern end of Nant Gwynant.

== Welsh literature ==
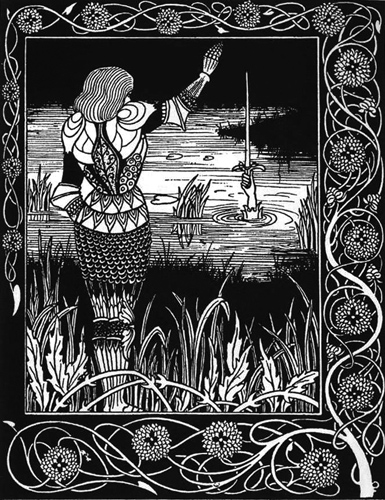
In Arthurian legend, Bedivere threw Excalibur into a lake identified by some as Glaslyn on the slopes of Snowdon.

In Welsh folklore, the summit of Snowdon is said to be the tomb of Rhitta Gawr, a giant. This is claimed to be the reason for the Welsh name Yr Wyddfa, literally meaning "the tumulus". Rhitta Gawr wore a cloak made of men's beards, and was slain by King Arthur after claiming Arthur's beard. Other sites with Arthurian connections include Bwlch y Saethau, on the ridge between Snowdon and Y Lliwedd, where Arthur himself is said to have died. A cairn, Carnedd Arthur, was erected at the site and was still standing as late as 1850, but no longer exists. According to the folklore, Arthur had Bedivere throw his sword Excalibur into Glaslyn, where Arthur's body was later placed in a boat to be carried away to Afallon. Arthur's men then retreated to a cave on the slopes of Y Lliwedd, where they are said to sleep until such time as they are needed. Merlin is supposed to have hidden the golden throne of Britain among the cliffs north of Crib y Ddysgl when the Saxons invaded. Glaslyn was also the final resting place of a water monster, known as an afanc (also the Welsh word for beaver), which had plagued the people of the Conwy valley. They tempted the monster out of the water with a young girl, before securing it with chains and dragging it to Glaslyn. A large stone known as Maen Du'r Arddu, below Clogwyn Du'r Arddu, is supposed to have magical powers. Like several other sites in Wales, it is said that if two people spend the night there, one will become a great poet while the other will become insane. Llyn Coch in Cwm Clogwyn has been associated with the Tylwyth Teg (fairies), including a version of the fairy bride legend.

== In popular culture ==
In 1968, scenes representing the Khyber Pass were filmed for Carry On... Up the Khyber on the lower part of the Watkin Path. In 2005, Angela Douglas, one of the stars of the film, unveiled a plaque at the precise location where filming took place to commemorate the location filming. It now forms part of the North Wales Film and Television Trail run by the Wales Screen Commission.

== In art ==
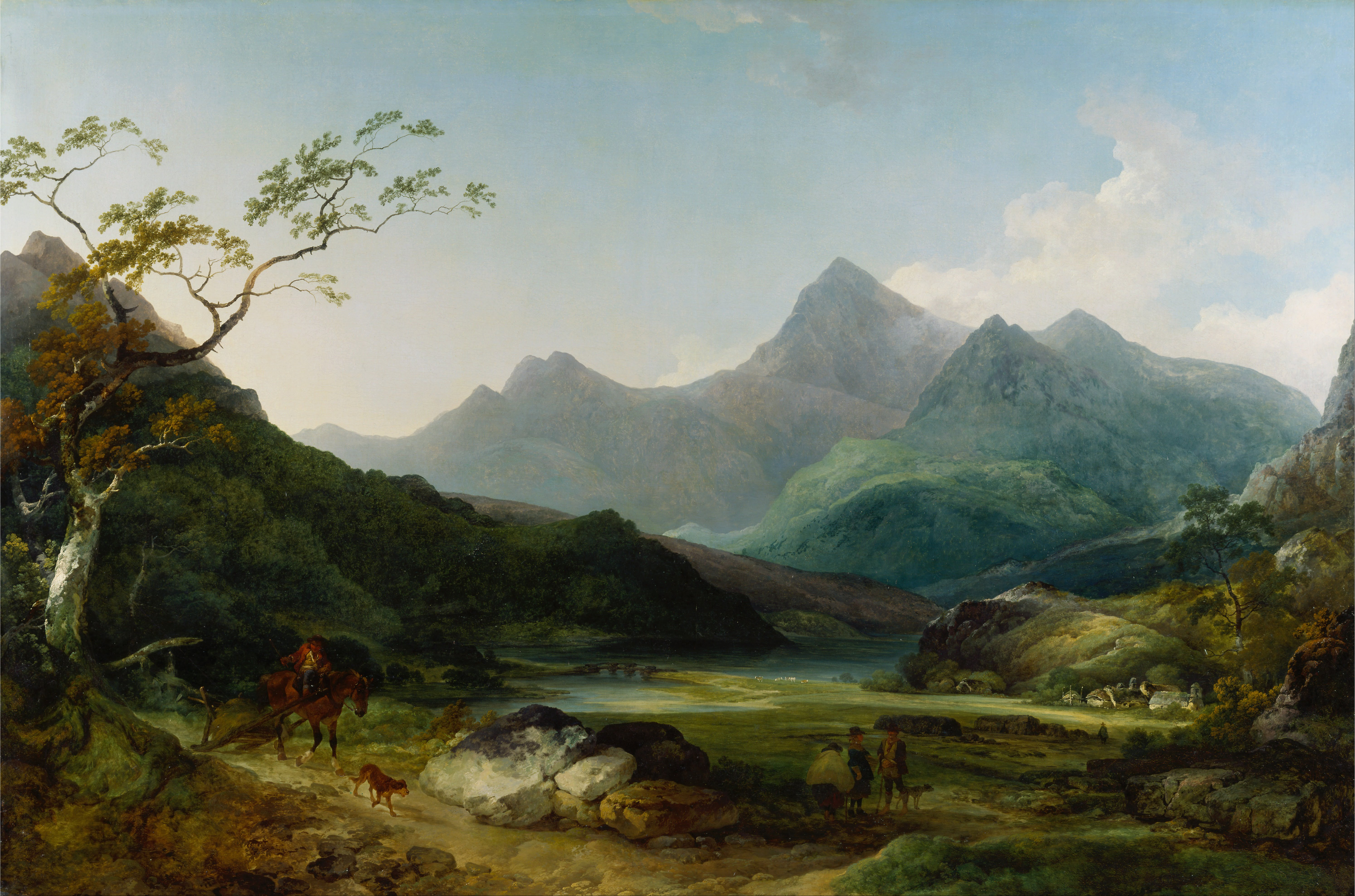
Snowdon from Capel Curig by Philip James de Loutherbourg, 1787

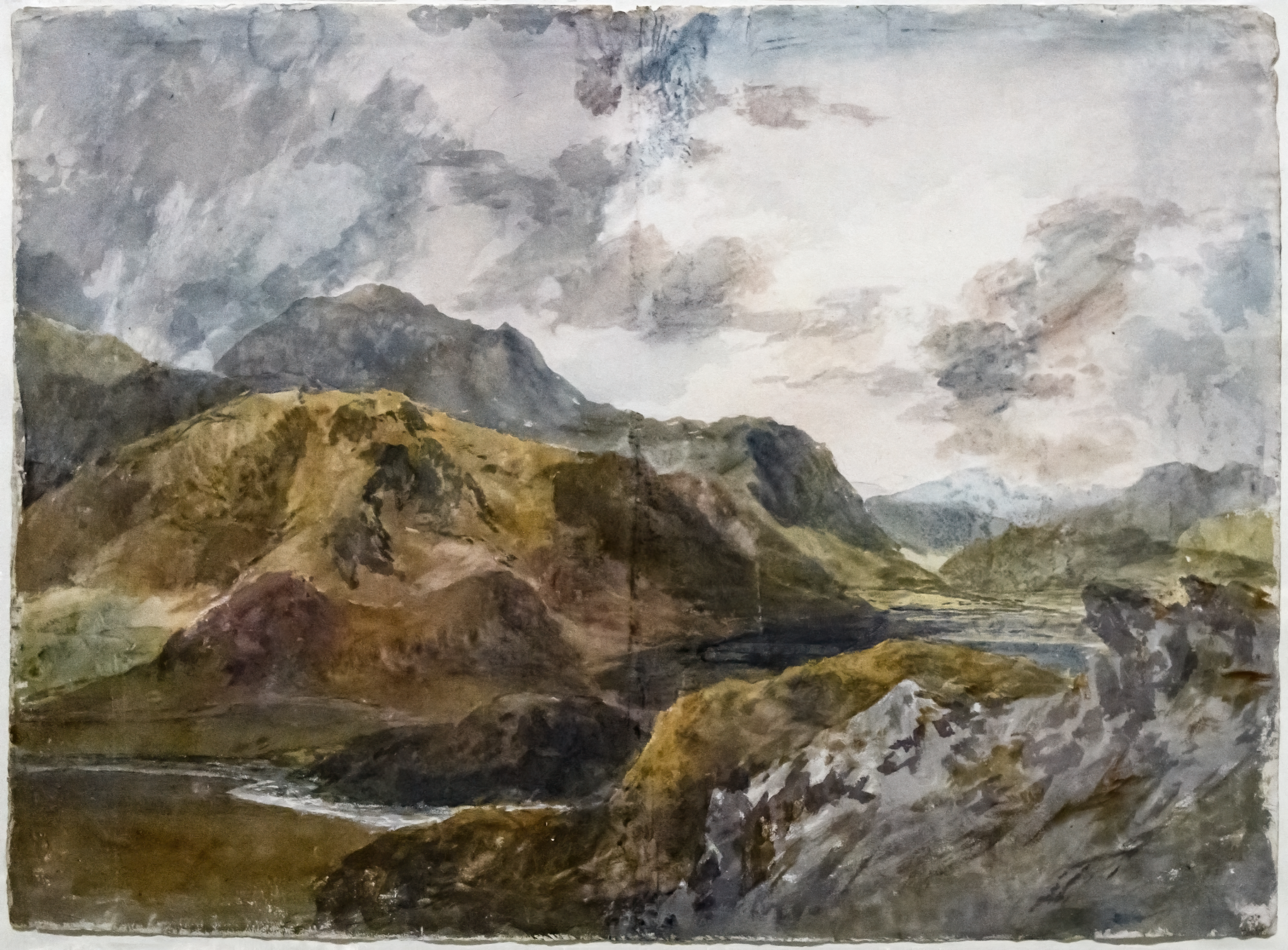
Snowdon and Dinas Emrys from Above Beddgelert – William Turner – Tate Britain

== Injuries and deaths ==
There are, on average, about 8 deaths every year on Snowdon.

In January and February 2009 on Snowdon there were four people who died and three of these four deaths were related to people falling. In 2021 there were four people who died on Snowdon.

In 2021 two people were injured and taken to hospital after being struck by lightning on top of Snowdon.

In 2026 two people died after being reported missing on the mountain.

== Use of Yr Wyddfa in English ==
Various forms of the Welsh name have appeared in England over the years. One of the earliest was Antiquarian John Leland who called the mountain as "'the greate Withaw hille".

George Borrow referred to the summit of the mountain as "Y Wyddfa" in his 1862 travel book Wild Wales:

Snowdon, or Eryri, is not a single hill but a mountainous region, the loftiest part of which is called Yr Wyddfa

In April 2021 a motion was put forward by Gwynedd Councillor John Pughe Roberts for Snowdon to be called by its Welsh name Yr Wyddfa in all official use, and for Snowdonia to similarly be known only as Eryri. The motion, however, was rejected as the National Park already had a task group looking at the use and retention of Welsh names. An earlier petition calling for the National Park Authority to do this had been rejected by the Senedd the previous year after it was found to be the responsibility of the park itself, rather than the Welsh Government.

In May 2021, following the dismissal of the motion, YouGov conducted a poll on Snowdon's name. Sixty per cent of Welsh adults supported the English name Snowdon, compared to 30% wanting the Welsh name Yr Wyddfa. Separating by language, 59% of Welsh speakers preferred the Welsh name, while 37% wanted Snowdon to not be scrapped entirely; 69% of non-Welsh speakers firmly supported Snowdon as the mountain's name.

In November 2022, Snowdonia National Park Authority voted to use Yr Wyddfa and Eryri (rather than Snowdon and Snowdonia) in its usage, though in statutory documents both Welsh and English will still be required by law.

In November 2024, the authority stated that the name change had been a "success" as many businesses and media had followed suit. The authority stated that a summer survey showed "strong support" from locals and visitors for the name change. While some concerns were raised over misconceptions by some that the Welsh names were new and mispronunciations, the authority stated that the change resulted in the park being more associated with a Welsh identity, and more different from other UK national parks. The authority is set to make a pronunciation guide and publish a report on the change.

== See also ==
- Ben Nevis
- Mountains and hills of Scotland
- Scafell Pike
- Slate industry in Wales
