= Snowdon Massif =

Mountain group in Wales

Coordinates: 53.0846°N 4.0872°W

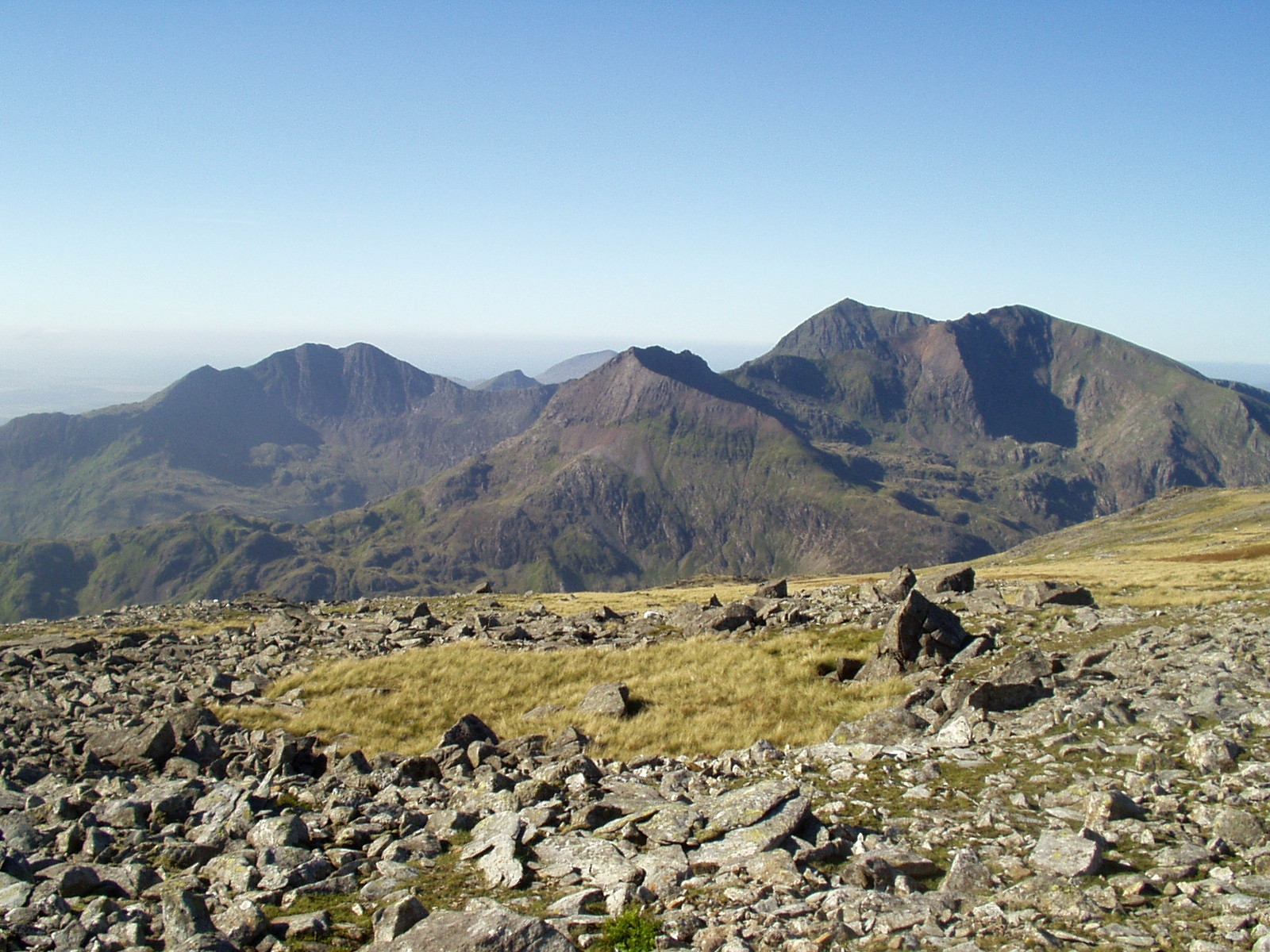
Snowdon massif as seen from Glyder Fawr – (Left to right:) Y Lliwedd, Crib Goch, Snowdon (Yr Wyddfa), Garnedd Ugain

The Snowdon Massif, Snowdon Range, or Yr Wyddfa massif, is one of the three mountain groups in Snowdonia (Eryri), north Wales, to include mountains over 3,000 feet (914 m) high. It occupies the area between Beddgelert, Pen-y-Pass and Llanberis. It is surrounded by the Glyderau to the north-east, Moel Siabod to the east, the Moelwynion to the south, Moel Hebog, the Nantlle Ridge and Mynydd Mawr to the west, and by flatter land leading down to Caernarfon and the Menai Strait to the north-west.

The Snowdon Horseshoe is the name given to the semi-circular ring of ridges and peaks on Snowdon's (Yr Wyddfa) eastern side, i.e. facing down Dyffryn Mymbyr towards Capel Curig. The peaks in the Horseshoe are those of Y Lliwedd, Snowdon, Garnedd Ugain and Crib Goch.

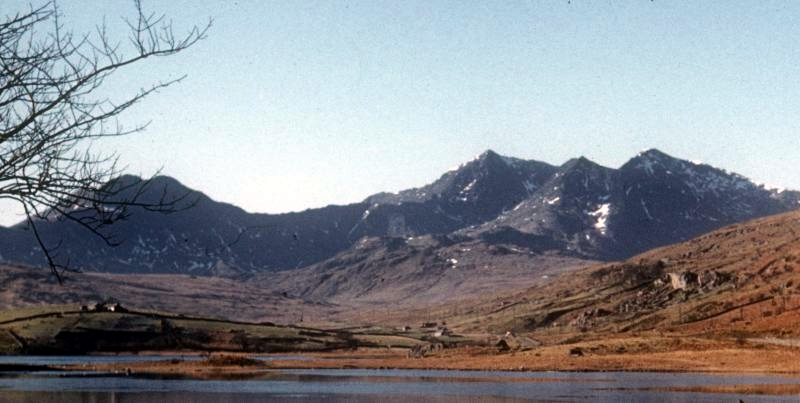
The Snowdon Horseshoe viewed from Dyffryn Mymbyr in early spring. Viewed left to right: Y Lliwedd, Snowdon (Yr Wyddfa), Crib Goch and Garnedd Ugain (Crib-y-Ddysgl)

== Peaks ==
All the peaks listed here are Hewitts; those marked with an asterisk are also Marilyns.

- Snowdon, also called Yr Wyddfa * – 1,085 m
- Garnedd Ugain, also called Crib y Ddysgl – 1,065 m
- Crib Goch – 923m
- Y Lliwedd * – 898 m
- Yr Aran * – 747 m
- Moel Eilio – 726 m
- Moel Cynghorion * – 674 m
- Foel Gron – 629 m

Sketch map of the Snowdon massif: Black lines: ridges; Dotted red lines: paths; Orange lines: roads; Grey line: Snowdon Mountain Railway
