= Pitt's Head =

Rock in Wales, United Kingdom

Coordinates: 53.0414°N 4.1251°W

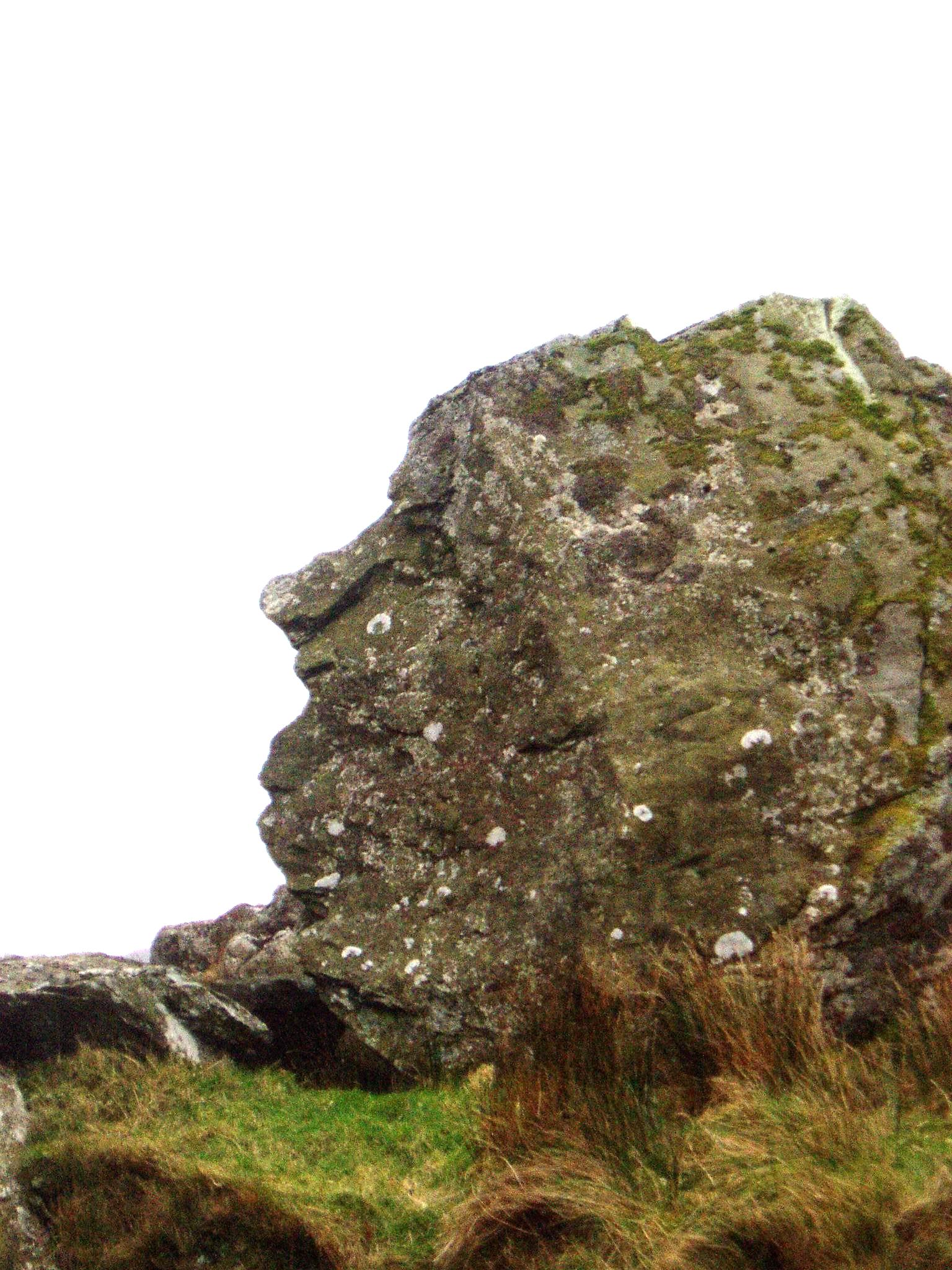
Pitt's Head

Pitt's Head (Welsh: Carreg Collwyn) is a distinctive rock located at grid reference SH576515, close to the A4085 road in Gwynedd, Wales. Its distinction lies in a resemblance to the profile of politician William Pitt the Younger.

== Geography ==
Located as it is near the base of one of the paths to the summit of Snowdon, Pitt's Head Halt was a station on the original Welsh Highland Railway, also marking the highest point on that railway. The present reconstruction of the railway does not envisage reopening the halt. The rock gives its name to the Pitt's Head Bridge, where the railway passes under the A4085, and the nearby Pitt's Head Cutting.

In the geology of the region, the rock gives its name to the rock of which it is formed, the Pitt's Head Tuff. This is an Ordovician acid ash-flow tuff which outcrops on the northern flanks of Snowdonia.

The correct name for this rock cluster is Cerrig Collwyn, Pitt's Head is only a name for one of these rocks. Collwyn ap Tango was said to be Lord of Eifionnydd, Ardudwy and part of Llŷn.

== Resemblance ==
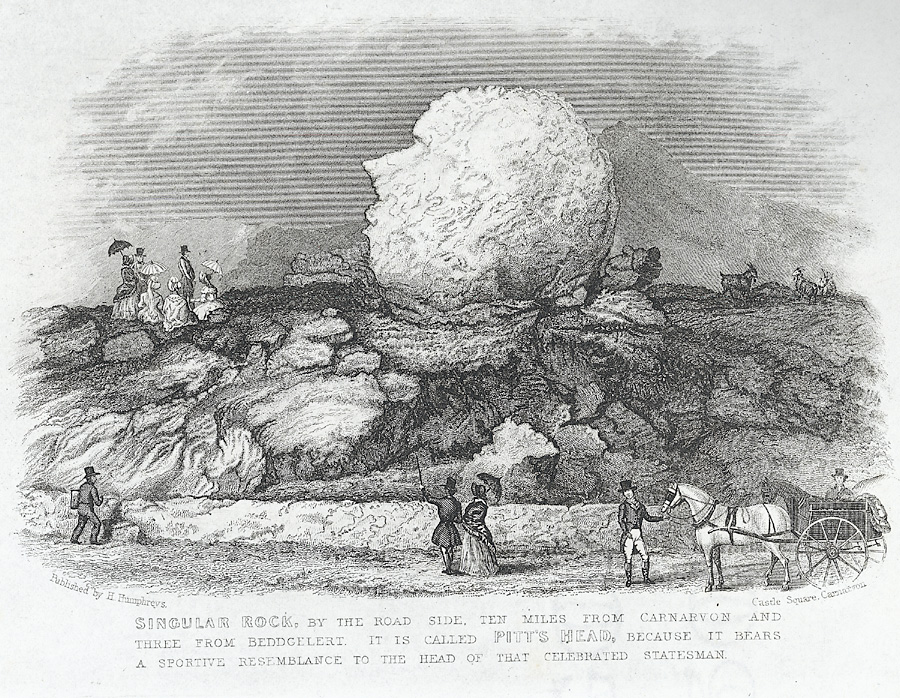
Artist's impression of Pitt's head, 1850

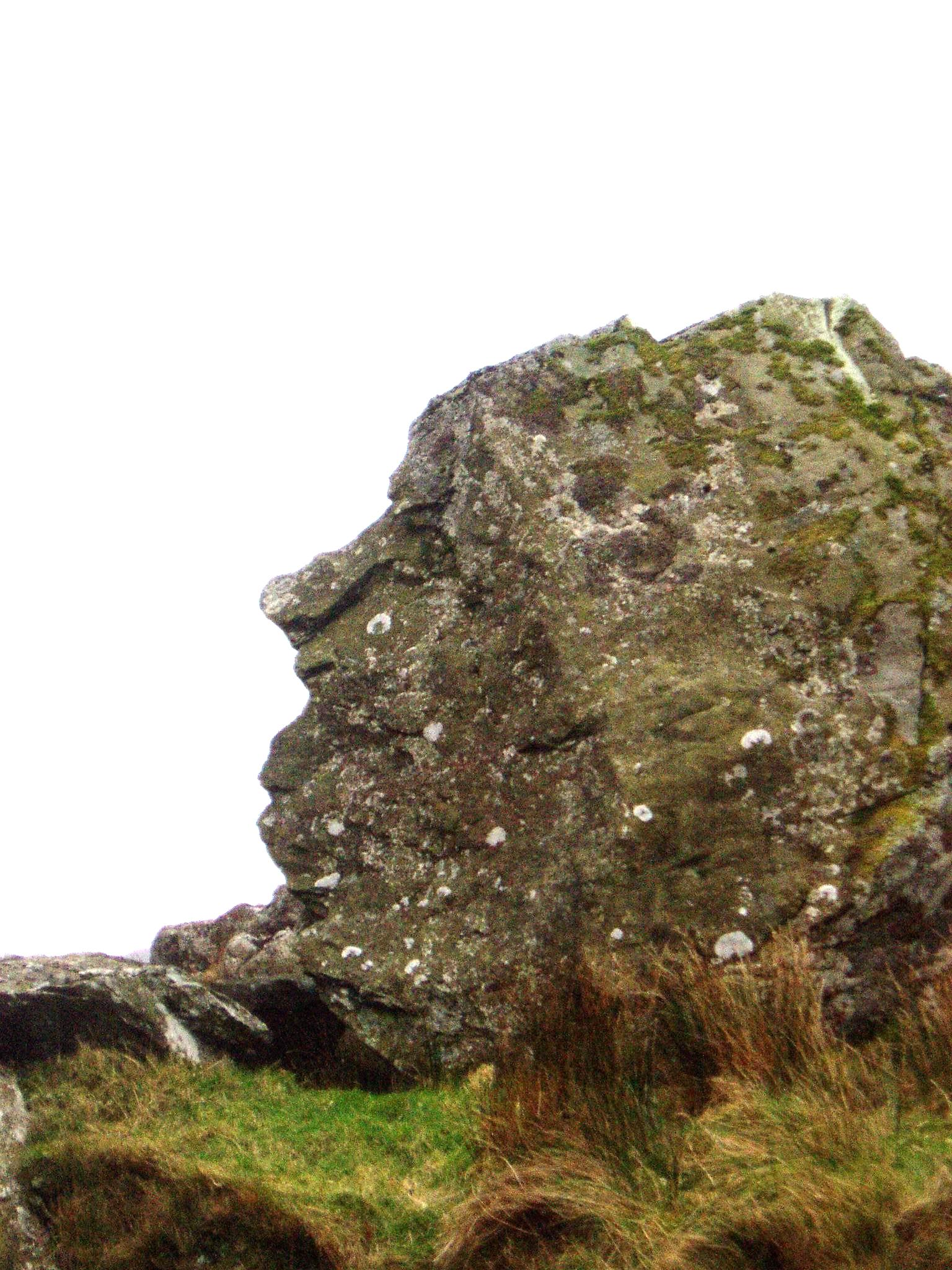
Pitt's Head

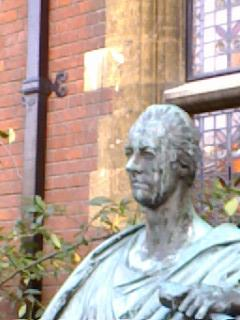
Statue of William Pitt at Pembroke College, Cambridge

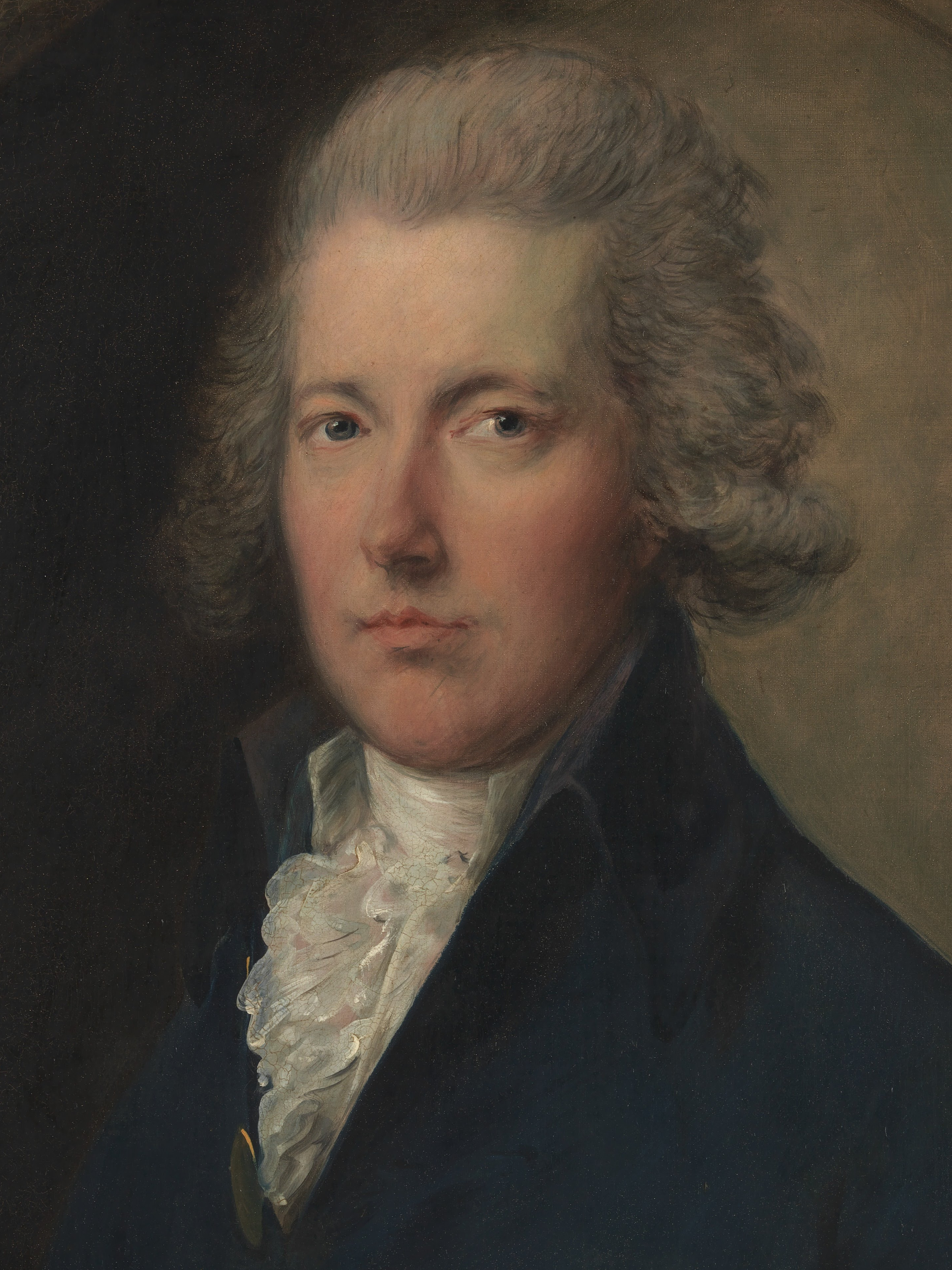
Portrait of William Pitt, attributed to Thomas Gainsborough

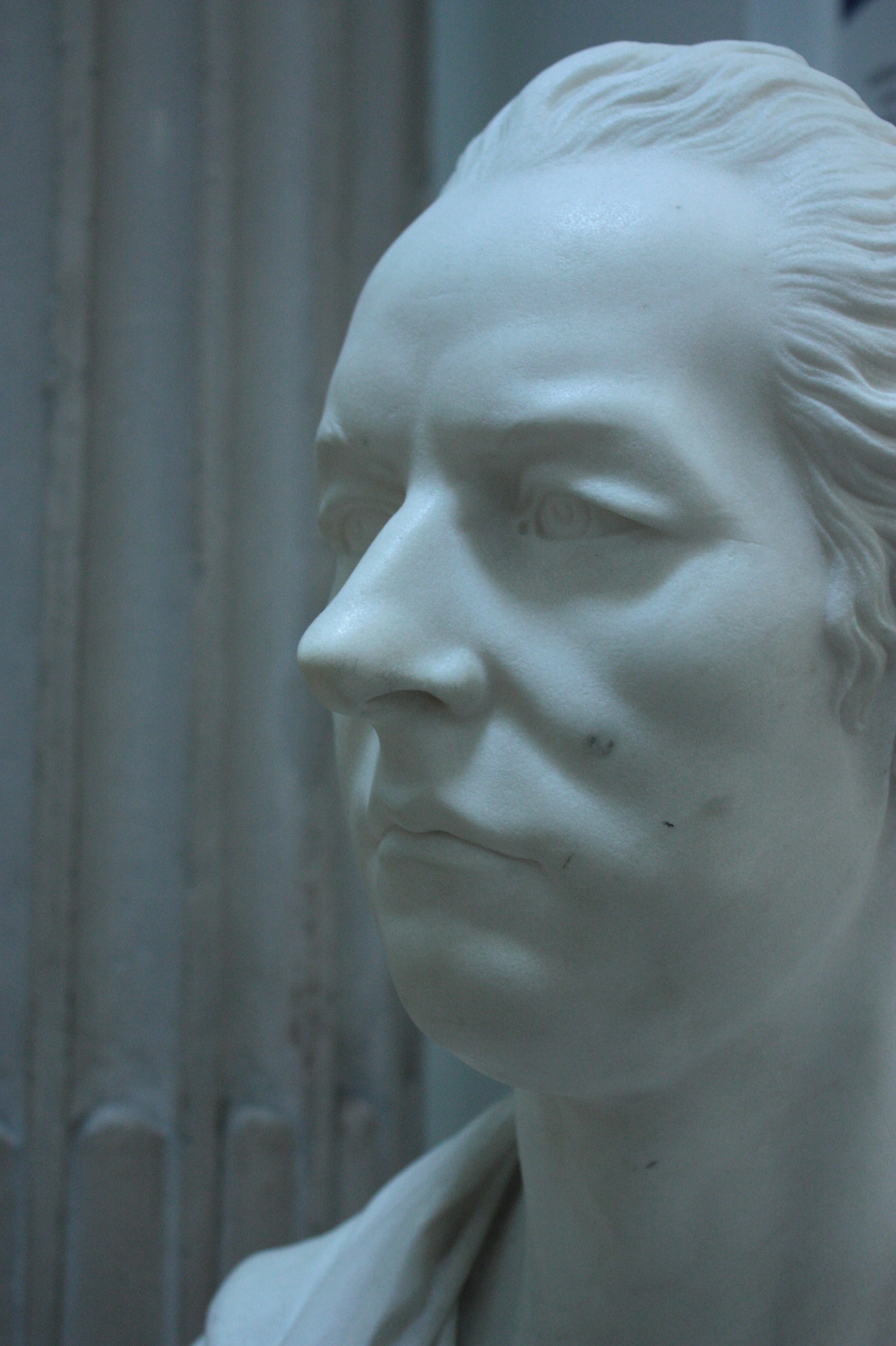
William Pitt by Joseph Nollekens, 1808

== Sources ==
- Cerrig Collwyn - See : Hynodion Gwlad y Bryniau - Cyfres Llafar Gwlad rhif 48 tudalen 7. By Steffan Ab Ioan
- The Lakes of Eryri Geraint Roberts Gwasg Carreg Gwalch 1995
- Leigh's guide to Wales & Monmouthshire, 1835, p. 71 Digitised
- Chisholm, Hugh, ed. (1911). "Colwyn Bay" . Encyclopædia Britannica. Vol. 6 (11th ed.). Cambridge University Press. p. 748. — However, this reference confuses irretrievably the town of Colwyn Bay on the North Wales Coast, and the River Colwyn which is close to Pitt's Head. There is no connection between the two apart from the name, but the Encyclopedia places Pitt's Head close to Colwyn Bay. It is nevertheless a source for the name of Pitt's Head.
- British Geological Survey, England and Wales Sheet 118
