= Glaslyn =

Lake in Snowdonia National Park, Wales

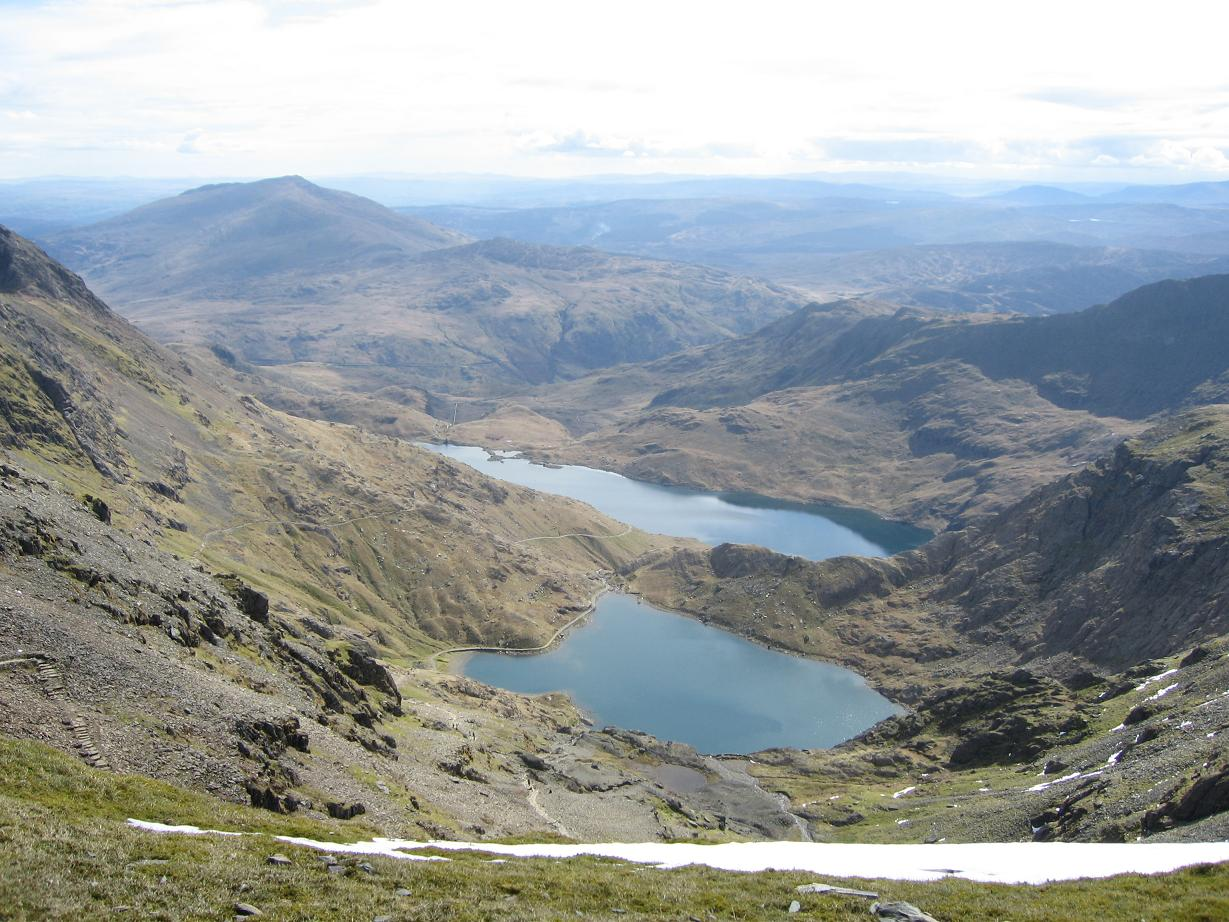
- Looking east from Snowdon: Glaslyn at bottom, Llyn Llydaw above

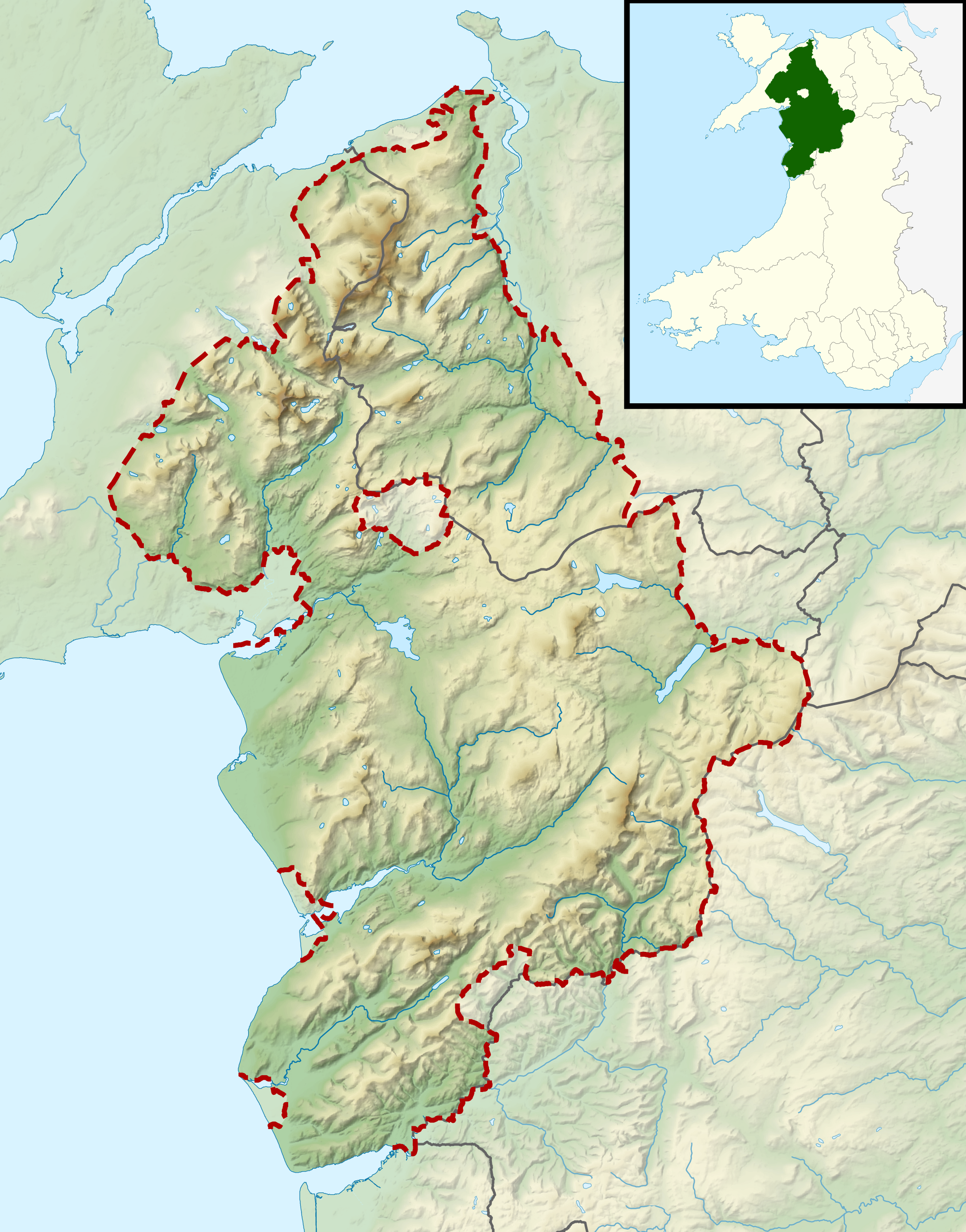
- Location within Snowdonia
- Location: Snowdon, Wales
- Coordinates: 53°4′14″N 4°3′58″W
- Basin countries: United Kingdom
- Max. length: 500 m (1,600 ft)
- Max. width: 300 m (980 ft)
- Surface area: 0.1 km^{2} (0.039 sq mi)
- Max. depth: 39 m (128 ft)
- Surface elevation: 600 m (2,000 ft)

Glaslyn (Welsh for 'Blue lake') is a lake in the Snowdonia National Park in Gwynedd, north-west Wales.

== Geography ==
It is found at approximately 600 metres (2,000 ft) above sea level in a cwm on the eastern flanks of Snowdon. It is a rough ellipse in shape, about 500 metres (1,600 ft) east–west and about 300 metres (1,000 ft) north–south, and the Miners' Track runs along the northern shore.

It has a maximum depth of 39 m (127 feet), and contains about 59 million cubic feet (1.7 million cubic metres) of water.

Glaslyn is the source of the Afon Glaslyn, the major river of Gwynedd, which runs east to the reservoir of Llyn Llydaw before turning south-west to reach the sea at Porthmadog.

In 2020, small particles of microplastic pollution – deposited by rain – were found in the lake, triggering a further investigation of the extent of environmental damage in UK lakes and mountains.

== Folklore ==
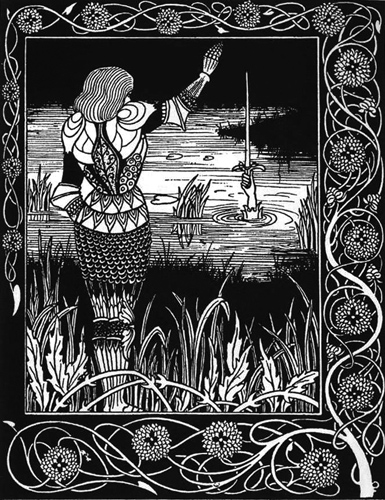
In Arthurian legend, Bedivere threw Excalibur into a lake identified by some as Glaslyn on the slopes of Snowdon.

In Welsh folklore, Arthur had Bedivere throw his sword Excalibur into Glaslyn, where Arthur's body was later placed in a boat to be carried away to Afallon. Arthur's men then retreated to a cave on the slopes of Y Lliwedd, where they are said to sleep until such time as they are needed. Merlin is supposed to have hidden the golden throne of Britain among the cliffs north of Crib y Ddysgl when the Saxons invaded.

Glaslyn was also the final resting place of a water monster, known as an afanc (also the Welsh word for beaver), which had plagued the people of the Conwy valley. They tempted the monster out of the water with a young girl, before securing it with chains and dragging it to Glaslyn. A large stone known as Maen Du'r Arddu, below Clogwyn Du'r Arddu, is supposed to have magical powers. Like several other sites in Wales, it is said that if two people spend the night there, one will become a great poet while the other will become insane. Llyn Coch in Cwm Clogwyn has been associated with the Tylwyth Teg (fairies), including a version of the fairy bride legend.

== See also ==
- RSPB Glaslyn Osprey Project
