= Cwm Dyli =

Hydroelectric power station in Wales

Cwm Dyli hydro-electric power station
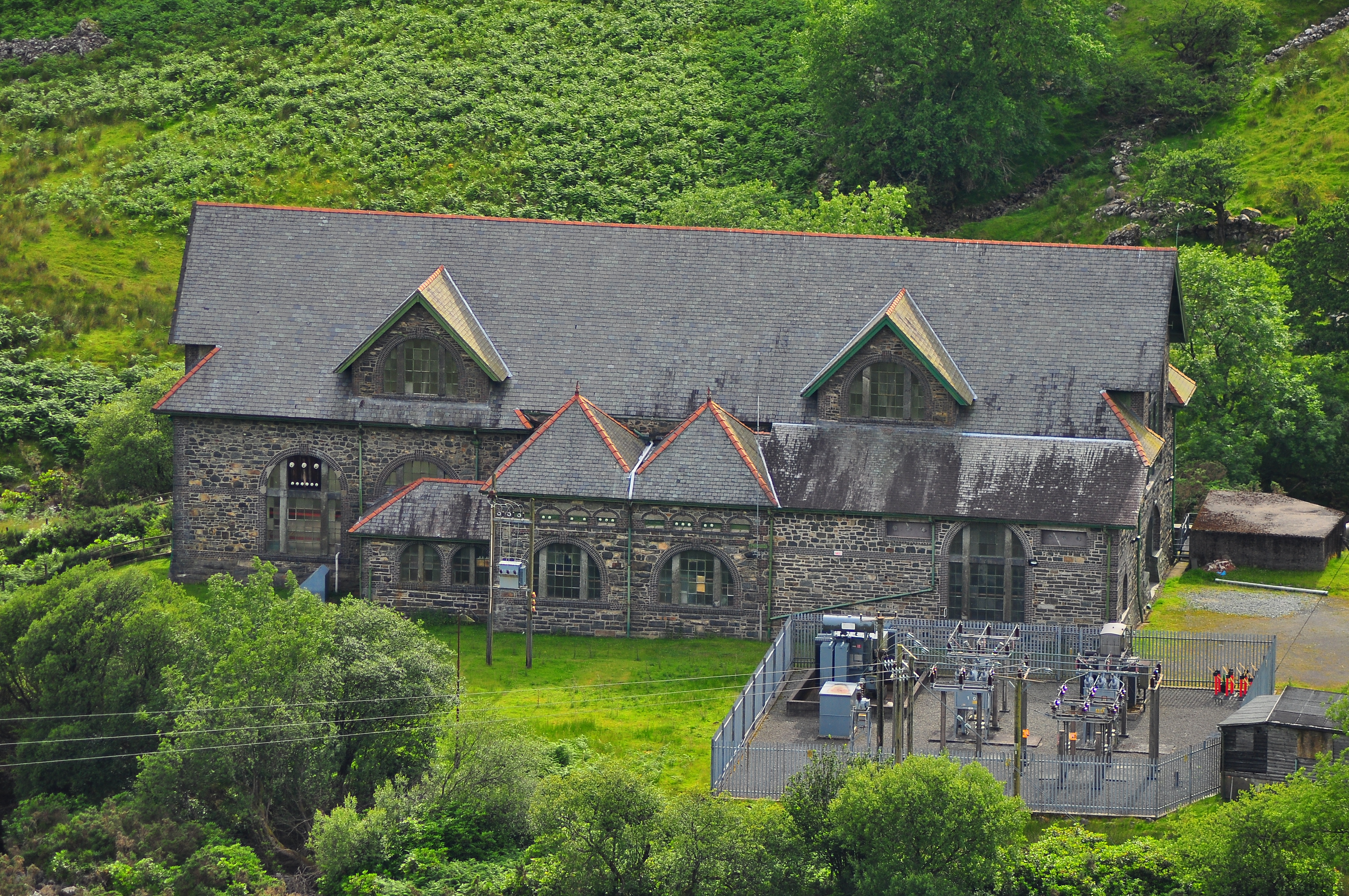

- Location within Wales
- Location: Cwm Dyli, Wales
- Coordinates: 53.0659°N 4.0115°W
- Opening date: 1905

Reservoir
- Creates: Llyn Llydaw

Power Station
- Installed capacity: 9.8 MW

Cwm Dyli is the location of a hydro-electric power station on the southern flank of the Snowdon range in North Wales. At the time it was built, it was the largest hydro-electric power station in the United Kingdom. It is Britain's oldest power station, and is believed to be one of the oldest Grid-connected hydro-electric stations in the world.

== History ==
The station was built in 1905 by the Porthmadog, Beddgelert and South Snowdon Railway company, backed by North Wales Power and Traction Co Ltd to supply electricity to its own electric railway and connected slate quarries and mines. The railway was planned to run through the same valley as the power station and be fed with an electrical feeder, but the enterprise ran short of funds and the attempt was abandoned. The company was renamed the North Wales Power Company Limited.

In August 1906, power from Cwm Dyli was used to power the Oakeley Quarry in Blaenau Ffestiniog carried over the Crimea Pass by a long overhead transmission line at 10,000 volts. It also supplied Dinorwic and Pen-yr-Orsedd quarries. Cwm Dyli was claimed to be the largest electricity generating plant of its kind in Great Britain at the time.

Electricity produced here was also used to power the Carnarvon Long Wave Wireless Telegraph transmitting station built by Marconi in 1913–14 near Waunfawr.

Supplying power directly to the National Grid, it is Britain's oldest power station, and is believed to be one of the oldest Grid-connected hydro-electric stations in the world. It was first commissioned in 1906 and has been in fairly continuous operation since then, although it was closed for upgrading in 1990. A single turbine now produces up to 9.8 megawatts (MW).

Known locally as the "Chapel in the valley", on account of its exterior design, it employed 13 men. Today, however, it is controlled remotely from Dolgarrog in the Conwy valley.

Water for the site primarily comes from Llyn Llydaw, some 320 metres above the power station, where rainfall is very high. The water is carried from the lake through a tunnel and two 30-inch (0.762 m) diameter, 2-kilometre (1.2 mi) long pipelines.

The pipeline featured briefly in the James Bond film The World Is Not Enough.

== Technical details ==
The generating equipment at Cwm Dyli up to 1989 comprised:

- 2 × Ganz Pelton wheels
- 2 × Boving Pelton wheels, together these aggregated a capacity of 900 horse power (6.619 MW)

The four wheels drove:

- 1 × 1 MW Bruce Peebles alternator
- 1 × 1.5 MW Bruce Peebles alternator
- 1 × 3 MW Bruce Peebles alternator

The total electricity generating capacity was 6.5 MW, at 10 kV.

Annual electricity output in MWh from Cwm Dyli between 1921 and 1986

== See also ==
- Npower (UK)
- Timeline of the UK electricity supply industry
- List of power stations in Wales
- Hydroelectricity in the United Kingdom
- Dolgarrog power station
