= Llyn Llydaw =

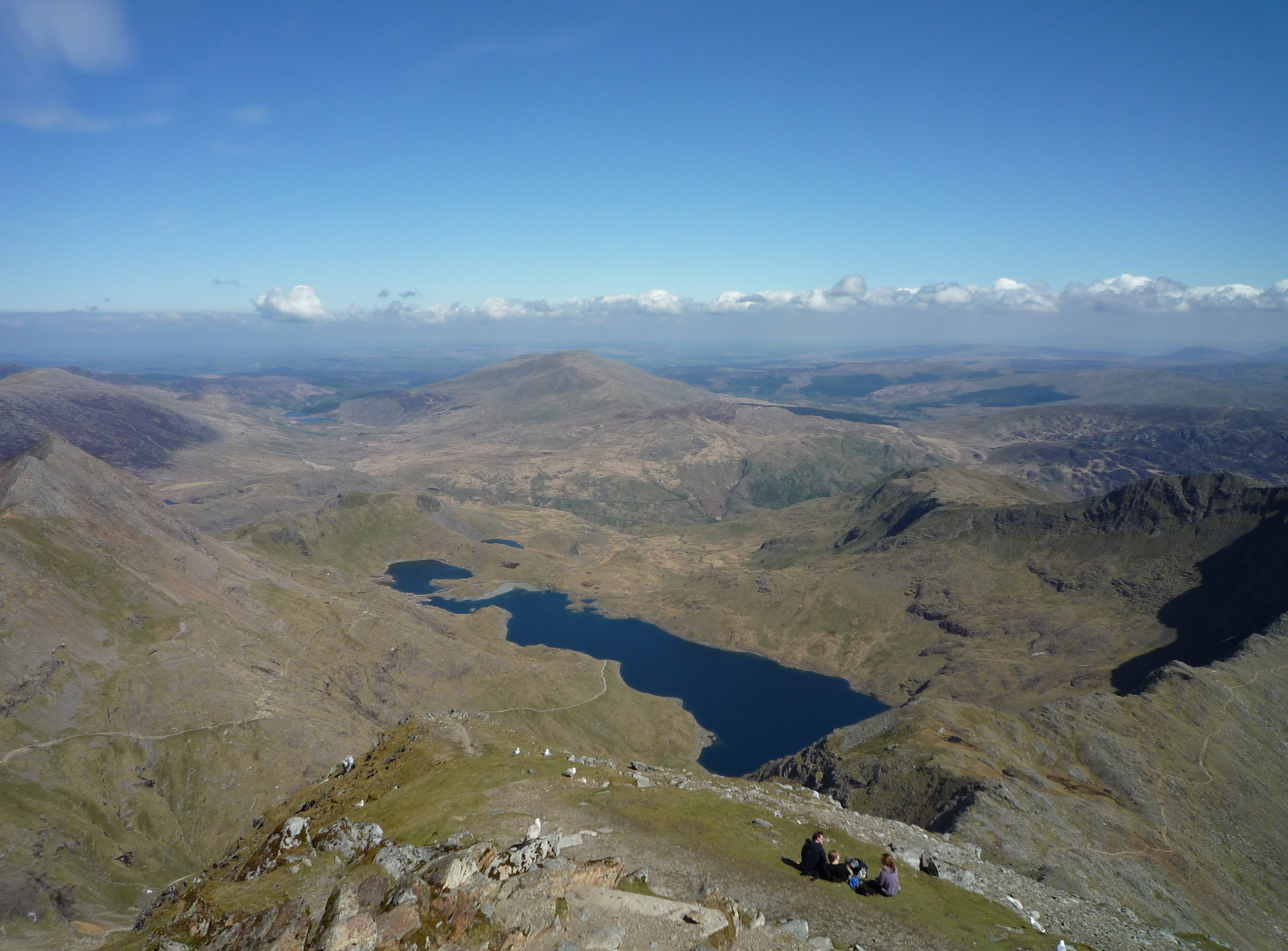
- Llyn Llydaw seen from the summit of Snowdon

- Location within Gwynedd
- Location: Snowdonia National Park, Wales
- Coordinates: 53°4′7″N 4°2′50″W
- Lake type: natural, reservoir
- Basin countries: United Kingdom
- Surface area: 110 acres (45 ha)
- Surface elevation: 436 m (1,430 ft)

Llyn Llydaw (Welsh for 'Brittany lake') is a natural lake in Snowdonia National Park on the flanks of Snowdon, Wales' highest mountain. This long thin lake has formed in a cwm about one-third of the way up the mountain. It is one of the most visited lakes in the United Kingdom, in that many thousands of people every year visit Snowdon and many walk past this lake on the Miners' Track.

== History ==
Llyn Llydaw is the largest of the three lakes on Snowdon's eastern flank. Higher up lies Glaslyn, and lower down lies Llyn Teyrn.

In 1905, a two-kilometre (1 1/4-mile) pipeline was built from the lake into the valley below. Water from the lake powers the Cwm Dyli hydroelectric power station 320 metres (1,050 ft) below. The pipeline and power station continue to operate.

== Popular culture ==
The lake featured in Robson Green's Wild Swimming Adventure (ITV December 2009), chosen because it is claimed to be the coldest lake in Britain. Green's website states that the water was 7 °C.
