= Afanc =

Welsh mythological monster

The Afanc (Welsh pronunciation: [ˈavaŋk], sometimes also called Addanc, [ˈaðaŋk]) is a lake monster from Welsh mythology. Its exact description varies, being described as resembling a crocodile, beaver or dwarf-like creature, or a platypus and is sometimes said to be a demon. The lake in which it dwells is also uncertain and it is variously said to live in Llyn Llion, Llyn Barfog, near Brynberian Bridge or in Llyn yr Afanc, a pool on the Afon Conwy near Betws-y-coed that was named after the creature.

== Legends and traditions ==
The afanc was a monstrous creature that, like most lake monsters, was said to prey upon any foolish enough to fall into or swim in its lake.

One of the earliest descriptions of it is given by the 15th-century poet Lewys Glyn Cothi, who described it as living in Llyn Syfaddon, in Powys.

One tale relates that it was rendered helpless by a maiden who let it sleep upon her lap; while it slept, the maiden's fellow cows bound the creature in chains. The creature was awakened and made furious; its enraged thrashings crushed the maiden, in whose lap it still lay. It was finally dragged away to the lake Cwm Ffynnon, or killed by Peredur (Percival, Peredur's name in Chrétien de Troyes' telling of the Arthurian cycle).

In the tale, Peredur son of Efrawg, translated by Lady Charlotte Guest in the Mabinogion taken from the White Book of Rhydderch and Red Book of Hergest, the "Addanc of the Lake" resides in a cave near the "Palace of the Sons of the King of the Tortures". The palace is so named because the Addanc slays the three sons (chieftains) of the king each day, only for them to be resurrected by the maidens of the court. It is not stated why this cycle of violence continues, but when Peredur asks to ride with the three chieftains, who seek out the Addanc daily, they state that they will not accept his company as if he was slain they would not be able to bring him back to life.

Peredur continues to the cave on his own, wishing to kill the creature to increase his fame and honour. On his journey he meets a maiden who states that the Addanc will slay Peredur through cunning, as the beast is invisible and kills his victims with poison darts. The maiden, actually the Queen of Constantinople, gives Peredur an adder stone that will make the creature visible.

Peredur ventures into the cave and with the aid of the stone, pierces the Addanc before beheading it. When the three chieftains arrive at the cave they state that it was predicted that Peredur would kill the Addanc.

== Iolo Morganwg ==
According to a version of an afanc legend as put forth by the famous writer of myths and folklore Edward Williams known as Iolo Morganwg, its thrashings caused massive flooding which ultimately drowned all inhabitants of Britain save for two people, Dwyfan and Dwyfach, from whom the later inhabitants of Prydain descended.

According to one version of the myth, also put forth by Iolo Morganwg, Hu Gadarn's oxen dragged the afanc out of the lake; once it was out of the water, it was powerless and could be killed. This version locates the creature in Llyn Llion.

== Orthography ==
The correct rendering of this name in Modern Welsh depends on the specific source. The Middle Welsh avanc of Llyn Barfog is afanc in Modern Welsh, a word which is now used to mean "beaver". The form avanc/afanc is also used in the Red Book of Hergest and most other medieval sources. In the Middle Welsh version of Peredur's tale in the White Book of Rhydderch, the creature in the cave is called the addanc. Afanc is by far the most common spelling.

== In popular culture ==
An afanc appears in Silver on the Tree, the final book in Susan Cooper's The Dark is Rising sequence.

In the Merlin episode "The Mark of Nimueh", the villainess Nimueh creates an afanc by molding a small figure out of clay and hatching it from an egg-like container. The creature spreads a deadly disease across Camelot through the water it inhabits, until Merlin and Arthur manage to destroy it.

In China Miéville's 2002 book The Scar, the floating city-state of Amarda summons an avanc, attaching it to the city and using its huge pulling-power to cross the ocean.

In the October Daye series by Seanan McGuire, afanc are a marsh creature about the size of a cow with fur, scales, and a "disturbing" number of teeth.

The Super Sentai TV series Juken Sentai Gekiranger features the Genjuken Warrior known as Genju Afanc-Fist Sojo who is modeled after the rodent depiction of the Afanc and is also based on the rat of the Chinese zodiac. In Power Rangers Jungle Fury, he is adopted into Badrat of the Phantom Beasts.

In The Lord of the Rings Online video game, the culture of Dunland, sparsely described by J. R. R. Tolkien, is heavily based on the Welsh mythology. The "Avanc" appear as wildlife monsters in Dunland with an appearance resembling that of a crocodile with fur and scales.

In the 2024 YA novel The Wild Huntress by Emily Lloyd-Jones (based on Welsh mythology), the title character Branwen wields a dagger made from an afanc fang, Prince Pryderi was raised and exploited by an afanc as a young boy, and the Otherking’s champion huntress Cigfa wears a cloak of afanc scales.

David Williams, in his book Welsh Folklore: A Guide to the Mythical and the Mysterious, highlights that the Afanc was a symbol of both danger and courage in Welsh myth.
