= Snowden =

Snowden may refer to:

== People ==
- Snowden (surname), a given name and a family name
  - Edward Snowden, former computer intelligence consultant who leaked highly classified information from the National Security Agency (NSA) in 2013

== Fictional characters ==
- Snowden (character), a character from the novel Catch-22 by Joseph Heller
- Snowden, a Christmas character in Snowden on Ice

== Places ==
- Snowden, West Virginia, US
- Snowden Mountain, a summit in Alaska, US
- Snowden Crags and Snowden Carr, a prehistoric archaeological site in North Yorkshire, England, UK
- Snowden International School, a public high school in Boston, Massachusetts, US

== Music ==
- Snowden (band), an indie rock band from Atlanta, Georgia, US
- Snowden (EP)
- "Snowden" (song), a 2005 song by Doves from Some Cities
- Snowden Family Band, a 19th-century singing group from Knox County, Ohio, US

== Other uses ==
- Snowden (film), a 2016 biographical political thriller by Oliver Stone
- Snowden (physics), a unit of X-ray emissivity

== See also ==
- Cherax snowden (C. snowden), a crayfish from West Papua, Indonesia
- Snowdon, the highest mountain in Wales
- Snowdon (disambiguation)
- "Snowdin", a song on the Undertale Soundtrack
