= Biodiversity of Wales =

Variety of life in Wales

The three national parks of Wales

The biodiversity of Wales is the wide variety of ecosystems, living organisms, and the genetic makeups found in Wales.

Wales is a predominantly mountainous peninsula located between England and the Irish Sea, covering 8,023 square miles. It has terrestrial habitats and many protected areas rich in biodiversity, including three national parks and five Areas of Outstanding Natural Beauty (AONB). The national parks being: Snowdonia, Pembrokeshire Coast, and Brecon Beacons, and the AONBs of: Anglesey, the Clwydian Range and Dee Valley, Gower Peninsula, Llŷn Peninsula, and Wye Valley (partially in England). Wales also has many locations categorised as Site of Special Scientific Interest, Special Area of Conservation, Special Protection Area and local nature reserve. There are many zoos and gardens, including the National Botanic Garden of Wales.

On the coast, a great diversity of species such as seals, dolphins, sharks, jellyfish, crabs and lobsters can be found. There are also seabird colonies on the islands near the coast. Species which can only be found in Wales are the Radnor lily and a type of fish, the gwyniad, only found in Llyn Tegid (Bala Lake). The rare fen orchid (Liparis loeselii) is one of the most threatened species in northwestern Europe and has vanished from many places in Wales. The Welsh Government funds Natural Resources Wales (NRW), Plantlife, Bridgend County Borough Council and the Wales Biodiversity Partnership coastal ecosystem group to help reconstruct its natural habitat and secure the future of this threatened species.

The Welsh Government works closely with the Wales Biodiversity Partnership (WBP) which promotes and monitors the Wales biodiversity action plan. In 2010 the Welsh government launched a Natural Environment Framework, "A Living Wales", which focuses on sustainable land and marine management in Wales. The Environment (Wales) Act 2016 put into place a range of powers and duties designed to enable the natural resources of Wales to be planned and management in a more sustainable, pro-active and joined-up way than was previously possible.

== Elements ==
=== Floral biodiversity ===
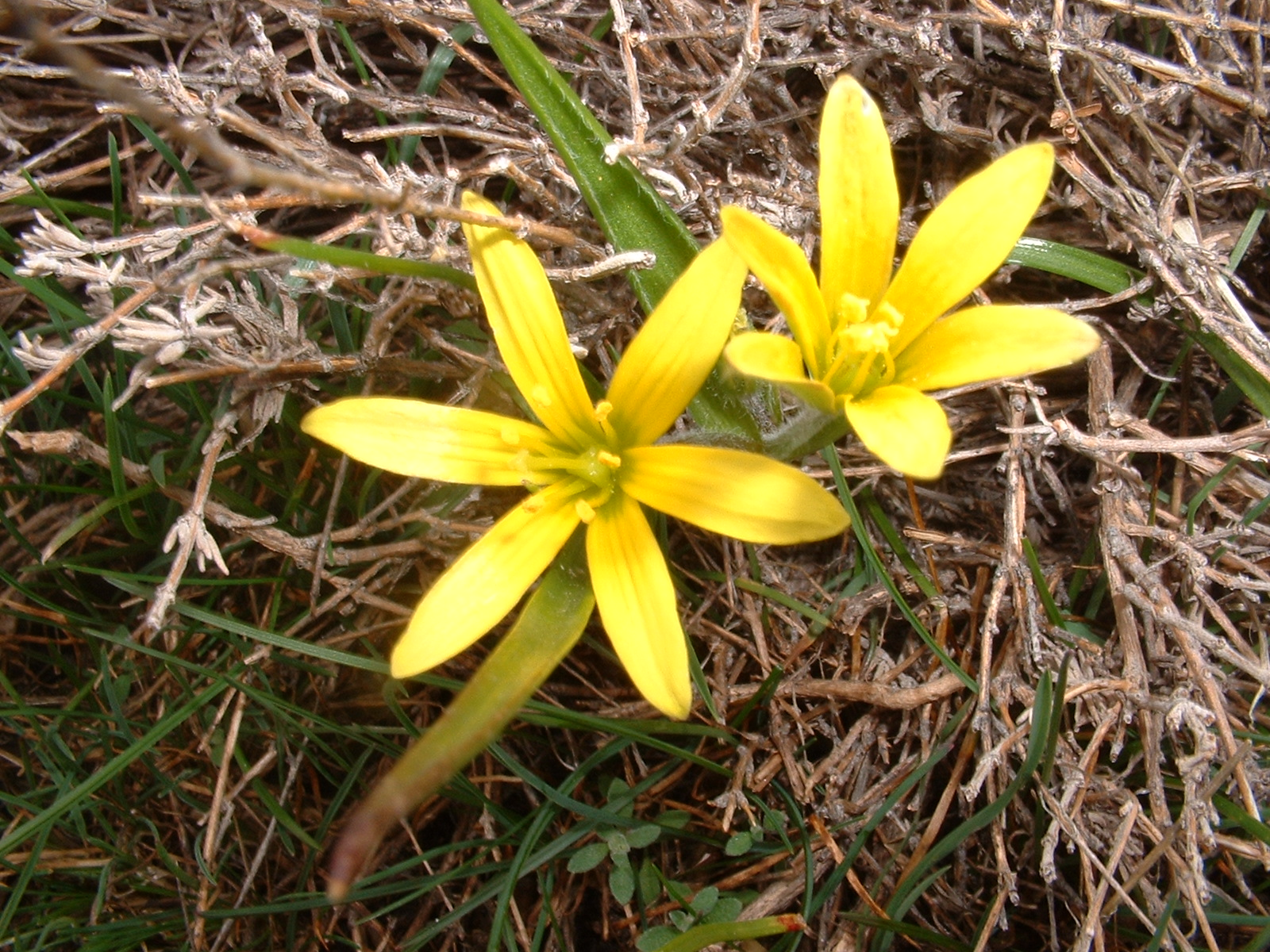
Gagea bohemica

==== Trees ====
The sessile oak (Quercus petraea), one of Wales's most common species, can be found across the region. English holly (Ilex aquifolium), one of the few native evergreen trees, can be found in southern Wales. The wych elm (Ulmus glabra), a native species, suffers from disease and competition introduced by exotic species.

==== Flowers ====
The cuckoo flower (Cardamine pratensis), a herbaceous perennial, can be found throughout Wales. Bog rosemary (Andromeda polifolia), a small flowering shrub, can be found in central Wales. Within the British Isles, the Snowdon lily (Gagea serotina) is found only on the slopes of Snowdon.

==== Important Plant Areas ====
Important Plant Areas (IPAs) in Wales are areas of "the highest botanical importance" as determined by Plantlife.

Historic county (Welsh name)	Species	Habitat
Anglesey (Sir Fôn)	Spotted rock-rose (Tuberaria guttata)	Dry, rocky places
Brecknockshire (Sir Frycheiniog)	Cuckooflower (Cardamine pratensis)	Wet grassland and pond margins
Caernarvonshire (Sir Gaernarfon)	Snowdon lily (Gagea serotina)	Mountain rocks
Cardiff (Caerdydd); Not an historic county	Wild leek (Allium ampeloprasum)	Sandy and rocky places near the sea
Cardiganshire (Sir Aberteifi or Ceredigion)	Bog-rosemary (Andromeda polifolia)	Mid-Wales
Carmarthenshire (Sir Gaerfyrddin)	Whorled caraway (Carum verticillatum)	Damp meadows
Denbighshire (Sir Ddinbych)	Limestone woundwort (Stachys alpina)	Roadsides and hedges
Flintshire (Sir Fflint)	Bell heather (Erica cinerea)	Heaths and moors
Glamorgan (Morgannwg)	Yellow whitlow-grass (Draba aizoides)	Rocks and old walls
Merionethshire (Sir Feirionnydd)	Welsh poppy (Meconopsis cambrica)	Damp, shady rocks
Monmouthshire (Sir Fynwy)	Foxglove (Digitalis purpurea)	Woodland clearings, heaths and banks
Montgomeryshire (Sir Drefaldwyn)	Spiked speedwell (Veronica spicata)	Limestone rocks
Pembrokeshire (Sir Benfro)	Thrift (Armeria maritima)	Coastal cliffs or astride craggy islands
Radnorshire (Sir Faesyfed)	Radnor lily (Gagea bohemica)	Limestone rocks

=== Faunal diversity ===
==== Marine ====
Around Cardigan Bay and Pembrokeshire coast, minke and pilot whales are common in the summer while fin and killer whales are rare. Bottlenose dolphins are common and Risso’s dolphin and Atlantic white-sided dolphin are rare. Whales, grey seals, basking sharks and sunfish can also be seen.

==== Mammals ====
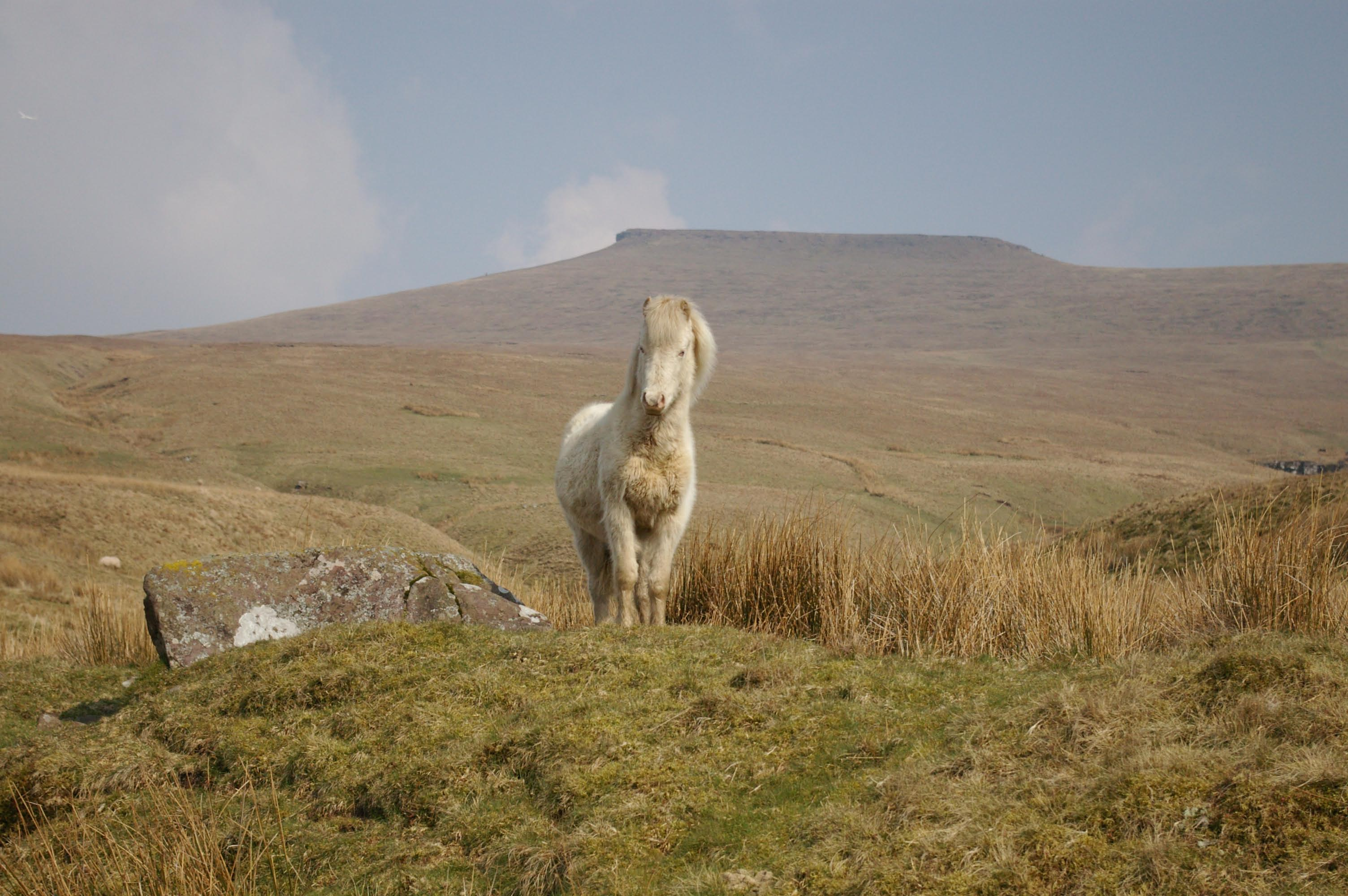
Welsh Mountain Pony

Roe deer (Capreolus capreolus) and fallow deer (Dama dama) are the two largest mammal species in Wales. Roe deer are found in central and northern Wales. Fallow deer are found in rural and semiurban areas of Wales. The European polecat (Mustela putorius) can be found in both urban and country environments. Found in the same area is the red fox, one of the most common mammals in Wales.

The red deer, one of five native deer species, is the biggest non-marine mammal in Wales. (Although native populations of deer have long been extinct). Fallow, muntjac roe and sika deer can also be found. pine martens are very rarely seen. Other mammals include badgers, foxes, hares, hedgehogs, otters, rabbits, stoats, weasels, red squirrels, and 13 species of bat.

==== Birds ====
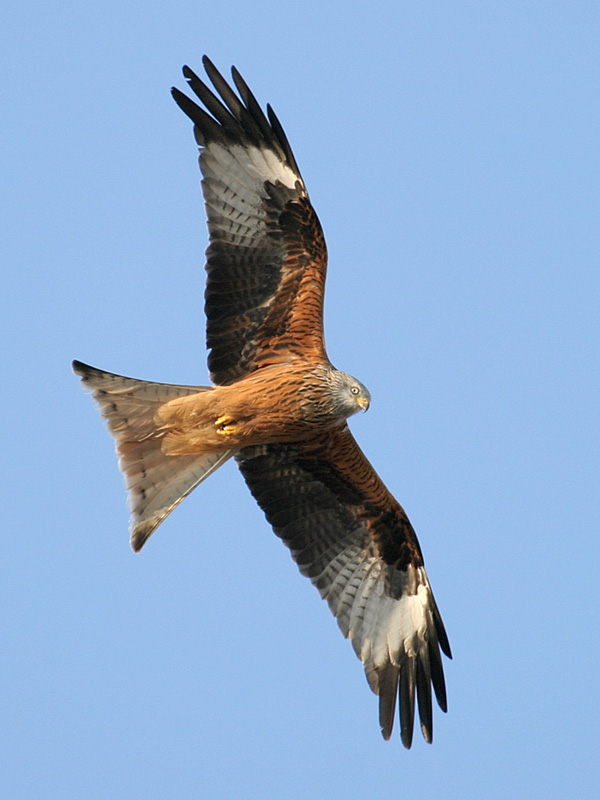
Red kite (Milvus milvus)

About 430 species of birds have been found in Wales. Red kites and ospreys are some "signature species" of Wales. Dippers, choughs, puffins, guillemots, razorbills, short-eared owls, Manx shearwaters, whimbrel and plovers are also common. Montagu's harrier (Circus pygargus), a rare species in Britain, has several nesting places in Wales. Red grouse (Lagopus lagopus scotica), once a common species, has reduced population dramatically due to human hunting. Red grouse can be found at the extreme north part of Wales.

==== Reptiles ====
Adders, common lizards, notably around Oxwich Bay and grass snakes have been recorded. Some sand lizards bred by Herpetological Conservation Trust volunteers and Chester and Jersey Zoos have been released into the wild.

==== Priority Species ====
Species	Species
Lesser horseshoe bat (Rhinolophus hipposideros)	Greater horseshoe bat (Rhinolophus ferrumequinum)
Common pipistrelle (Pipistrellus pipistrellus)	Common dolphin (Delphinus delphis)
Natterjack toad (Bufo calamita)	Grass snake (Natrix natrix)
Common lizard (Lacerta vivipara)	Pine marten (Martes martes)
Chough (Pyrrhocorax pyrrhocorax)	Common toad (Bufo bufo)
Harbour porpoise (Phocoena phocoena)	Bottlenose dolphin (Tursiops truncatus)
Minke whale (Balaenoptera acutorostrata)	Otter (Lutra lutra)
Marsh fritillary (Euphydryas aurinia)	Twait shad (Alosa fallax)
Great crested newt (Triturus cristatus)	Adder (Vipera berus)
Eurasian skylark (Alauda arvensis)	Polecat (Mustela putorius)
Water vole (Arvicola amphibius)	Risso's dolphin (Grampus griseus)

== Endemism ==
=== Trees ===
Native species include ash, birch, oak, willow, holly, juniper, Scots pine and yew. Planting and conservation of natives species is encouraged, because they tend to better survive the local environment. They also help balance the biodiversity and provide wood and timbers.

=== Flowering plants ===
Ash, service tree, wild leeks, Tenby daffodil.

==== Bryophytes ====
Wales has over 300 species of mosses and liverworts.

The endangered species are: Bartramia stricta, Cryphaea lamyana, Ditrichum plumbicola, Hamatocaulis vernicosus, Pallavicinia lyellii, Petalophyllum ralfsii, Riccia huebeneriana and Sematophyllum demissum.

=== Mammals ===
- Lesser horseshoe bat (Rhinolophus hipposideros)
- Red squirrels

=== Birds ===
- Hen harrier
- Black grouse
- Curlew
- Golden plover

=== Reptiles ===
There are five native reptiles in Wales. These include grass snakes, sand lizards, common lizards and slowworms.

=== Amphibians ===
There are six native amphibians in Wales. They are the common toad, great crested newt, natterjack toad, palmate newt, smooth newt and common frog.

=== Invertebrates ===
An estimated 25,000 invertebrate species live in land and freshwater habitats in Wales.

== Human impact ==
Welsh biodiversity has been reduced by human activity. Many native species were lost because of lack of woodland support. Believed to be home to some of Wales's rarest land invertebrates, some 2,500 disused coal tips are the subject of study by the Welsh Government; the tips are home to a wide variety of other wildlife.

=== Animals ===
Many conservation projects have been set up to preserve the red squirrel. There is a great decline in the number of hedgehogs. The use of pesticides has caused a major decline in honeybees; a Pollinator Action plan was launched at the Royal Welsh Show in July 2012.

== Management ==
Wales has 175 species on the Section 74 list of Species of Principal Importance for the Conservation of Biological Diversity. However, the list of species and habitats of principal importance in Wales is now based on new legislation in the form of sections 6 and 7 of the Environment (Wales) 2016 Act. In Wales, the United Kingdom Biodiversity Action Plan (UKBAP) was implemented by the Wales Biodiversity Partnership (WBP). The Countryside Council for Wales also assists in sustainability management.

Wales Biodiversity Partnership (WBP) organises the overall plan, and on a local scale, each council carries out its own surveys and reports back, then produces management and protection plants for the identified species and habitats.

The Welsh government cooperates with European Community directives on the conservation of wild birds and natural habitats and wild flora and fauna as well as with NATURA 2000.

== Gallery ==
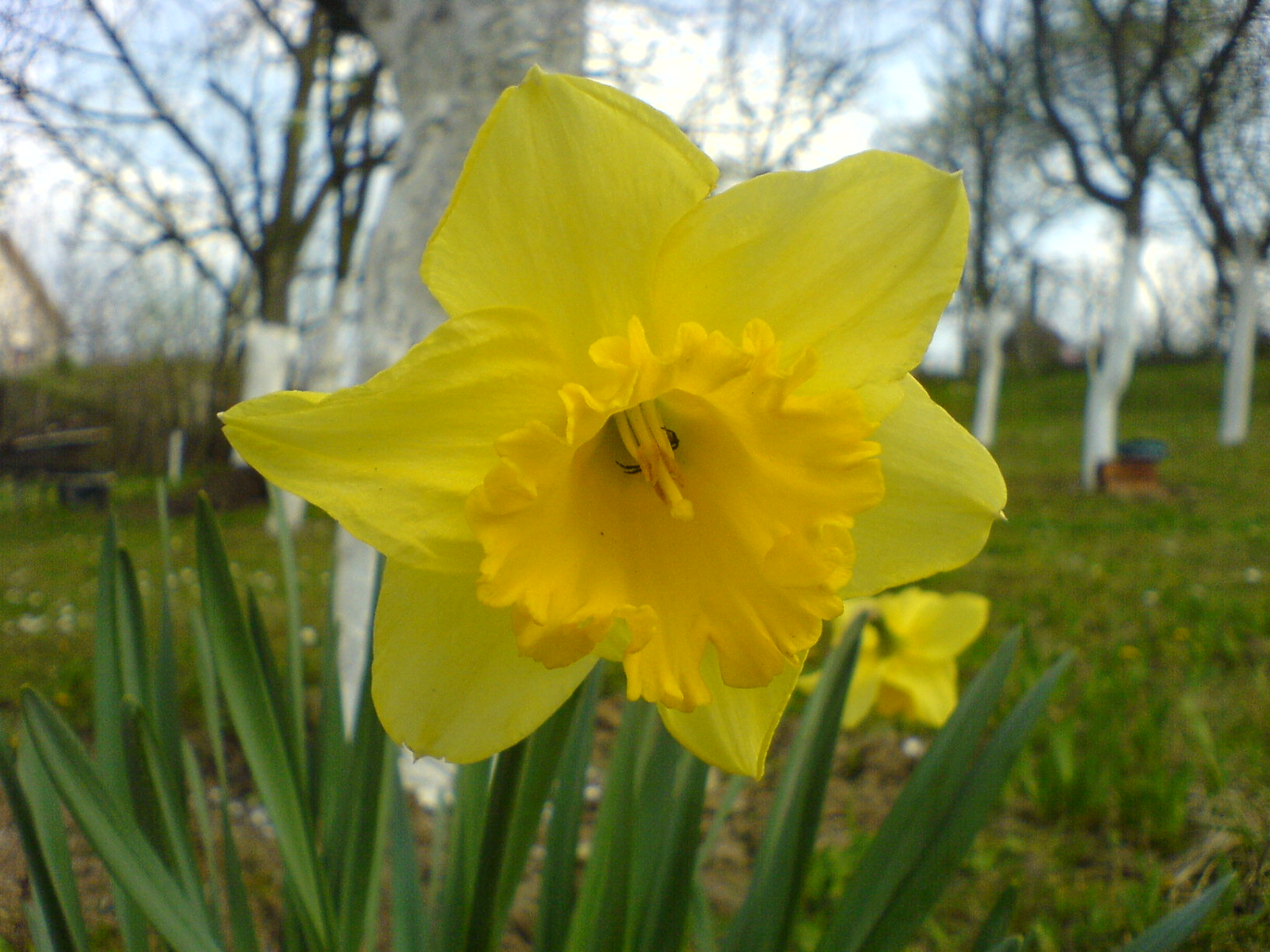
Daffodil

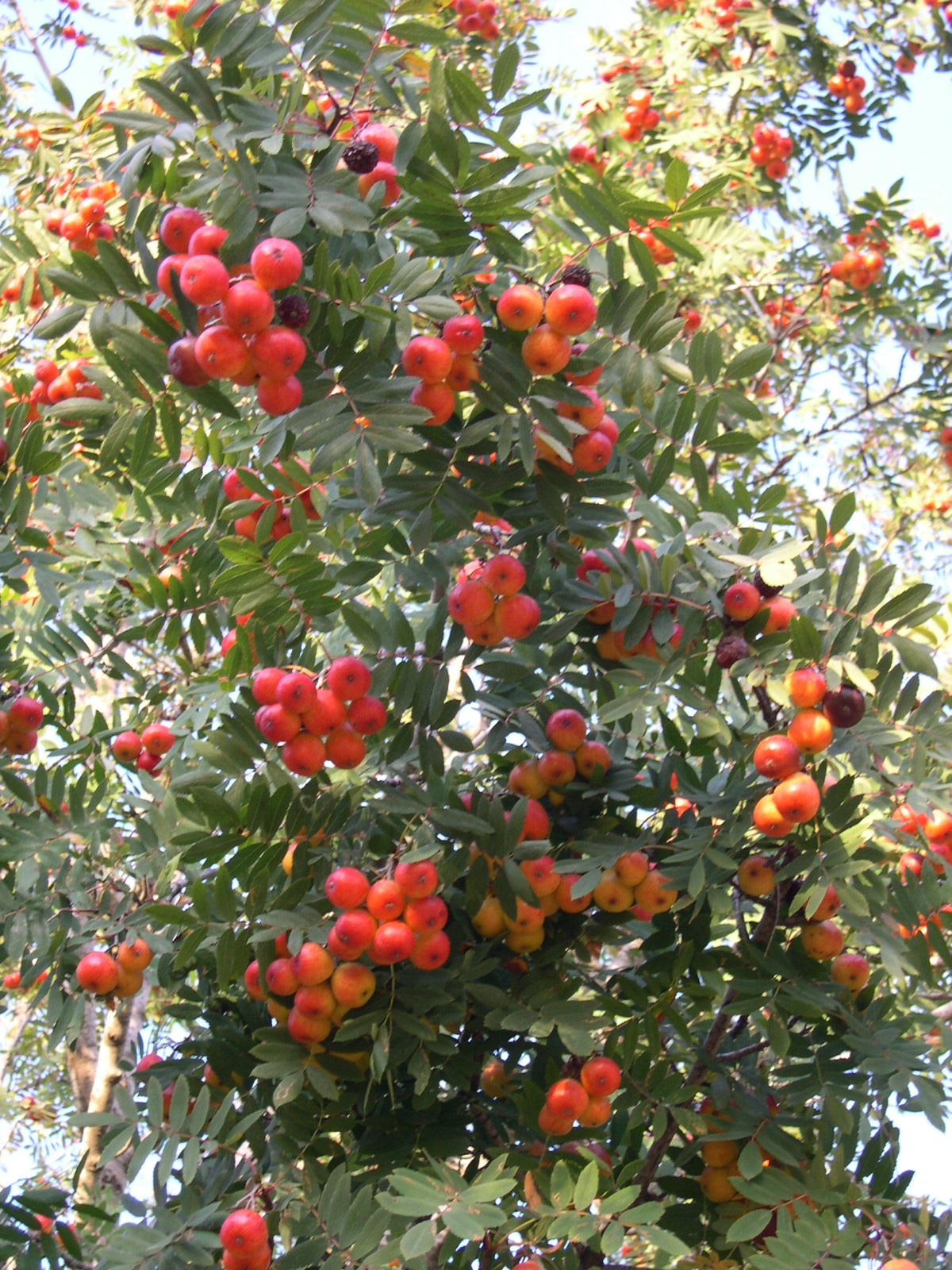
True service tree

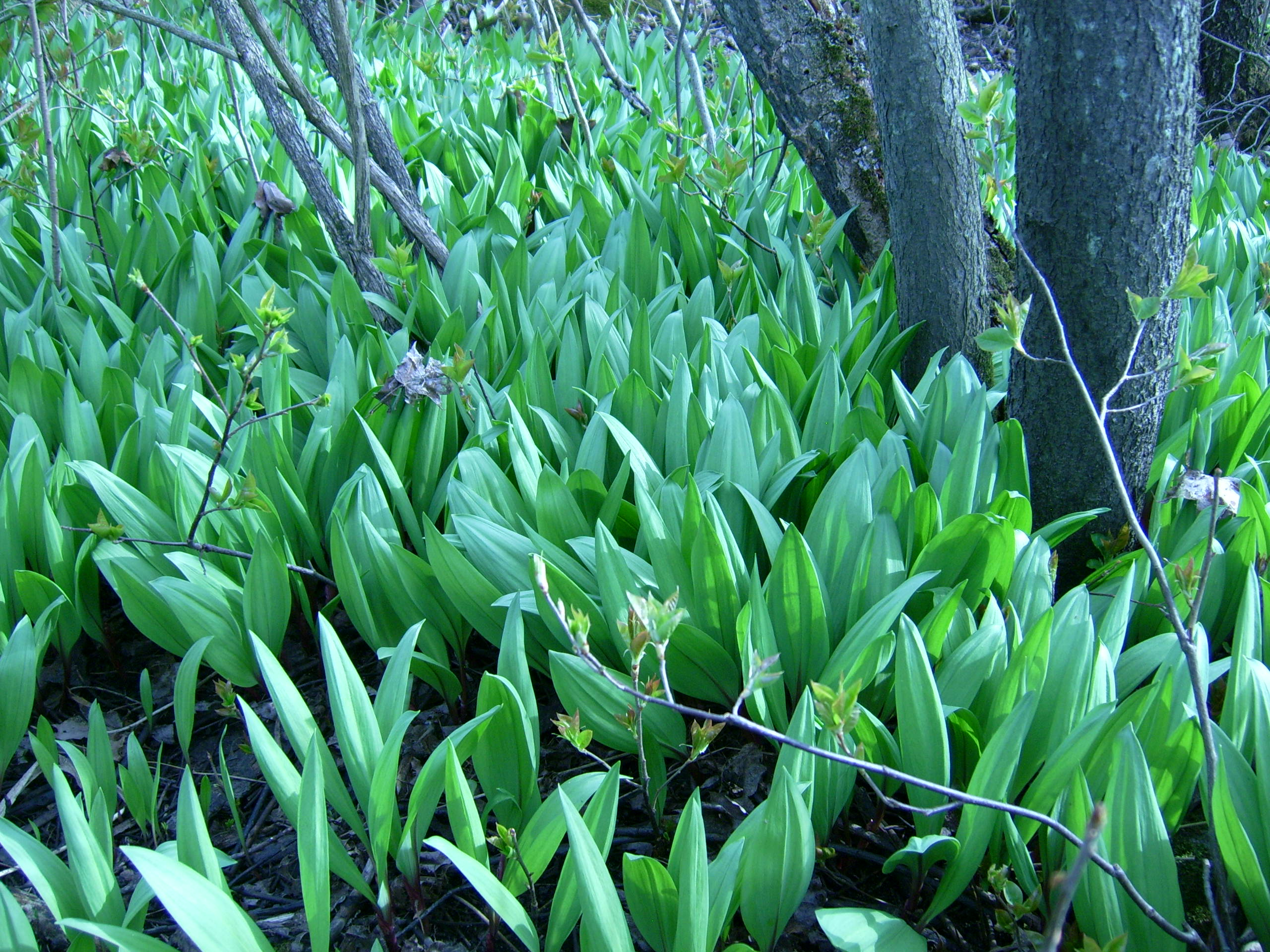
Wild leeks

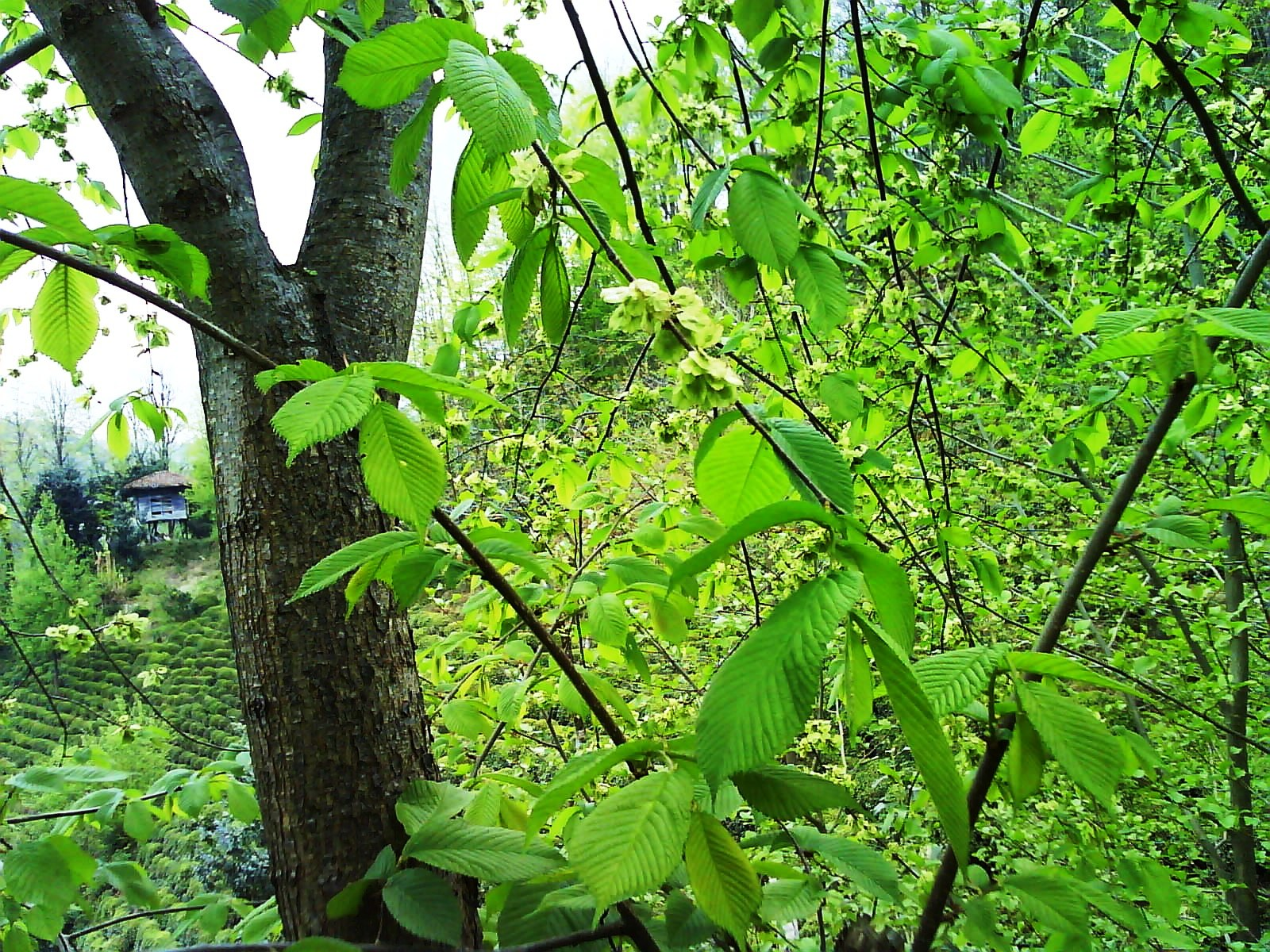
Wych elm

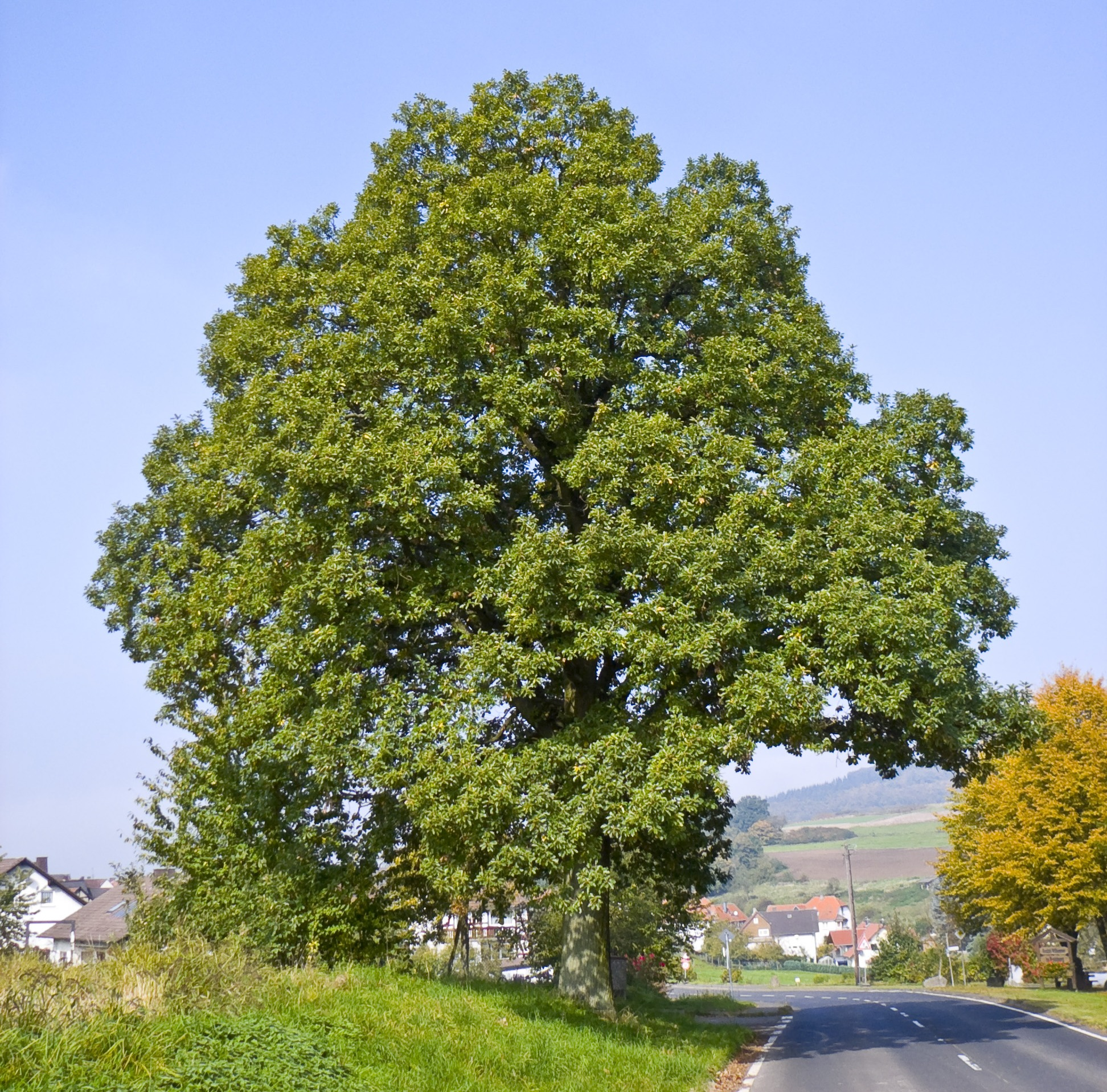
Sessile oak

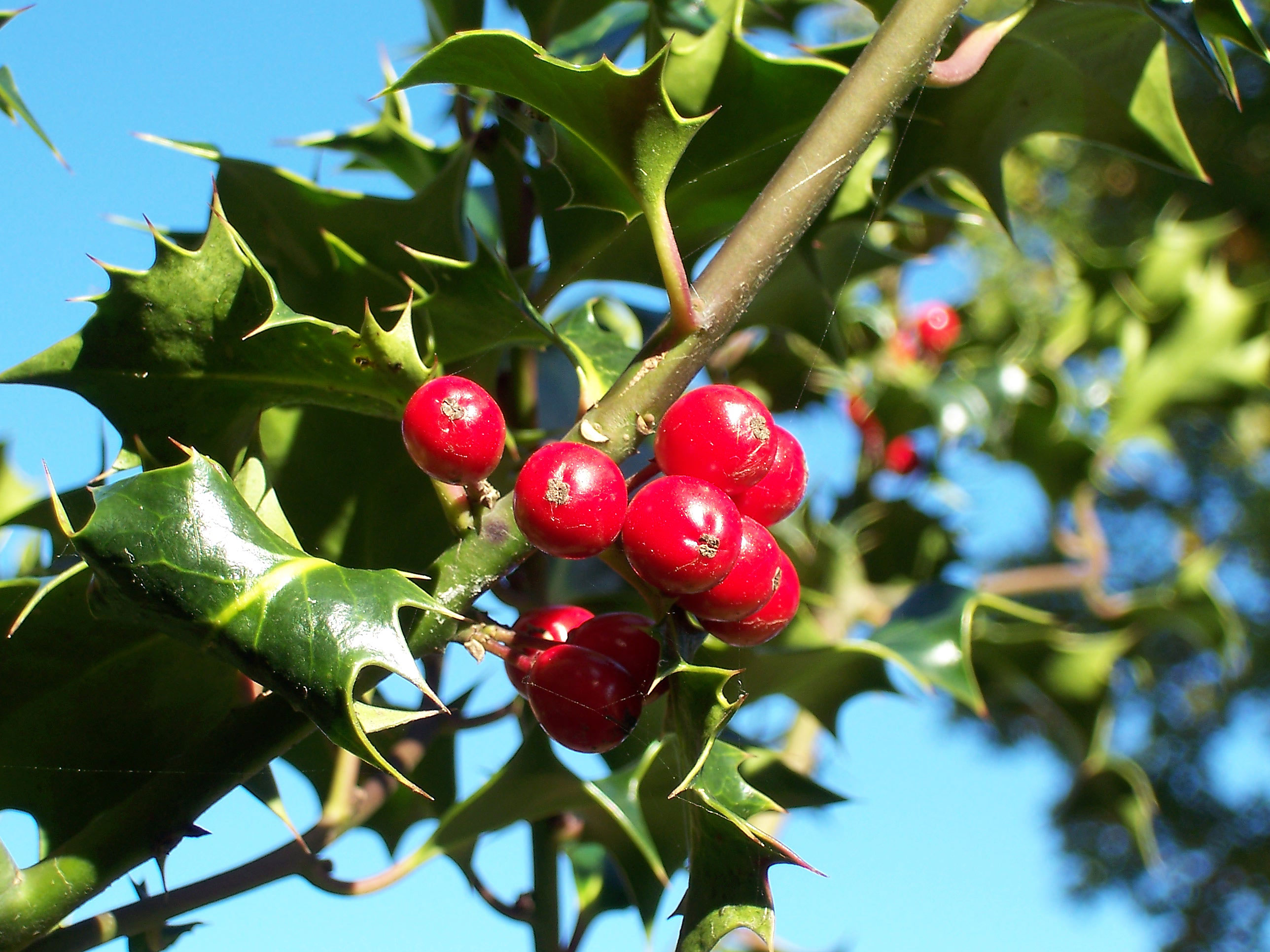
Holly

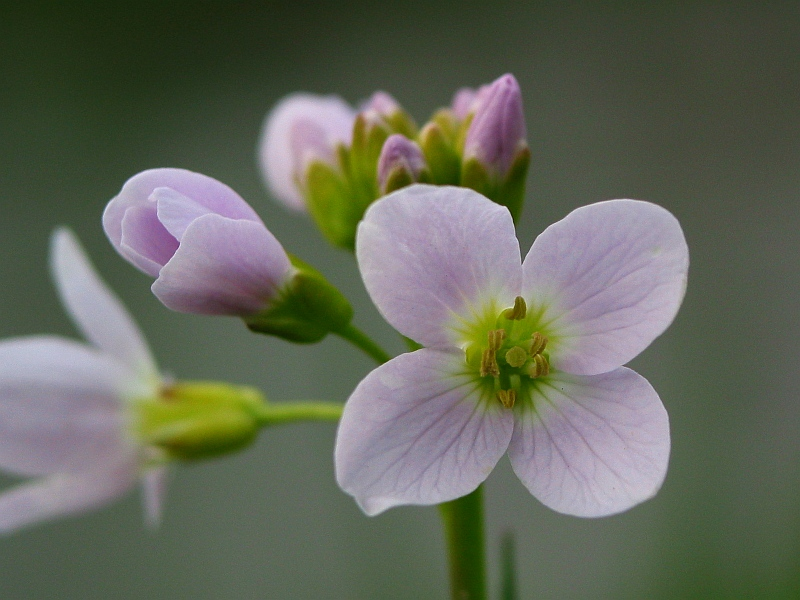
Cuckoo flower

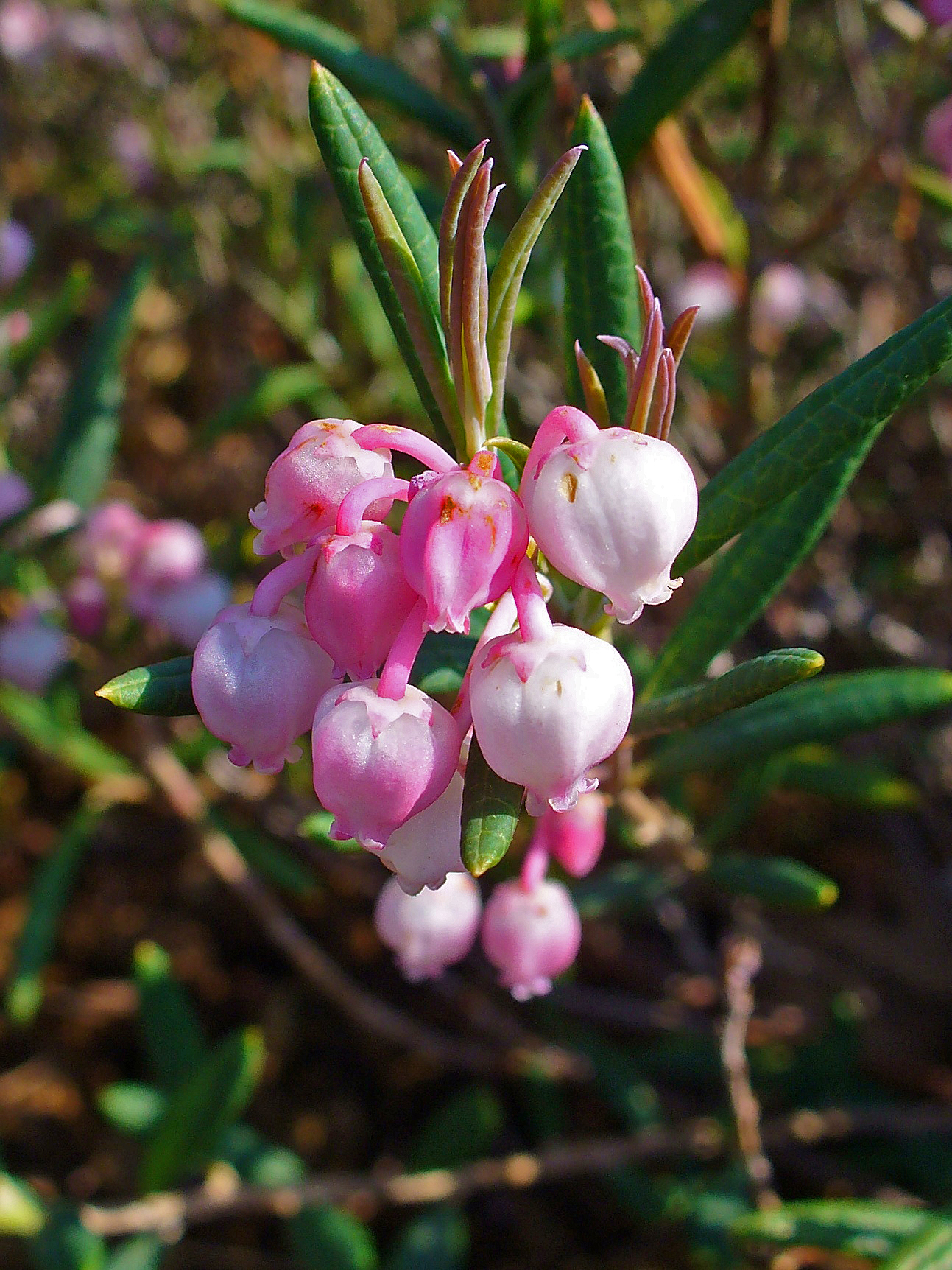
Bog rosemary

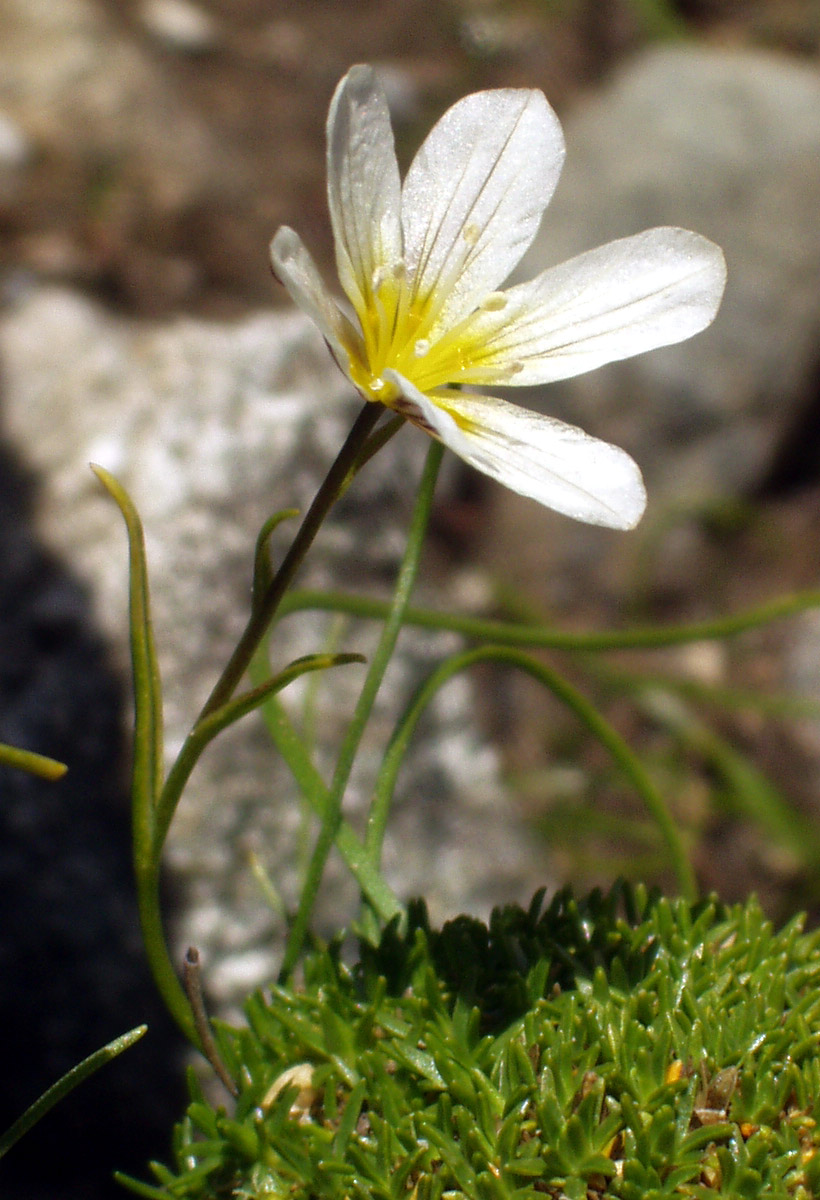
Snowdon lily

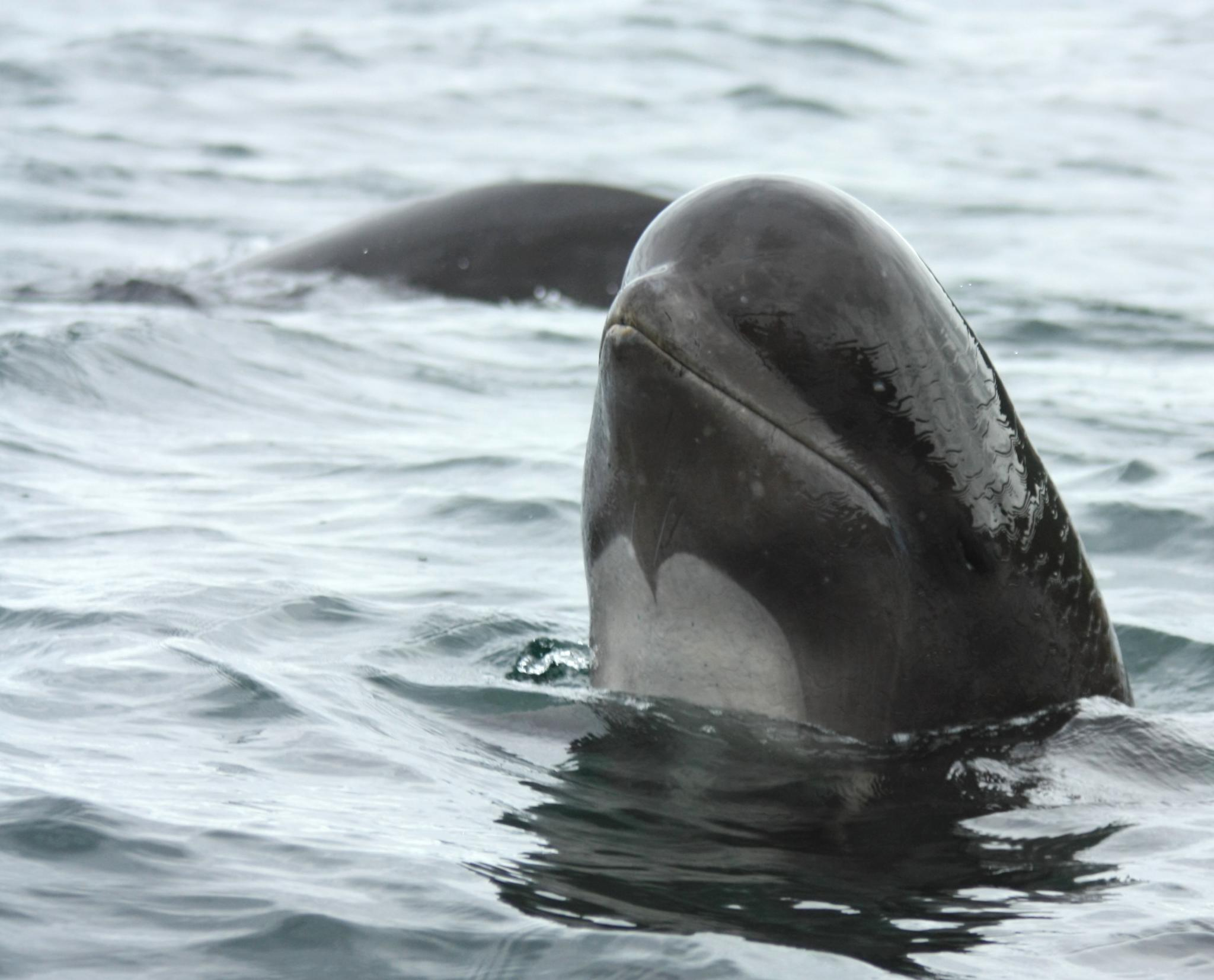
Pilot whale

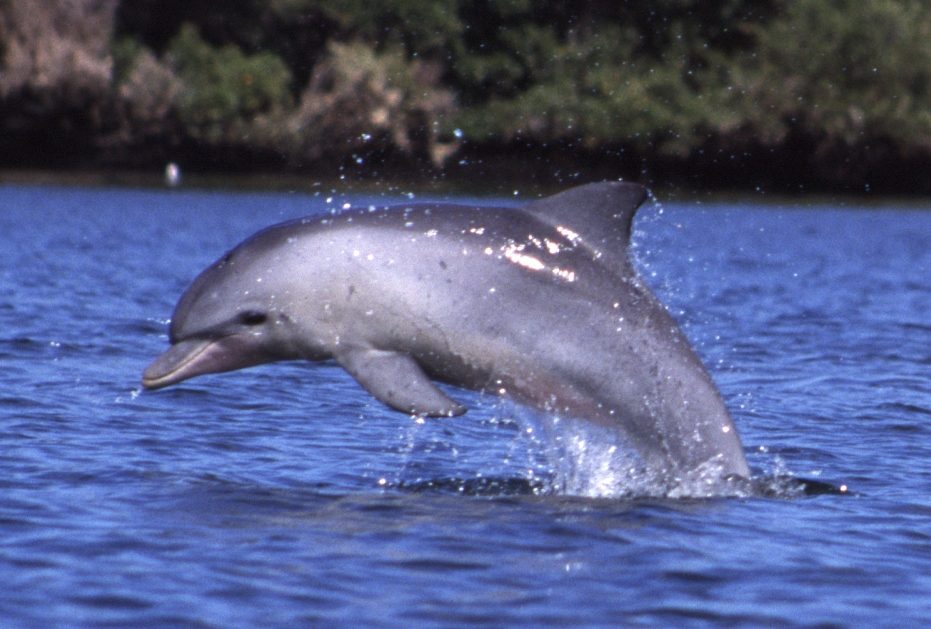
Bottlenose dolphin

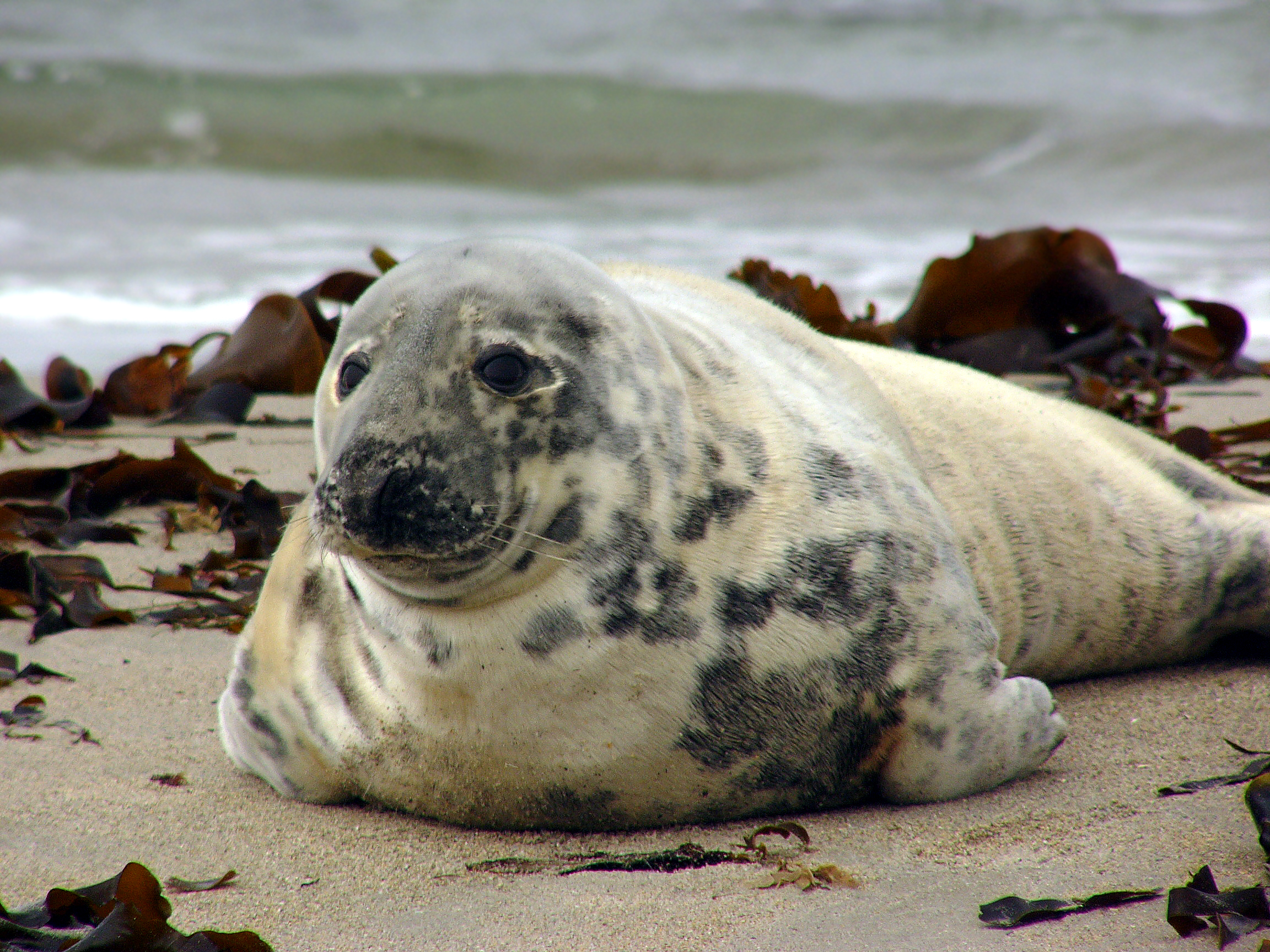
Grey seal

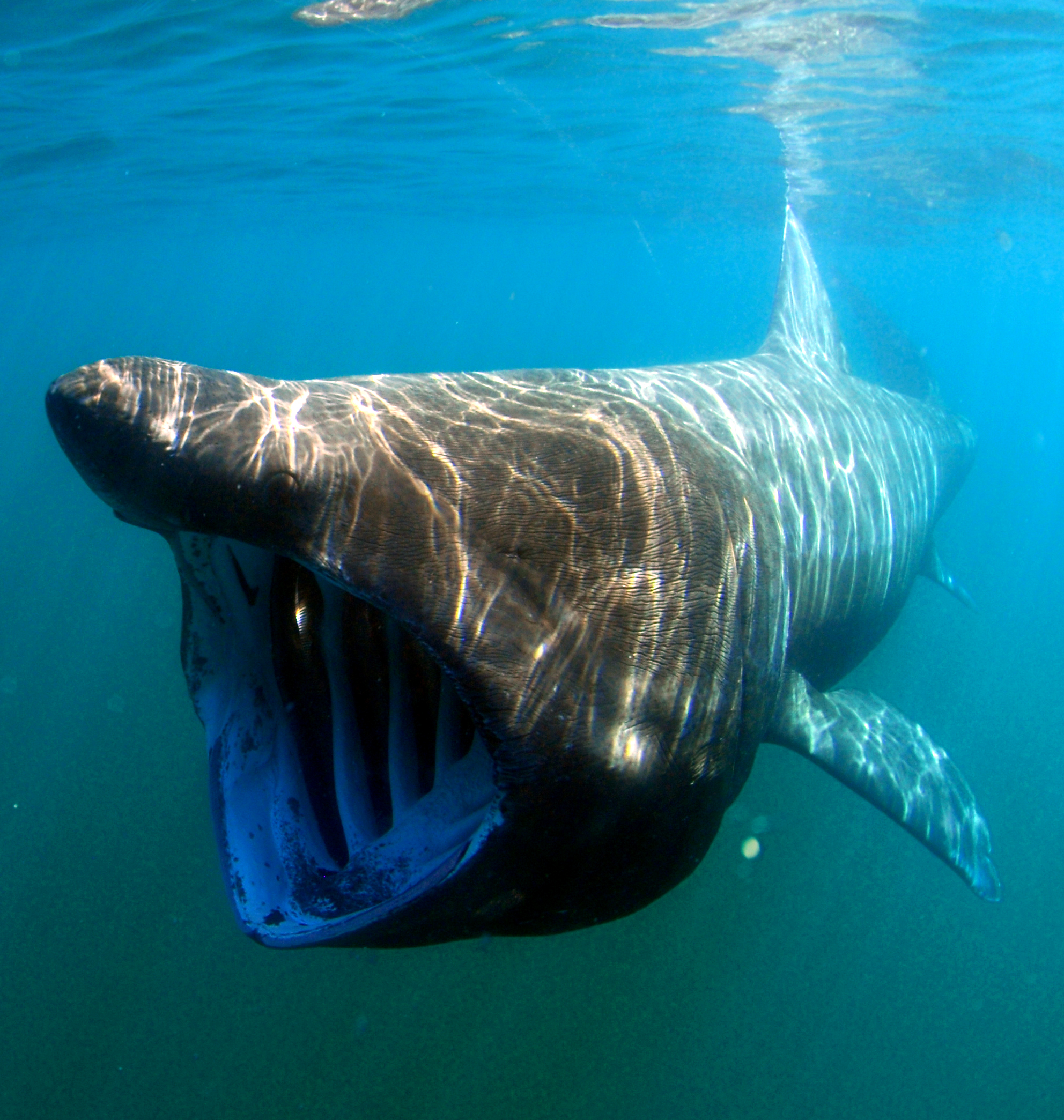
Basking shark

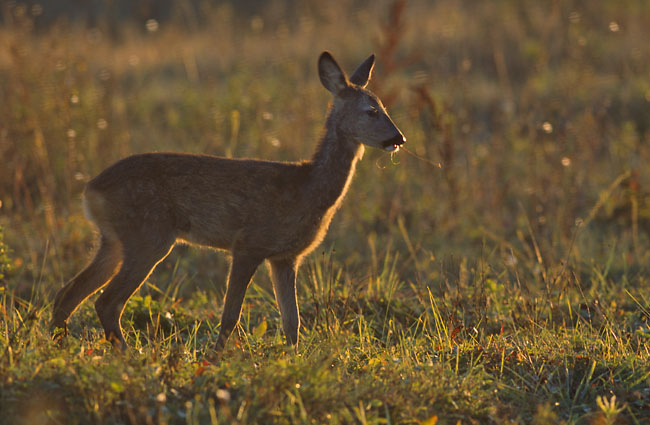
Roe deer

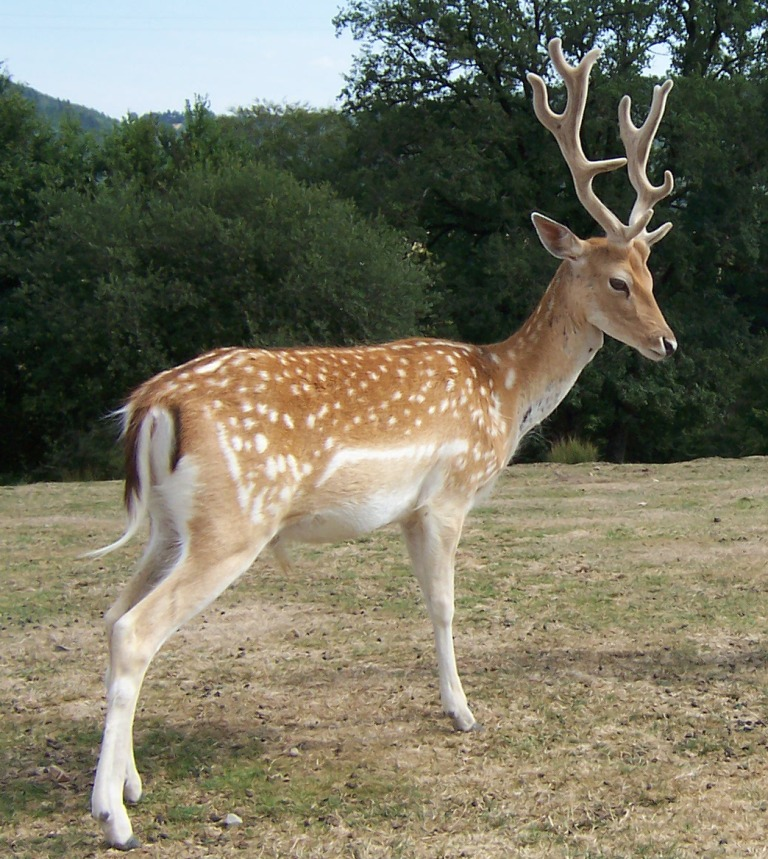
Fallow deer

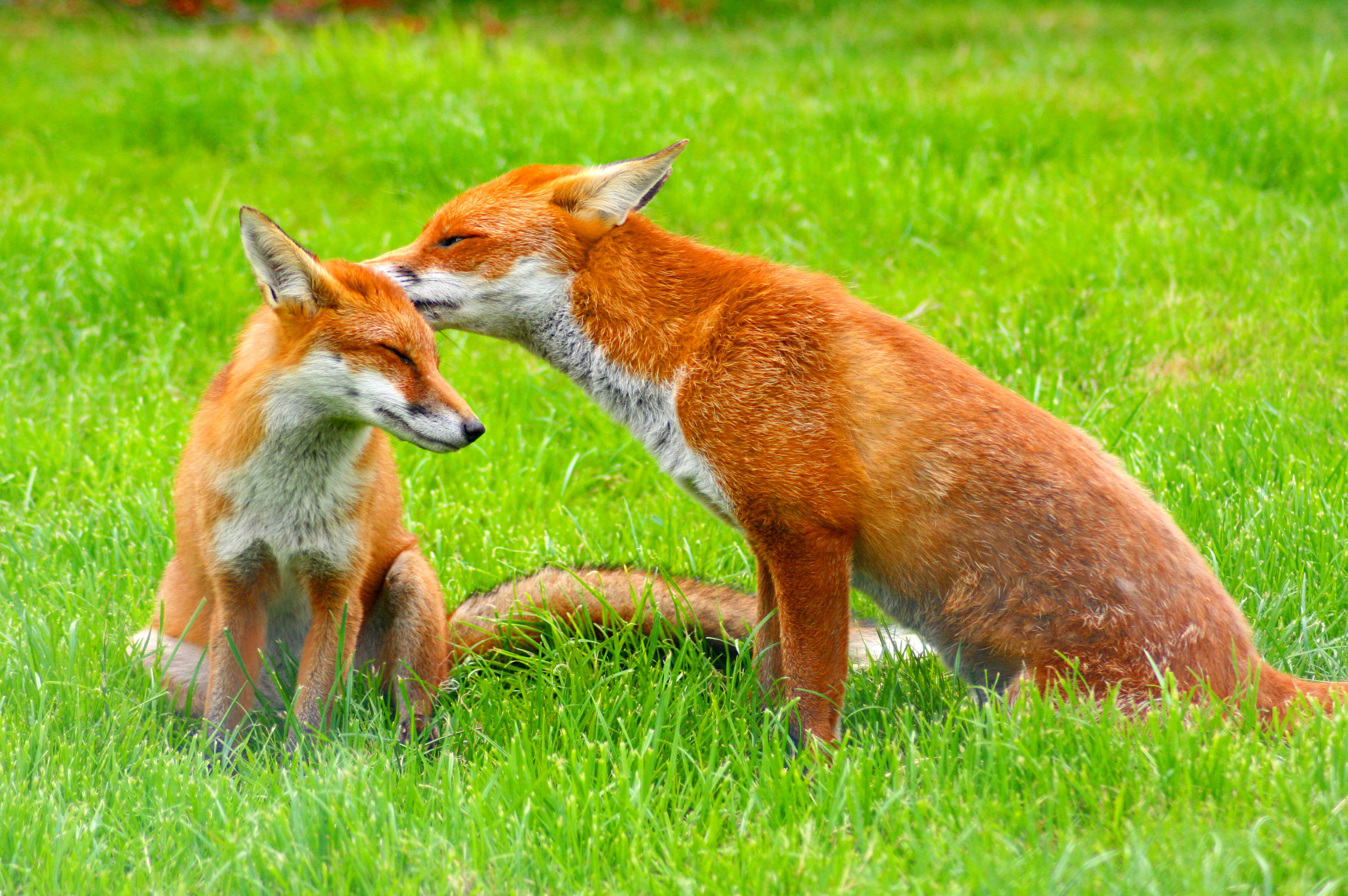
Red fox

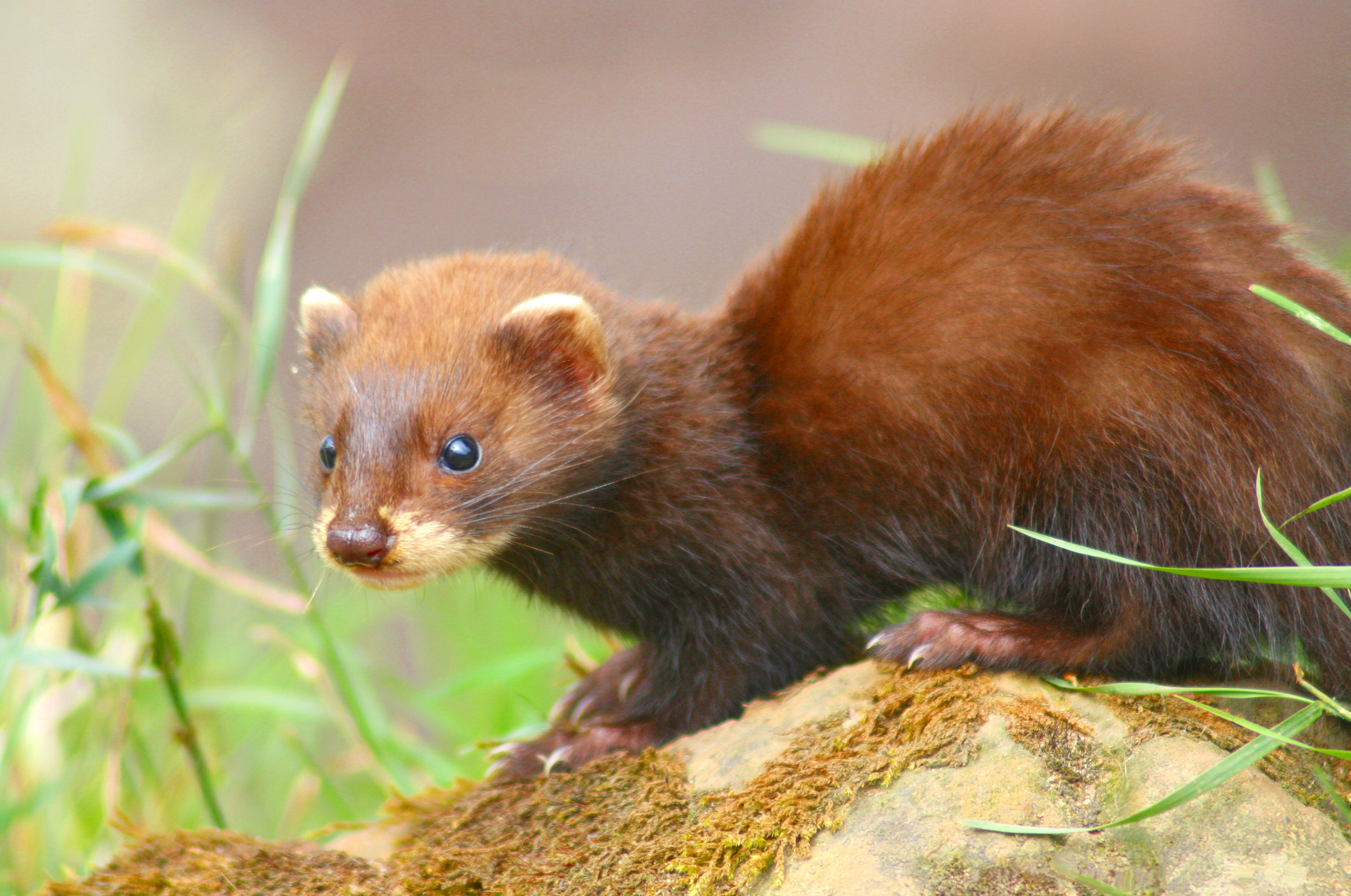
European polecat

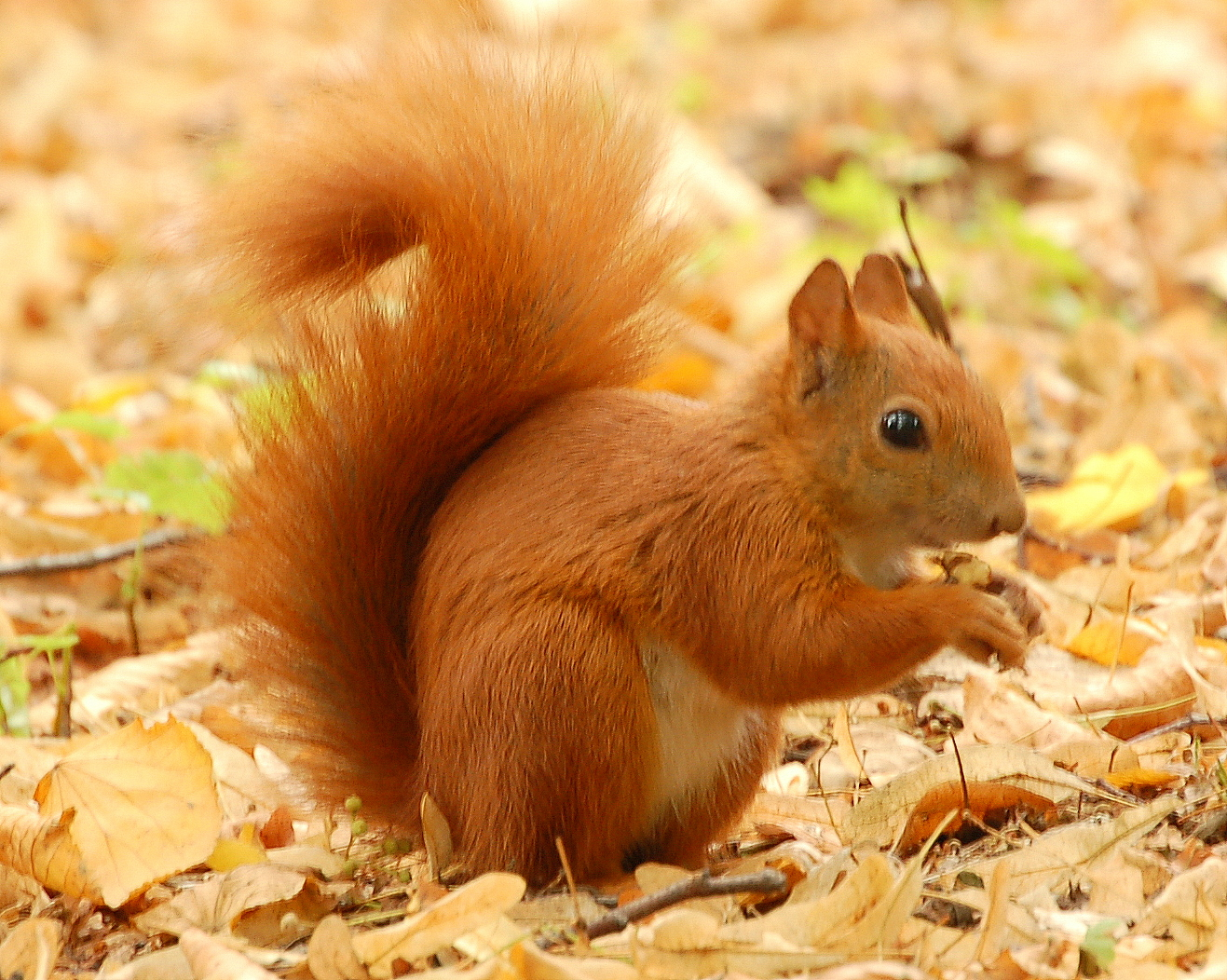
Red squirrel

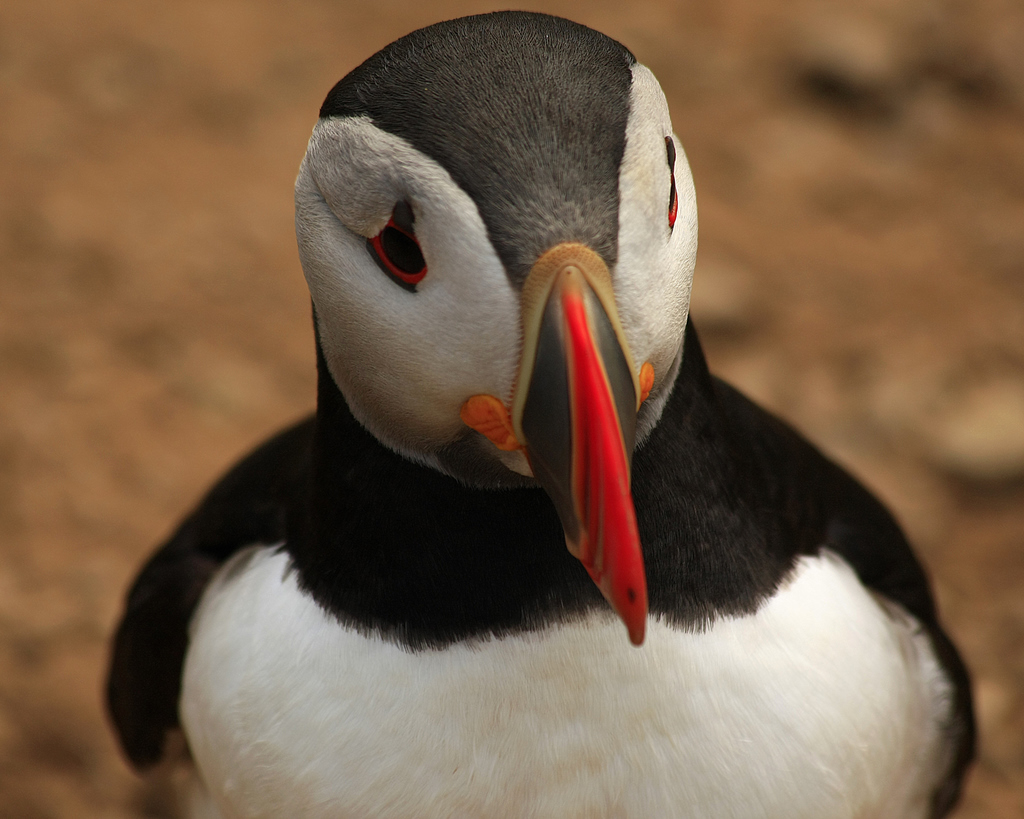
Puffin

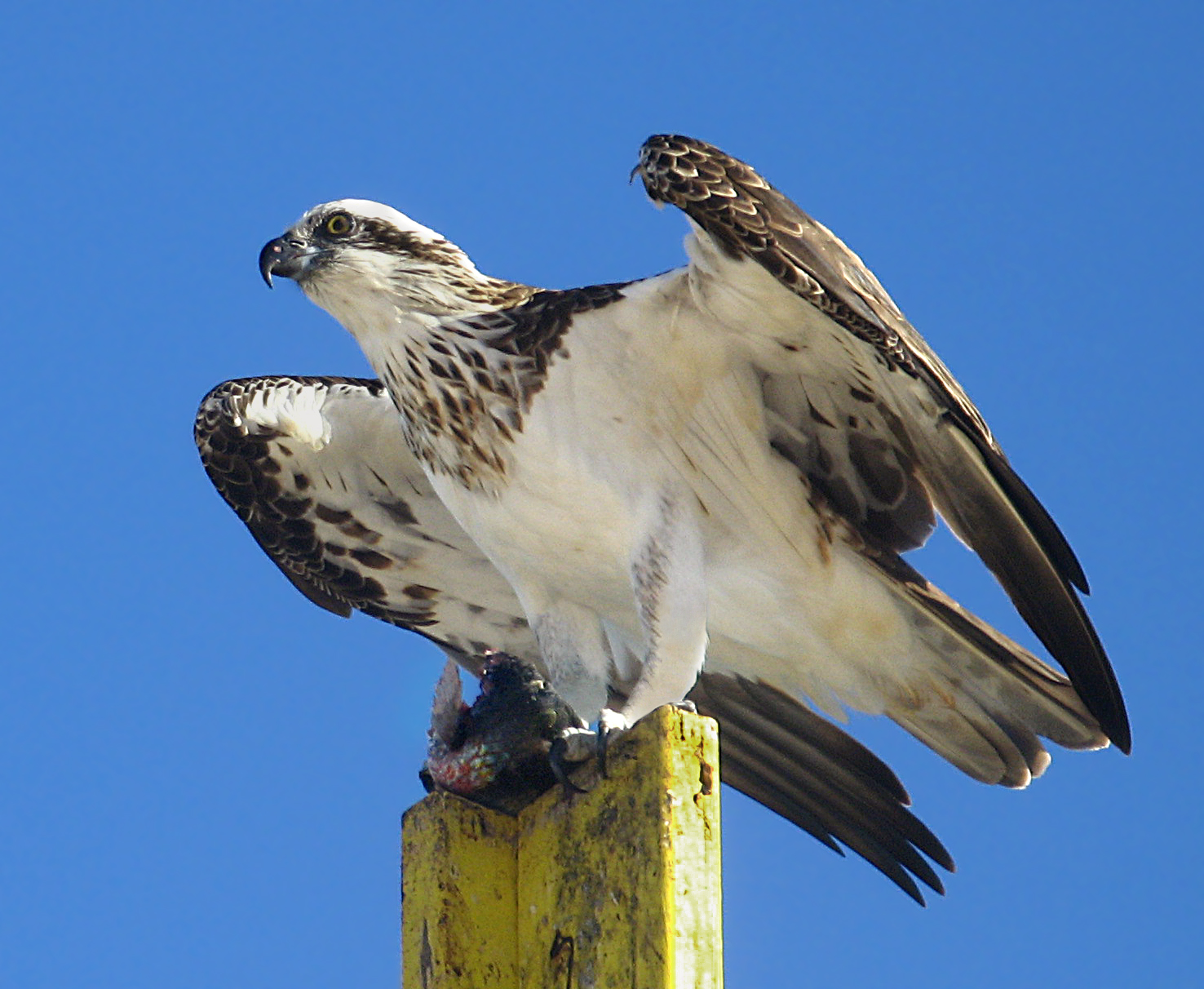
Osprey

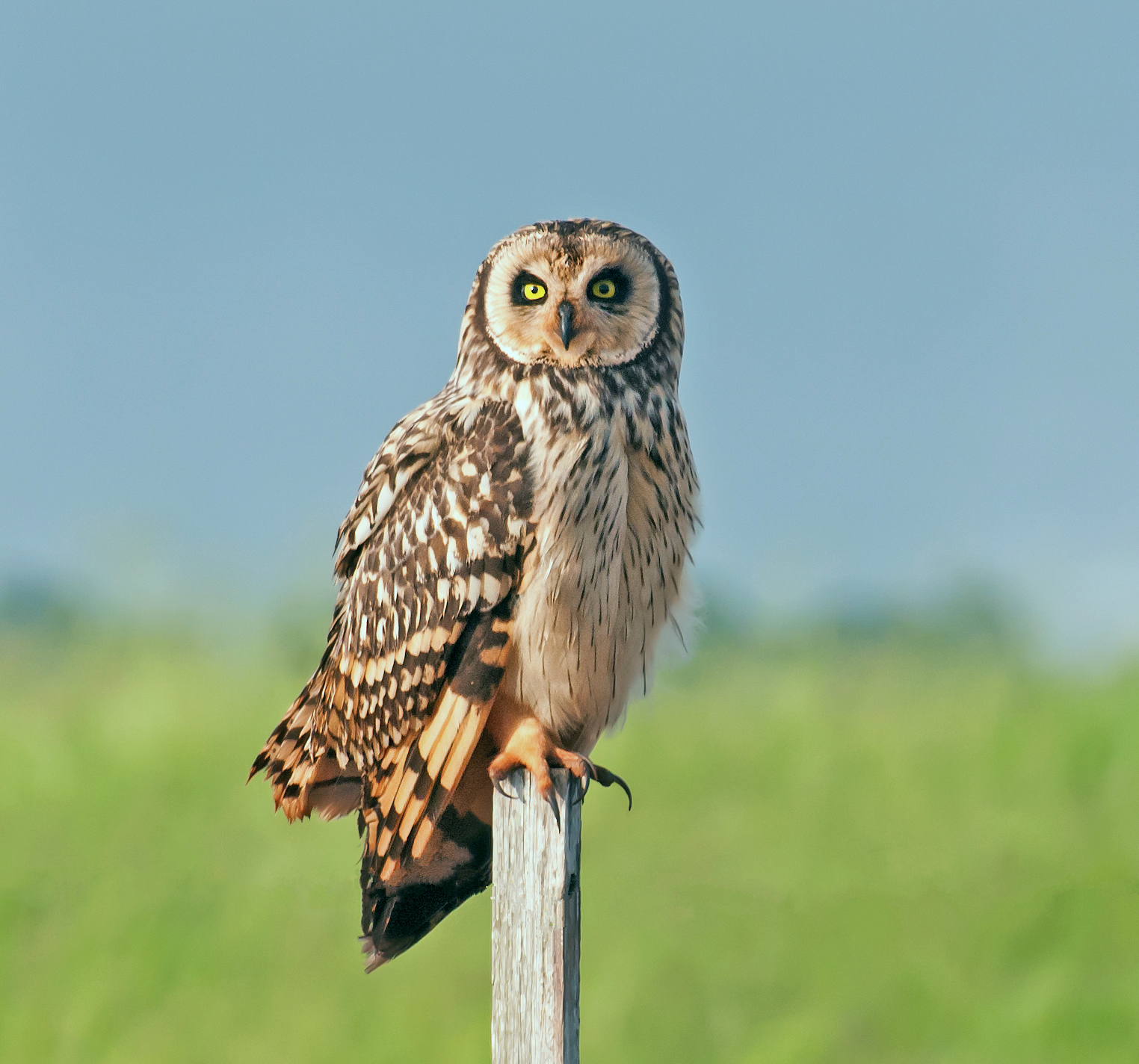
Short-eared owl

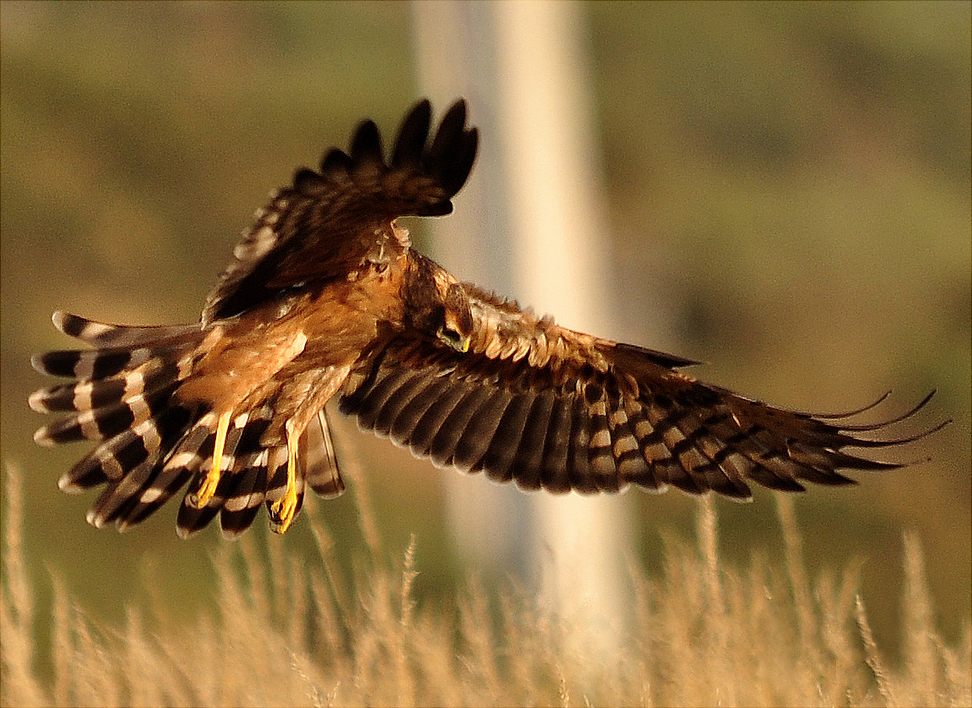
Montagu's harrier

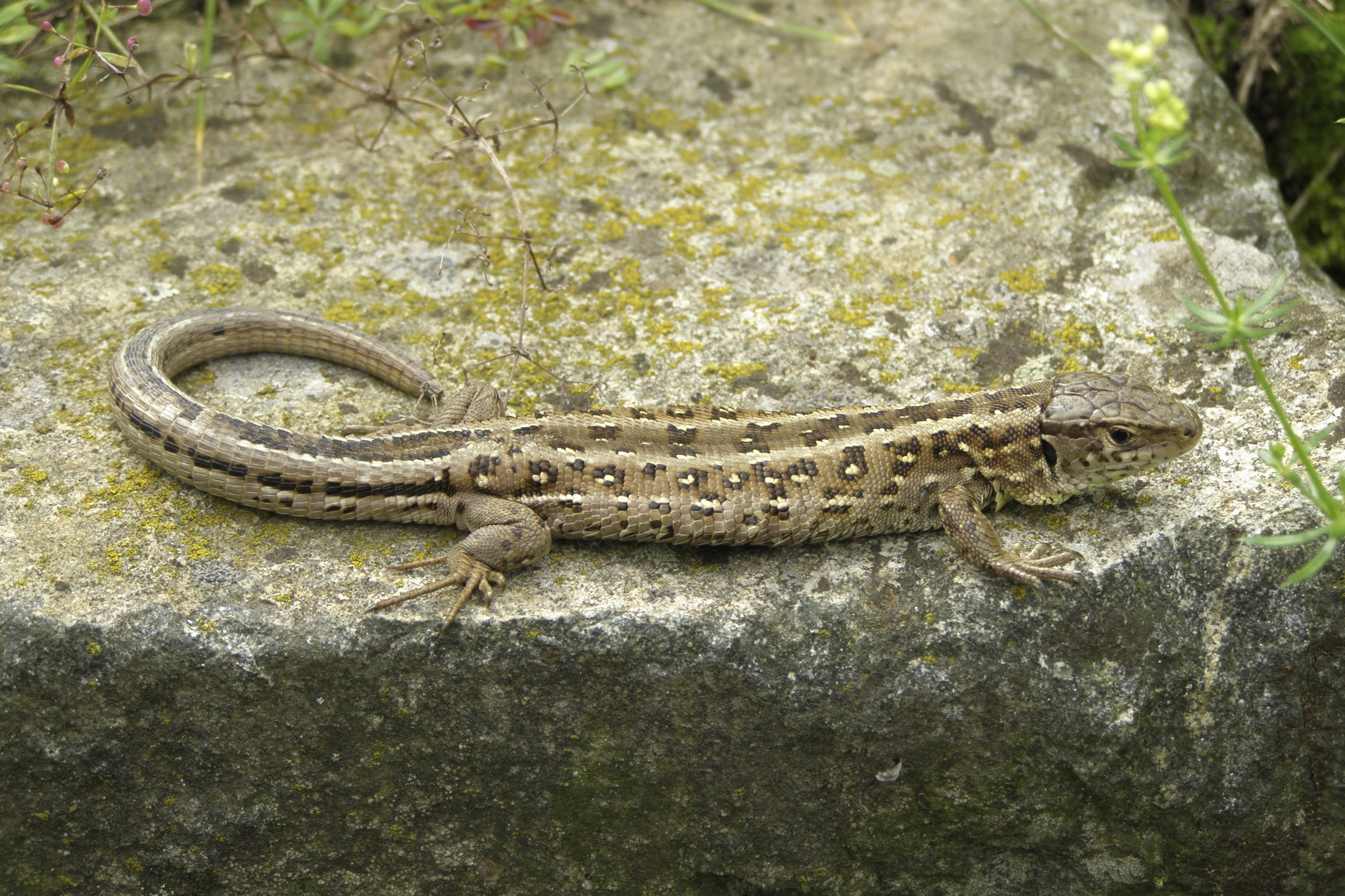
Sand lizard

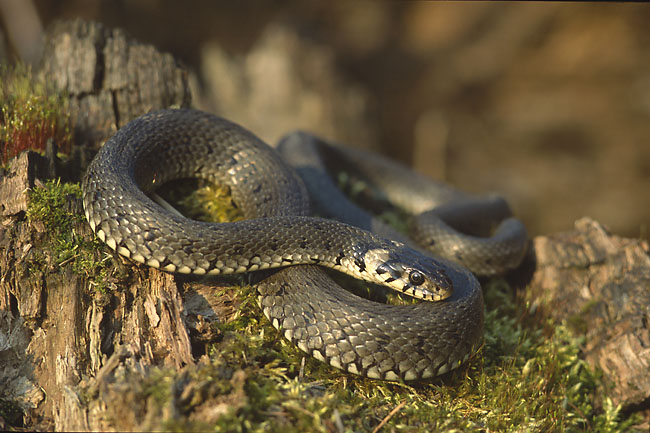
Grass snake

== See also ==
=== Biodiversity ===
- Flora of Wales
- Fauna of Wales

=== Areas ===
- List of local nature reserves in Wales
- National nature reserves in Wales
- Protected areas of Wales
- List of Special Areas of Conservation in Wales
- List of habitats of principal importance in Wales

=== Organisations ===
- Wildlife Trust of South and West Wales
- North Wales Wildlife Trust
- Radnorshire Wildlife Trust

=== Law ===
- Wildlife law in England and Wales
- List of invasive non-native species in England and Wales
