= Snowden (surname) =

Snowden is an English surname. Notable people with the surname include:

- A. Loudon Snowden (1835–1912), American diplomat
- Akeesha Snowden (born 2005), Australian para-athlete
- Andrew Snowden (born 1984), British politician
- Cal Snowden (born 1946), former American football player
- Charles Snowden (born 1998), American football player
- Christopher Snowden (born 1956), English engineer, academic and executive
- Dave Snowden (born 1954), Welsh knowledge management consultant and researcher
- Edward Snowden (born 1983), American-Russian whistleblower who disclosed U.S. National Security Agency's mass surveillance programs
- Elmer Snowden (1900–1973), American jazz musician
- Ethel Snowden (1881–1951), British socialist and feminist politician
- George Holburn Snowden (1901–1990), American sculptor
- George Snowden (1904–1982), American dancer
- Gilda Snowden (1954–2014), African American artist from Detroit
- Grant Snowden, American policeman and criminal defendant
- Helen Martanie Snowden, (1860–1925), American artist
- James Ross Snowden (1809–1878), Treasurer and Director of the U.S. Mint
- Jeffrey Snowden (born 1973), English cricketer
- John M. Snowden (1776–1845), Mayor of Pittsburgh, Pennsylvania, 1825–1828
- John Snowden (sport shooter), New Zealand sport shooter
- Kade Snowden (born 1986), Australian rugby league footballer
- Laura Snowden (born 1989), British classical guitarist and composer
- Leigh Snowden (1929–1982), an American actress in motion pictures and television
- M.L. Snowden, American sculptor
- Philip Snowden, 1st Viscount Snowden (1864–1937), British Labour Party politician
- Raymond Snowden (1921–1957), American murderer executed in Idaho
- Richard Snowden (ironmaster) (1640–1711), founder of Maryland's first iron works near present-day Laurel, Maryland
- Smith Snowden (born 2005), American football player
- Sylvia Snowden, African American abstract painter
- Vivianna Olivia Snowden, (1840–1892) was a preacher and activist who went by the name Anna Oliver professionally

== See also ==
- Snowden (character), a fictional character from the novel Catch-22 by Joseph Heller
- Snowden (disambiguation)
- Snowdon (disambiguation)
- Sowden, a surname
