= Flora of Wales =

Plant life of Wales

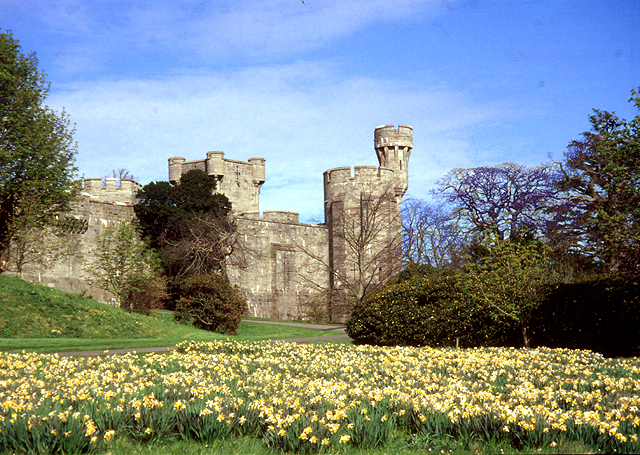
Daffodils at Penrhyn Castle, Bangor.

The flora of Wales is the assemblage of plant life in Wales.

== Trees ==
The sessile oak (Quercus petraea), one of Wales' most common species, can be found across the region. English holly (Ilex aquifolium), one of the few native evergreen trees, can be found in southern Wales. The wych elm (Ulmus glabra), a native species, suffers from disease and competition introduced by exotic species.

== Flowers ==
The cuckoo flower (Cardamine pratensis), a herbaceous perennial, can be found throughout Wales. Bog rosemary (Andromeda polifolia), a small flowering shrub, can be found in central Wales. Within the British Isles, the Snowdon lily (Gagea serotina) is found only on the slopes of Snowdon.

== Important Plant Areas ==
Important Plant Areas (IPAs) in Wales are areas of "the highest botanical importance" as determined by Plantlife.

County / Historic county	Species	Habitat
Anglesey	Spotted rock-rose (Tuberaria guttata)	Dry, rocky places
Brecknockshire	Cuckooflower (Cardamine pratensis)	Wet grassland and pond margins
Caernarvonshire	Snowdon lily (Gagea serotina)	Mountain rocks
Cardiff	Wild leek (Allium ampeloprasum)	Sandy and rocky places near the sea
Cardiganshire	Bog-rosemary (Andromeda polifolia)	Mid-Wales
Carmarthenshire	Whorled caraway (Carum verticillatum)	Damp meadows
Denbighshire	Limestone woundwort (Stachys alpina)	Roadsides and hedges
Flintshire	Bell heather (Erica cinerea)	Heaths and moors
Glamorgan	Yellow whitlow-grass (Draba aizoides)	Rocks and old walls
Merioneth	Welsh poppy (Meconopsis cambrica)	Damp, shady rocks
Monmouthshire	Foxglove (Digitalis purpurea)	Woodland clearings, heaths and banks
Montgomeryshire	Spiked speedwell (Veronica spicata)	Limestone rocks
Pembrokeshire	Thrift (Armeria maritima)	Coastal cliffs or astride craggy islands
Radnorshire	Radnor lily (Gagea bohemica)	Limestone rocks
