= Lord Snowdon (disambiguation) =

Lord Snowdon may refer to:

- Earl of Snowdon, a hereditary title created in 1961
  - Antony Armstrong-Jones, 1st Earl of Snowdon (1930–2017), husband of Princess Margaret, sister of Queen Elizabeth II
  - David Armstrong-Jones, 2nd Earl of Snowdon (born 1961), son of the 1st Earl of Snowdon

Lord Snowden may refer to:

- Philip Snowden, 1st Viscount Snowden (1864–1937), British politician and two-time Chancellor of the Exchequer
- Richard Snowden, Lord Snowden of Redcar (b. 1962), justice of the Supreme Court of the United Kingdom

== See also ==
- Snowdon (disambiguation)
- Snowden (disambiguation)
