= Countess of Snowdon =

Countess of Snowdon may refer to:

- Princess Margaret, Countess of Snowdon (1930–2002), youngest child of George VI and first wife of Antony Armstrong-Jones, 1st Earl of Snowdon
- Lucy Armstrong-Jones, Countess of Snowdon, second wife of Antony Armstrong-Jones, 1st Earl of Snowdon
- Serena Armstrong-Jones, Countess of Snowdon (born 1970), estranged wife of David Armstrong-Jones, 2nd Earl of Snowdon

== See also ==
- Earl of Snowdon
- Snowdon (disambiguation)
