= Snodin =

Snodin is a surname. Notable people with the surname include:

- Glynn Snodin (born 1960), English football player and manager
- Ian Snodin (born 1963), English football player, manager, and sports analyst
- Jeff Snodin (born 1965), English cyclist

== See also ==
- Snowden (surname)
