= Snowdon (disambiguation) =

Snowdon is the highest mountain in Wales, and the highest mountain in the UK outside of Scotland.

Snowdon may also refer to:

== Places ==
- Snowdon (Devon), a hill in Dartmoor, England.
- Snowdon Massif, a mountain group in Snowdonia, Wales
- Snowdon, Montreal, a neighbourhood in Montreal, Canada
  - Snowdon (Montreal Metro), a metro station in Montreal, Canada
- Snowdon East, a town in Burma; see List of Victoria Cross recipients of the Indian Army

== People ==
- Baron Snowdon, a former subsidiary title held by the Duke of Edinburgh (1726 creation)
- Earl of Snowdon, a title in the Peerage of the United Kingdom

=== Persons with the surname ===
- Lisa Snowdon (born 1972), model
- Warren Snowdon (born 1950), Australian politician
- Will Snowdon (born 1983), English footballer

=== Titled persons ===
- Antony Armstrong-Jones, 1st Earl of Snowdon or Lord Snowdon (1930-2017), British photographer
- Princess Margaret, Countess of Snowdon (1930–2002), British princess
- David Armstrong-Jones, 2nd Earl of Snowdon, (b.1961), British furniture maker

== Other uses ==
- Snowdon lily (Gagea serotina), a plant

== See also ==
- Lord Snowdon (disambiguation)
- Snowdonia, a region and national park in Wales
- Snowdon Mountain Railway, a railway that goes to the summit of the mountain
- Portmadoc, Beddgelert and South Snowdon Railway, a narrow gauge railway
- Snowden (disambiguation)
  - Edward Snowden (born 1983), former government contractor who leaked classified information from the US National Security Agency
  - Philip Snowden, 1st Viscount Snowden
