= Licorice (EP) =

Licorice EP

EP by Snowden
- Released: 2005
- Genre: Alternative rock Indie rock
- Length: 15:39

Snowden chronology
Black Eyes 7"	Licorice EP	Anti-Anti

Licorice EP is Snowden's third release, and was released in 2005. It contains songs about Christmas. "White Christmas" and "Christmas Time is Here" are traditional songs. The second track, "Happy Christmas (War is Over)" is a cover of a song by John Lennon.

== Track listing ==
1. "White Christmas"
2. "Happy Christmas (War is Over)"
3. "Christmas Time is Here"
4. "China Light"
