= Sowden =

Sowden is an English-language surname. Notable people with this name include:

- Arthur Sowden (1878–1954), Australian rules footballer
- Billy Sowden (1930–2010), English (soccer) footballer
- Des Sowden (born 1974), English professional boxer
- George Sowden (born 1942), English designer and product developer in Milan, Italy
- John Sowden (1838–1926), English watercolourist and businessman
- Paddy Sowden, Peter Tasker Sowden (1929–2010), English (soccer) footballer
- Robin Sowden-Taylor (born 1982), Welsh international rugby player
- William Henry Sowden (1840–1907), U.S. Representative from Pennsylvania
- William John Sowden (1858–1943), South Australian journalist

== See also ==
- Snowden (surname)
