= Anti-Anti =

Studio album by Snowden
- Released: August 22, 2006
- Studio: Cacophony Recorders
- Genre: Alternative rock, indie rock
- Length: 48:20
- Label: Jade Tree Records
- Producer: Erik Wofford

Snowden chronology
Licorice EP (2005)	Anti-Anti (2006)	Fuel of the Celebration (2007)

Professional ratings
Review scores
Source	Rating
Allmusic	3.5 /5 stars
Pitchfork Media	(7.2/10)

Anti-Anti is the debut album by the band Snowden. Some tracks on this album are also on The Snowden EP.

== Track listing ==
1. "Like Bullets"
2. "Anti-Anti"
3. "My Murmuring Darling"
4. "Filler Is Wasted"
5. "Black Eyes"
6. "Between the Rent and Me"
7. "Counterfeit Rules"
8. "Innocent Heathen"
9. "Stop Your Bleeding"
10. "Kill the Power"
11. "Victim Card"
12. "Sisters"

== Personnel ==
- Jordan Jeffares - guitar, keyboards, lead vocals
- Chandler Rentz - drums, vocals
- Corinne Lee - bass, keyboards, vocals
- David Payne - guitar

=== Credits ===
- Erik Wofford - noise, producer, engineer, mixing
- Alan Douches - mastering
