= Snowden (band) =

American indie rock band

- Origin: Atlanta, Georgia
- Genres: Indie rock
- Years active: 2003–present
- Labels: Serpents & Snakes, Jade Tree Records
- Members: Jordan Jeffares; Keith Vogelsong; Yoi Fujita; Mikey Jones
- Past members: Chandler Rentz; Corinne Lee; David Payne; Brandon Ivey; Anthony Davis; Aimee Rydarowski
- Website: Official website

Snowden was an indie rock band fronted by musician and songwriter Jordan Jeffares. The name is inspired by Snowden, a fictional character from the novel Catch-22 by Joseph Heller.

== History ==
Snowden started out in Jeffares' bedroom, where he recorded demos. These demos impressed Jeffares' brother Preston Craig, who then introduced other musicians to Jeffares, thus beginning Snowden. Snowden self released The Snowden EP, which was received with immense local success. They landed spots opening for groups such as Clap Your Hands Say Yeah, and Arcade Fire. In 2006, Jade Tree signed the band and released their debut album Anti-Anti. The album gained immediate attention, as evidenced by its making the "most blogged" band on the Internet according to elbo.ws and getting airplay by Steve Lamacq (BBC). In 2007, the band released videos for "Like Bullets" and "Anti-Anti" and made radio appearances around the country. They recorded special features for Comcast, AOL/Spin, and had a concert at Manhattan's Bowery Ballroom (recorded November 2006) released on DVD by Baeble Music. In addition, they embarked upon a full US tour opening for Kings of Leon, and were invited to open several European dates as well.

On March 25, 2010, Snowden released the Slow Soft Syrup EP as a free download online. The five track EP is a WIP preview of songs from the forthcoming full length follow up to Anti-Anti to be released on the Serpents & Snakes label, with whom the band signed in August 2011. The band suddenly achieved attention in 2013 due to media coverage of Edward Snowden. Jeffares, however, has claimed it has made little difference to their popularity.

== Discography ==
=== Albums ===
- Anti-Anti 2006 Jade Tree Records
- No One In Control 2013 Serpents and Snakes Records

=== EPs ===
- Snowden EP 2005
- Black Eyes 7" 2005 Stick Figure Distribution
- Licorice EP 2005
- Fuel of the Celebration 2007
- Slow Soft Syrup EP 2010
