= George Holburn Snowden =

American sculptor (1901–1990)

George Holburn Snowden NA (December 17, 1901 – December 15, 1990) was an American sculptor. He was elected to the National Academy of Design in 1941, received the 1927 Rome Prize, and received the Royal Academy Order of Merit. He was an apprentice to Robert George Eberhard, chairman of the Yale School of Sculpture and protégé of Auguste Rodin. Snowden's work was featured in a retrospective at the Smithsonian. Snowden's daughter M.L. Snowden apprenticed under him.

== Notable works ==
- The sculptures on the 161st Street side of the Bronx County Courthouse (c. 1934)
- Pediment on The Drinkhall, Saratoga Springs, New York
