= Snowden (EP) =

Snowden EP

EP by Snowden
- Released: 2005
- Genre: Alternative rock; indie rock
- Label: Jade Tree Records

Snowden chronology
Snowden EP (2005)	Black Eyes 7" (2005)

Snowden EP is the first EP by the band Snowden, released in 2005. It contains early versions of songs which would later be reworked and released on their debut album Anti-Anti, such as "Victim Card" and "Kill the Power", as well as several exclusive songs.

== Track listing ==
1. "Victim Card"
2. "Good News"
3. "Chin Up"
4. "Kill the Power"
5. "Come Around"
6. "Anybody Else"
