= Snowden (physics) =

A Snowden is a unit of soft X-ray emissivity, equivalent to $10^{-6}$ ROSAT counts $s^{-1} arcmin^{-2}$. These units were chosen by S. L. Snowden when working with the ROSAT mission to create the ROSAT All-Sky Survey in order to make the surface brightness values fit into a two byte integer.
