= M.L. Snowden =

American sculptor (born 1952)

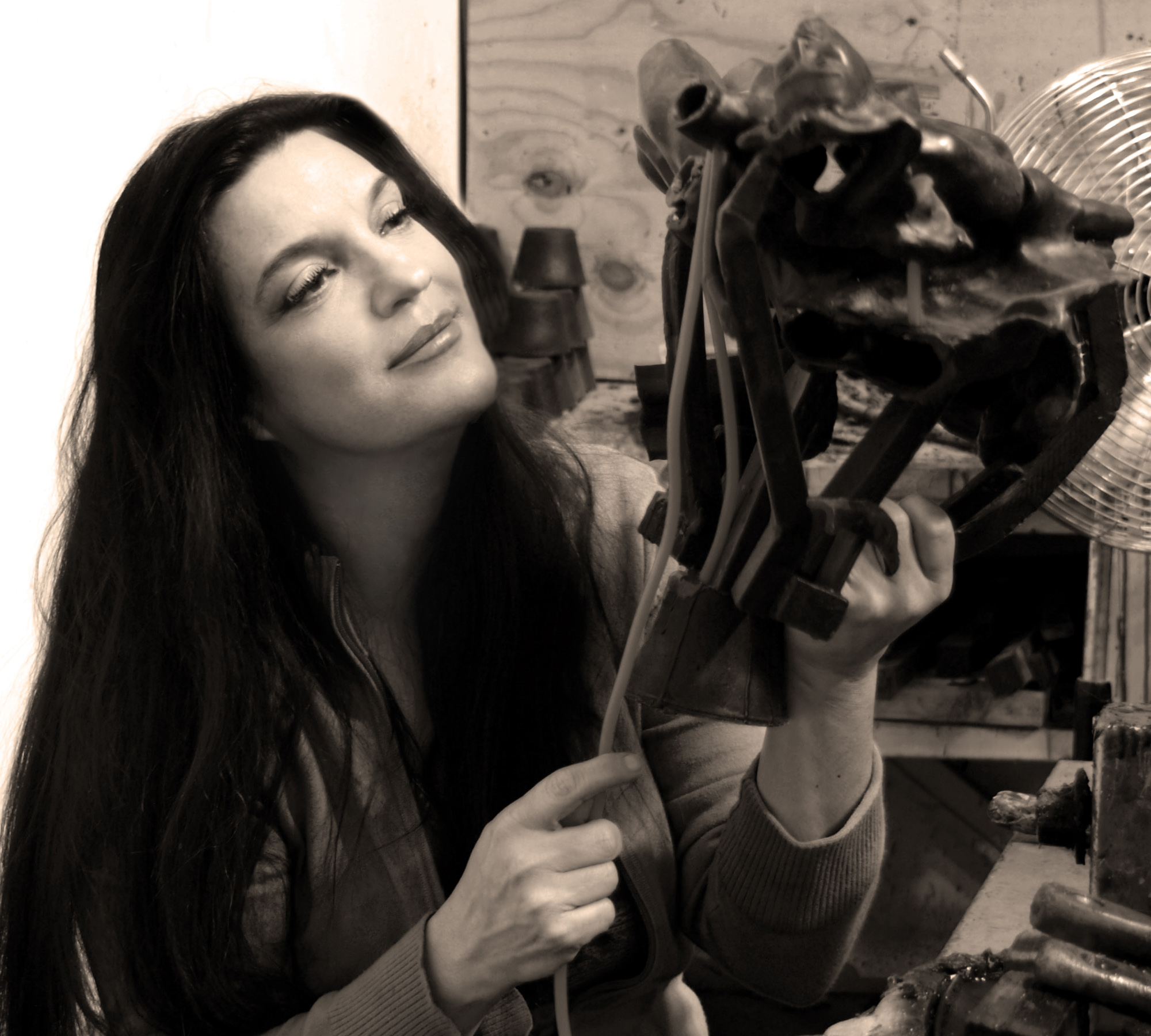
- Snowden in 2008
- Born: Mary Louise Snowden; March 15, 1952 (age 74); Hollywood, California, U.S.
- Education: Loyola Marymount University (BFA, 1974)
- Known for: Sculpture
- Notable work: Angels at Cathedral of Our Lady of the Angels
- Parents: George Holburn Snowden (father); Louise Illington (mother)

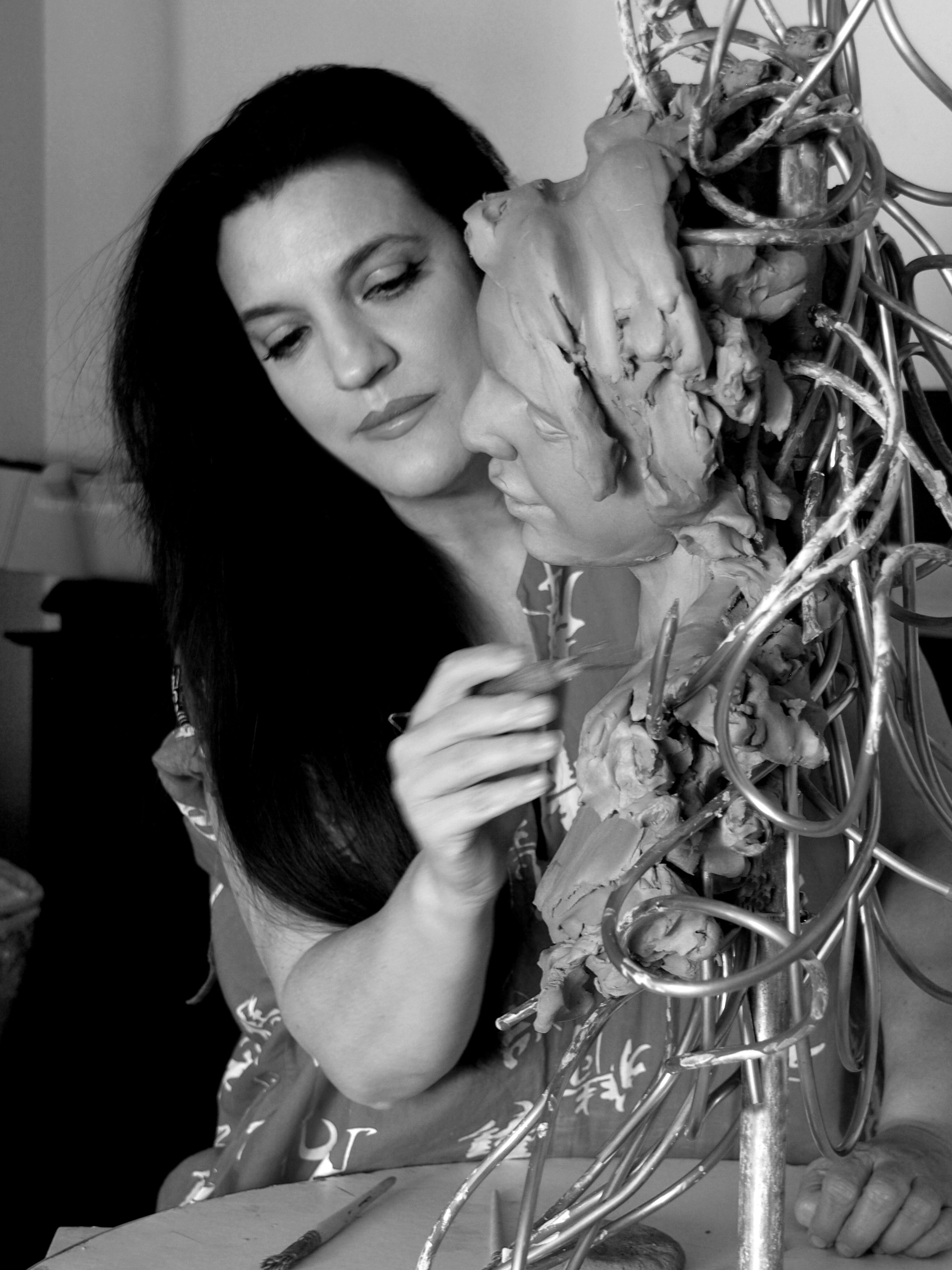
Snowden in 2009

Mary Louise Snowden (born March 15, 1952) is an American sculptor.

== Early life and education ==
Snowden was born in Hollywood, California, at Hollywood Presbyterian Medical Center, to sculptor George Holburn Snowden and stage and film actress Louise Adel Snowden (née Weider), professionally known as Louise Illington. Her mother also pursued advanced work as a doctor of biochemistry, developing natural skincare and consumer products. Snowden had one brother, George, who was a financial investor, advisor, and humanitarian philanthropist.

Snowden was raised and trained in the sculpture studios of her father, whose national landmark sculpture commissions fueled her early aspiration to become a professional sculptor. She took her first sculpture lessons from her father as he was sculpting the main altar and exterior statuary for the Basilica of the National Shrine of the Immaculate Conception in Washington, D.C.

After becoming one of the first women to enroll at Loyola Marymount University in 1970, she studied with Macdonald-Wright's protégé Pauline Khuri-Majoli and was awarded a Bachelor of Fine Arts Degree in painting and sculpture in 1974.

== Career ==
=== Cathedral of Our Lady of the Angels ===
Snowden sculpted several works for the $200 million Cathedral of Our Lady of the Angels that opened in Los Angeles's downtown Civic Center in 2002:

- Four 30-inch angels that wrap around the base of the Rosso Laguna marble main altar.
- "The Los Angeles Angelic Frieze," an 11-foot-tall, 4-inch-deep, 1-ton bronze bas-relief pane sculpted as a preliminary study for her altar angels. Displayed in the visitors center, the composition depicts Archangels Michael, Raphael, Ariel, and Gabriel. Snowden said it was sculpted with a tool that once belonged to Auguste Rodin.
- "Creation's Gate," a bronze free-standing screen bas-relief wall panel in the cathedral's Chapel 5.

=== Other works ===
- "Lunas," "Lightspire," "Photon," and "Solaris." Grand Reading Room, Ellis Library, University of Missouri
- "Cataclasis Study." Hannon Library, Loyola Marymount University in Los Angeles
- Albert Gersten Memorial (1981). Gersten Pavilion at Loyola Marymount University
- Glendale California's Civic Monument, also known as the "Shield." Civic Plaza, Glendale, California
