= Snowden Crags =

Archaeological site in England

Coordinates: 53°57′15.64″N 1°43′51.61″W

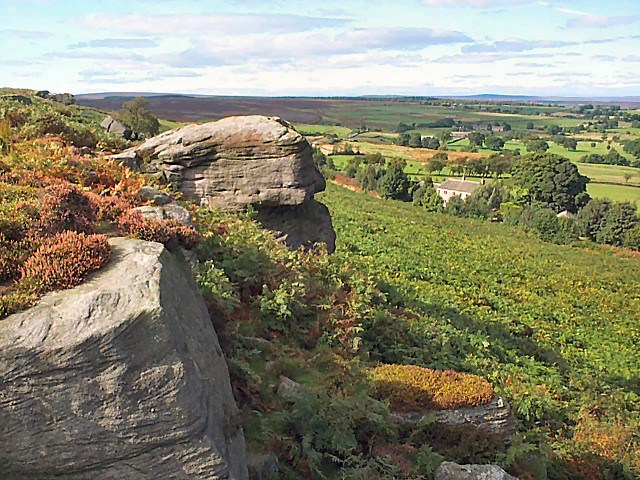
Snowden Crags

Snowden Crags is a prehistoric archaeological site on Askwith Moor in North Yorkshire, England. Local antiquarian Eric Cowling recorded a stone circle and a concentration of cairns at the location in a 1946 survey, but the site remained obscure due to the density of heather covering it for most of the year. It was rediscovered in 2010 by amateur archaeologist Paul Bennett, who described the stone circle in more detail and noted the presence of a robber trench of unknown date at its centre.

A neighbouring area of moorland, Snowden Carr, contains a large amount of prehistoric rock carvings that were also recorded by Cowling.
