= Helen Martanie Snowden =

American artist (1860–1925)

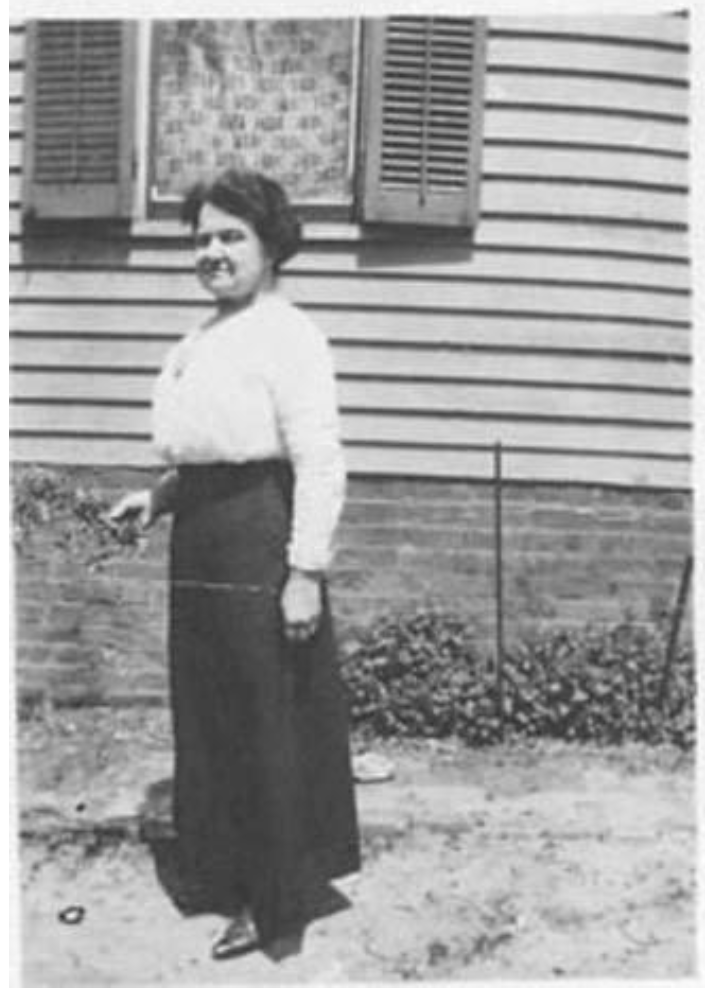
- Born: Omaha, Nebraska, US
- Education: Art Institute of New York City

Helen Martanie Snowden (1860–1925), also known as Janie, was a professional artist working in Omaha, Nebraska, in the 1890s and early twentieth century. She is known for her still life painting, including trompe-l'oeil trophy pictures. She was a member of the Western Art Association during its heyday.

== Early life ==
Helen (also known as Martanie, Janie, and Tanie) was the daughter of two of Omaha's founders and one of seven children. Her father, William Pleasant Snowden, was the first white male settler in Omaha, Nebraska. He brought his wife and three children with him and built a log house. After he had an accident to his hip, he lived with his daughter Helen.

== Career ==
Snowden studied art at the School of the Art Institute of Chicago, before moving to the Art Institute of New York City. In New York, she studied figure painting with Charles C. Curran and flower painting with Fred Finnette. She became a member of the Western Art Association in Omaha in 1891. In addition to still life, Helen painted portraits, landscapes, and worked in oil and watercolors; she also painted china.

When Snowden returned to Omaha, she set up a studio in Paxton Block, but later moved her studio into her home. She was an art instructor at Bellevue College, Nebraska, for eight years.

== Works ==
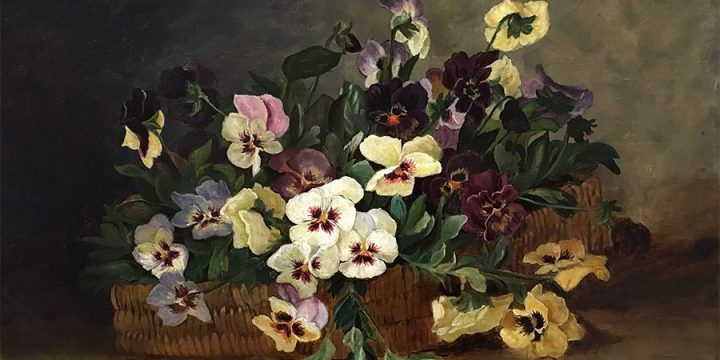
Pansies by Helen Snowden

Snowden had paintings in many local and other exhibitions.

The Museum of Nebraska Art has two of her paintings, Pansies and Grapes.

The Wyoming State Museum has held one of Snowden's artworks, a painting of a bouquet, in their collection since 1968.
