= Snowdon (Devon) =

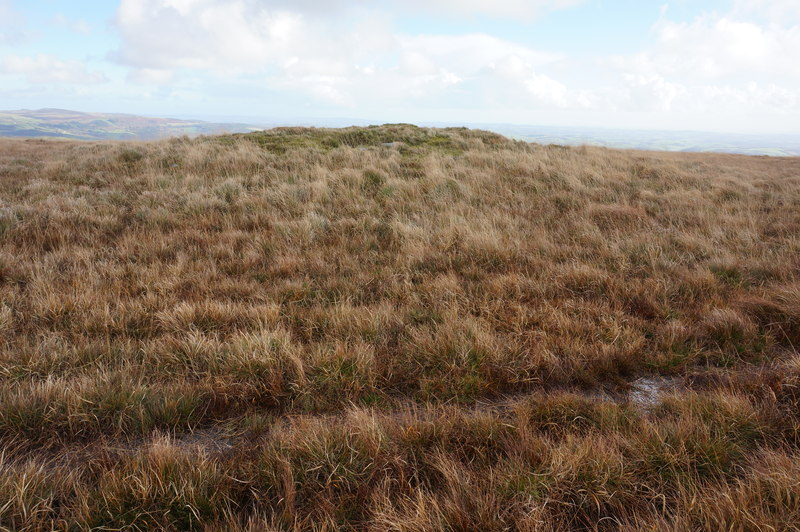

Highest point
- Elevation: 495m
- Coordinates: 50.499216°N 3.878496°W

Naming
- Etymology: snãw+dun - hill of snow

Geography
- Location: Dartmoor, UK
- OS grid: SX 66869 68287

Snowdon is a hill in Devon which at 495 m (1,624 ft) forms the second highest peak on the Southern moor of Dartmoor. The summit is the site of four Bronze Age ritual cairns, and the ground here shows evidence of being worked for peat.

On the flank of the hill lies Snowdon Hole, the remnants of the surface workings associated with the Huntingdon Tin Mine, from where the Snowdon Brook flows.
