= Minke =

Minke is a Dutch feminine given name.

== People named Minke ==
- Minke Bisschops (born 2002), Dutch sprinter
- Minke Booij (born 1977), Dutch field hockey player
- Minke Smeets (born 1979), Dutch field hockey player
