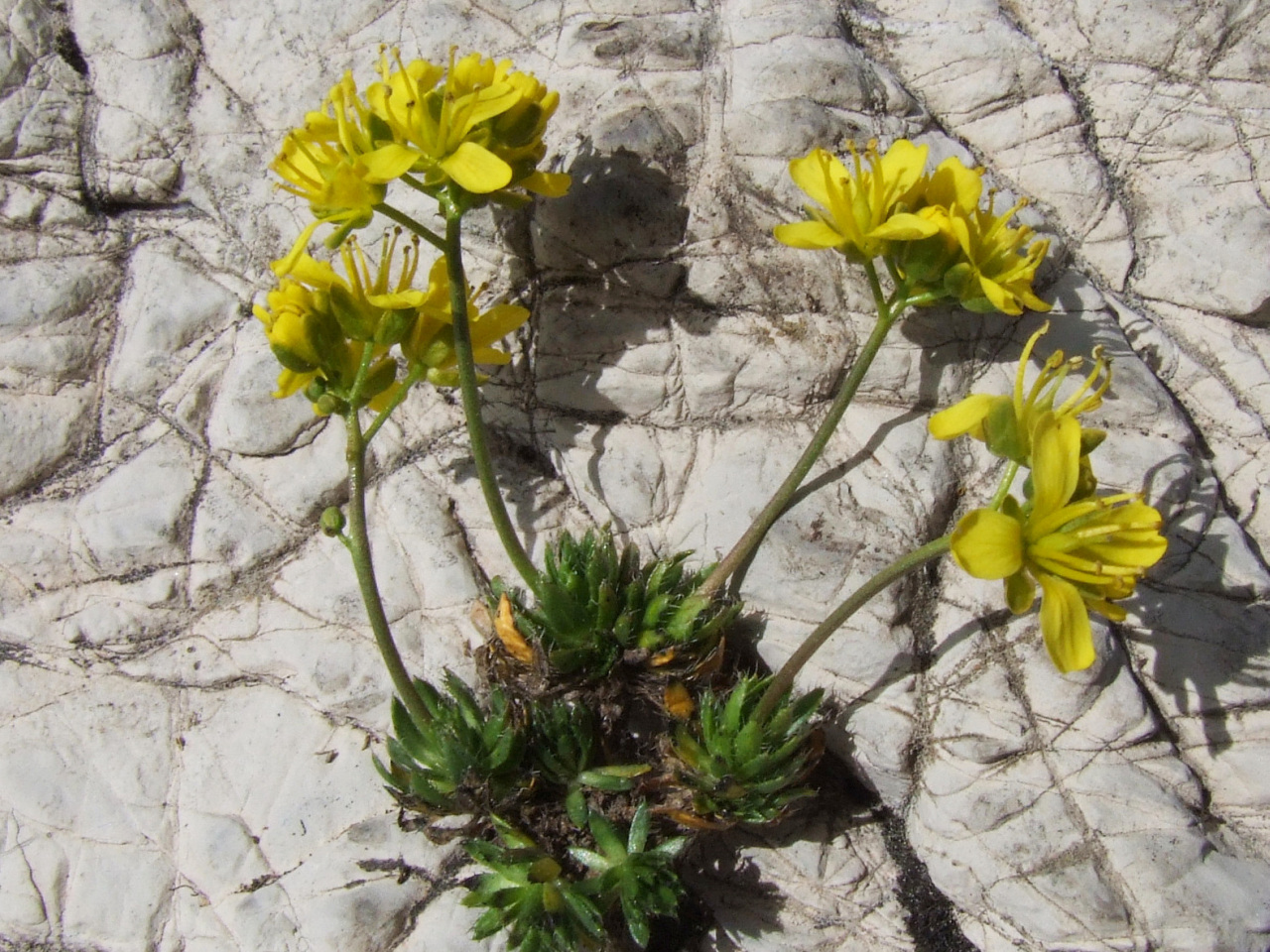

Scientific classification
- Kingdom: Plantae
- Clade: Tracheophytes
- Clade: Angiosperms
- Clade: Eudicots
- Clade: Rosids
- Order: Brassicales
- Family: Brassicaceae
- Genus: Draba
- Species: D. aizoides

Binomial name
- Draba aizoides L.

= Draba aizoides =

Species of flowering plant

Draba aizoides is a species of flowering plant in the family Brassicaceae, known as yellow whitlow-grass. It is native to Europe where it is found on limestone rocks and walls. In the British Isles it is found only on the Gower Peninsula in Wales.

== Description ==
Draba aizoides is a perennial plant, with a basal rosette of linear, stiff, entire leaves fringed with white bristles. The erect hairless and leafless stems grow to 10 centimetres (4 in), or exceptionally to 15 cm (6 in), and carry a small number of yellow flowers. These have four broad, hardly-notched petals and four hairless sepals. The seed pods are elliptical. The plant flowers in March and April in the British Isles.

== Distribution and habitat ==
Draba aizoides has a wide distribution in the mountains of southern and central Europe, from the Pyrenees in the west, through the Alps to the Carpathians. It also has a number of isolated occurrences, including the Vosges, Jura, Cévennes, Auvergne, Côte d'Or, Plateau de Langres and the Belgian Ardennes. In the British Isles, it is found only on limestone cliffs on the Gower Peninsula, from Worm's Head to Pwlldu Head. It is a lowland species and grows in pockets of soil in damp cracks and crevices in limestone rocks. When it occurs in grassland or in bare soil away from limestone rocks it seldom thrives.

== Status in Britain ==
This plant was first discovered in 1795 in the British Isles, and genetic analysis has shown that the populations in the Gower are quite distinct from those growing in continental Europe, so the plant does seem to be native to Britain. Although its total population is very small, its overall distribution has largely remained stable; plant collectors have removed some plants but the less accessible ones are persisting, although in some sites they have decreased somewhat for reasons that are not clear.
