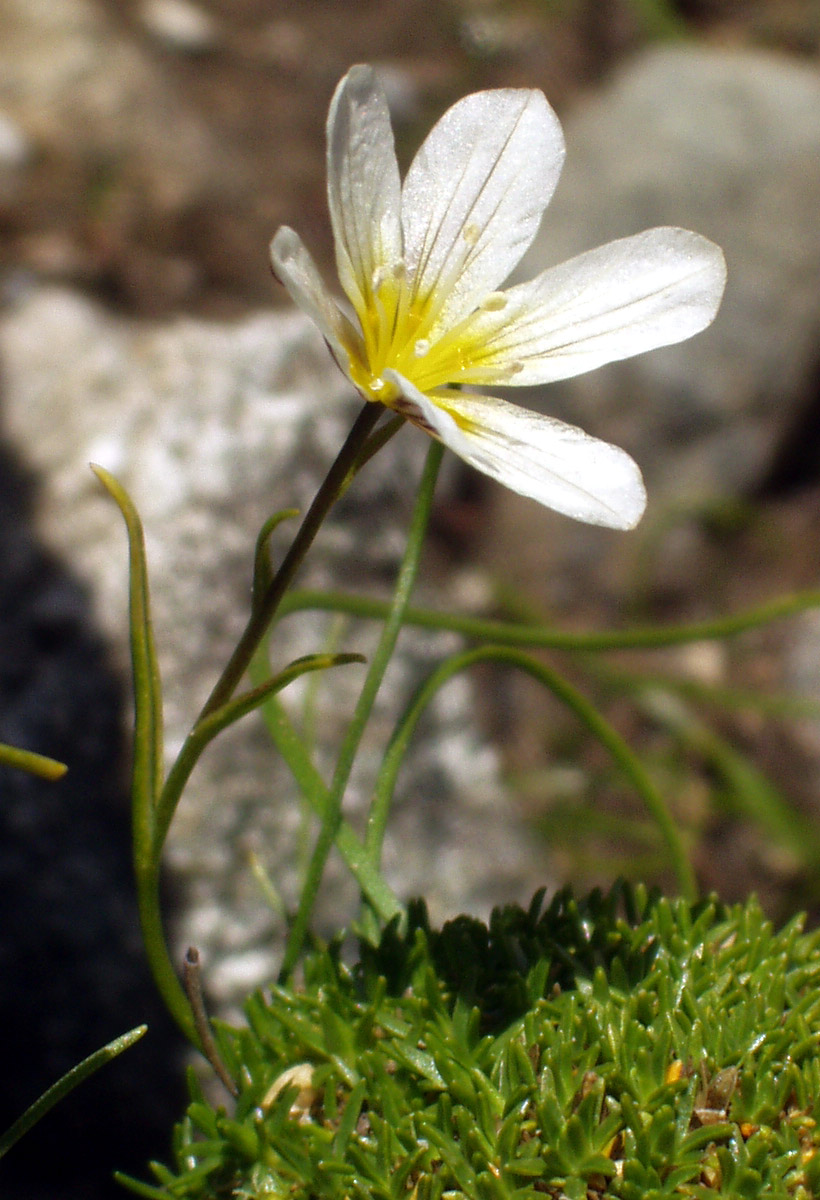

Conservation status
- Secure (NatureServe)

Scientific classification
- Kingdom: Plantae
- Clade: Tracheophytes
- Clade: Angiosperms
- Clade: Monocots
- Order: Liliales
- Family: Liliaceae
- Subfamily: Lilioideae
- Tribe: Lilieae
- Genus: Gagea
- Species: G. serotina

Binomial name
- Gagea serotina (L.) Ker Gawl.

Synonyms
- List: Anthericum serotinum (L.) L.; Ornithogalum serotinum (L.) Rchb.; Phalangium serotinum (L.) Poir.; Bulbocodium serotinum L.; Cronyxium serotinum (L.) Raf.; Lloydia serotina (L.) Rchb.; Rhabdocrinum serotinum (L.) Rchb.

= Gagea serotina =

Species of flowering plant in the lily family

Gagea serotina, synonym Lloydia serotina, is an Arctic–alpine flowering plant of the lily family. It is widespread across the mountainous parts of western North America, from Alaska to New Mexico, and in Europe is found in the Alps, the Carpathians and the mountains of Bulgaria, as well as in Great Britain. It is also native to much of Central Asia, Siberia, China, Nepal, Mongolia, Korea and Japan.

It was originally known as mountain spiderwort, but is now known in Great Britain as the Snowdon lily, or in Welsh as lili'r Wyddfa. In North America, it is called the common alplily. It is also known as Snowdon alplily.

== Description ==
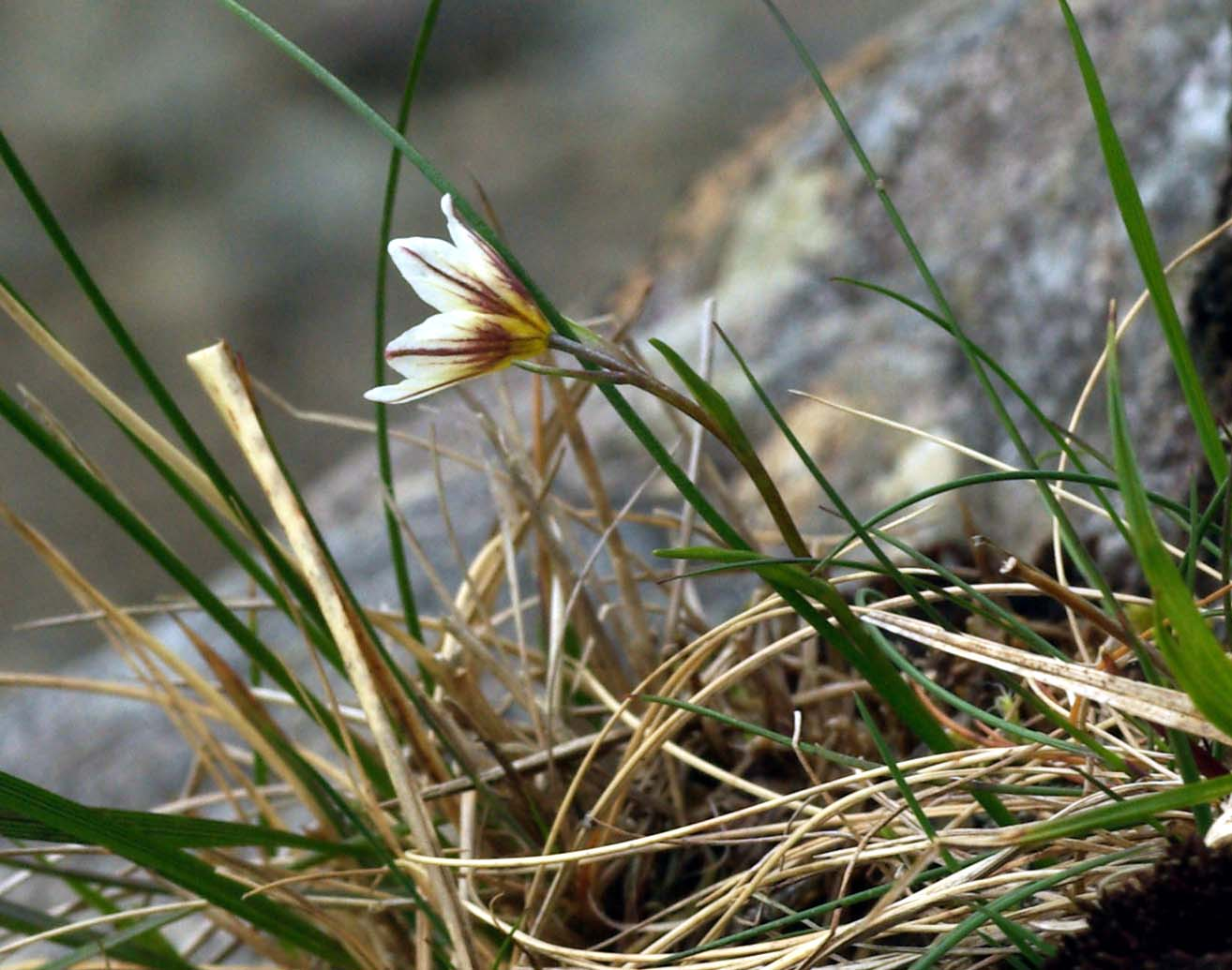
Side view of Gagea serotina flower showing purple veins

For most of the year, the plant is visible only as long, curving, stiff, grass-like leaves, often protruding through cushions of other plants. The flowers appear from June onwards (despite the name serotina, meaning "late-flowering"), and are borne at the end of long stalks. The flowers themselves are white, with purple or reddish veins along the tepals.

In Great Britain, G. serotina is an ice age relict, only found on a few inaccessible sites in Snowdonia National Park, Cwm Idwal being one such site, and seems to have developed in isolation since the glacial period. Although the total Welsh population may number fewer than 100 bulbs, the Welsh plants are genetically distinct from other populations of the same species, and are more diverse than those found in the Alps.

While their inaccessibility protects the plants to a certain degree against grazing by sheep and trampling by hikers, they are likely to suffer under climate change, and it is believed that G. serotina will be the first plant to become extinct in Britain as a result of global warming. Plans are therefore being considered to introduce the plant to sites in Scotland, where it may survive in the longer term.

It became a protected species in the UK in 1975 under the Conservation of Wild Creatures and Wild Plants Act.

== Taxonomy ==
The genus Lloydia was formerly considered distinct from Gagea, this species being called Lloydia serotina. All the species of Lloydia are now included in Gagea.
