= Rocky Valley Halt railway station =

Railway station in Llanberis, Wales, UK

Rocky Valley Halt
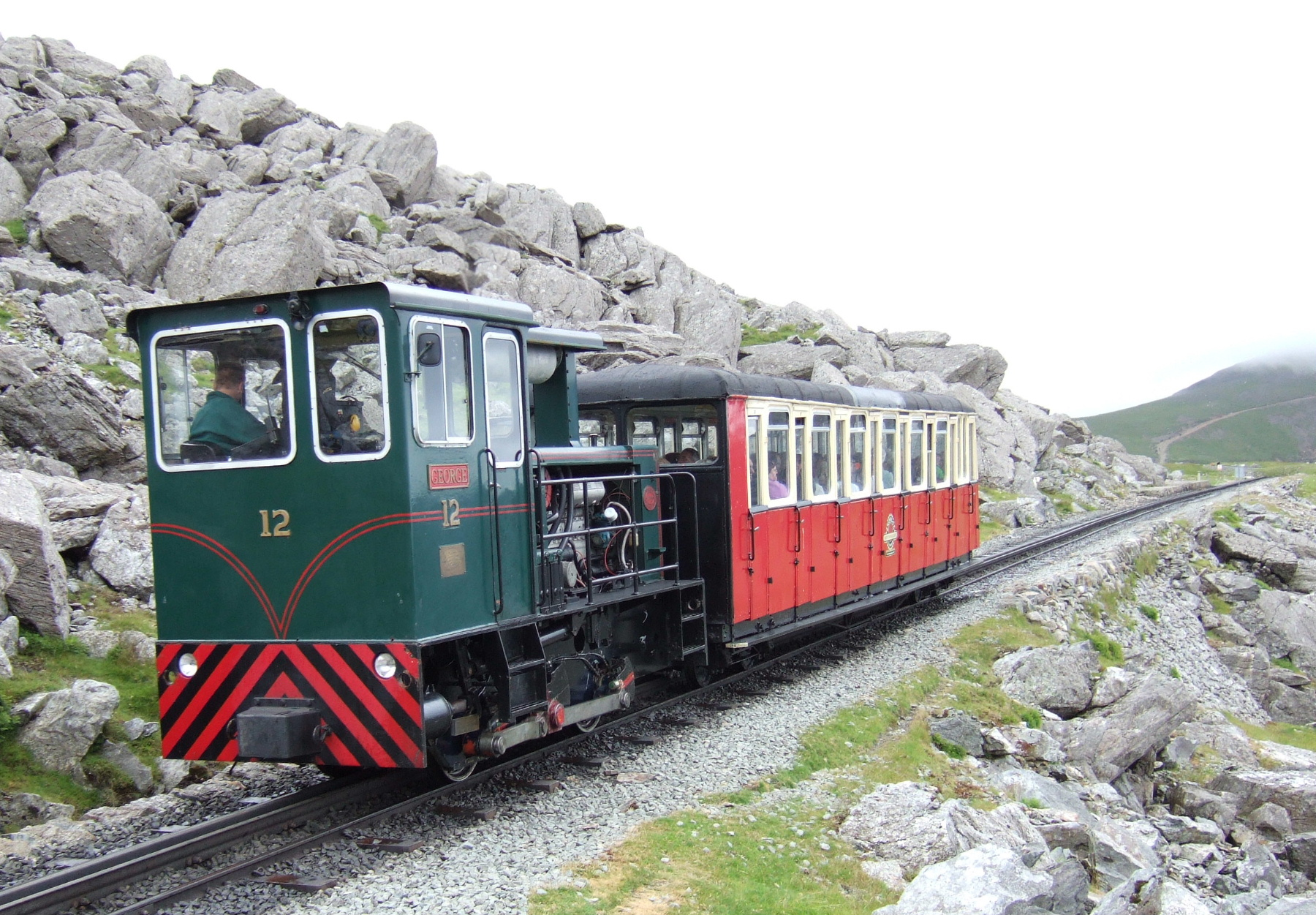
- Train climbing towards Rocky Valley Halt, with the platform a short distance in front of the train

General information
- Location: Llanberis, Gwynedd; Wales
- Coordinates: 53.0889°N 4.0838°W
- Grid reference: SH 605 566
- System: Station on heritage railway
- Platforms: 1

History
- Original company: Snowdon Mountain Railway
Location

Rocky Valley Halt is an intermediate station on the Snowdon Mountain Railway. It consists of a narrow platform sheltered by the rocky outcrop of Llechog to the east. Immediately beyond the platform the line joins the exposed ridge on which it runs for about half a mile.

The line starts in the valley bottom at Llanberis at an altitude of 353 ft (108 m), Rocky Valley Halt stands at 2,330 ft (710 m).The summit station stands at 3,493 feet (1,065 m), 68 feet (21 metres) below the summit of the mountain.

The halt is a later addition to the line, opening after the Second World War. Trains do not normally stop at the halt, but may terminate there if Clogwyn and the summit are considered too windy.

The station has one platform.

Preceding station	Heritage railways	Following station
Halfway towards Llanberis	Snowdon Mountain Railway	Clogwyn towards Summit
