= Halfway railway station =

Railway station in North Wales

Halfway
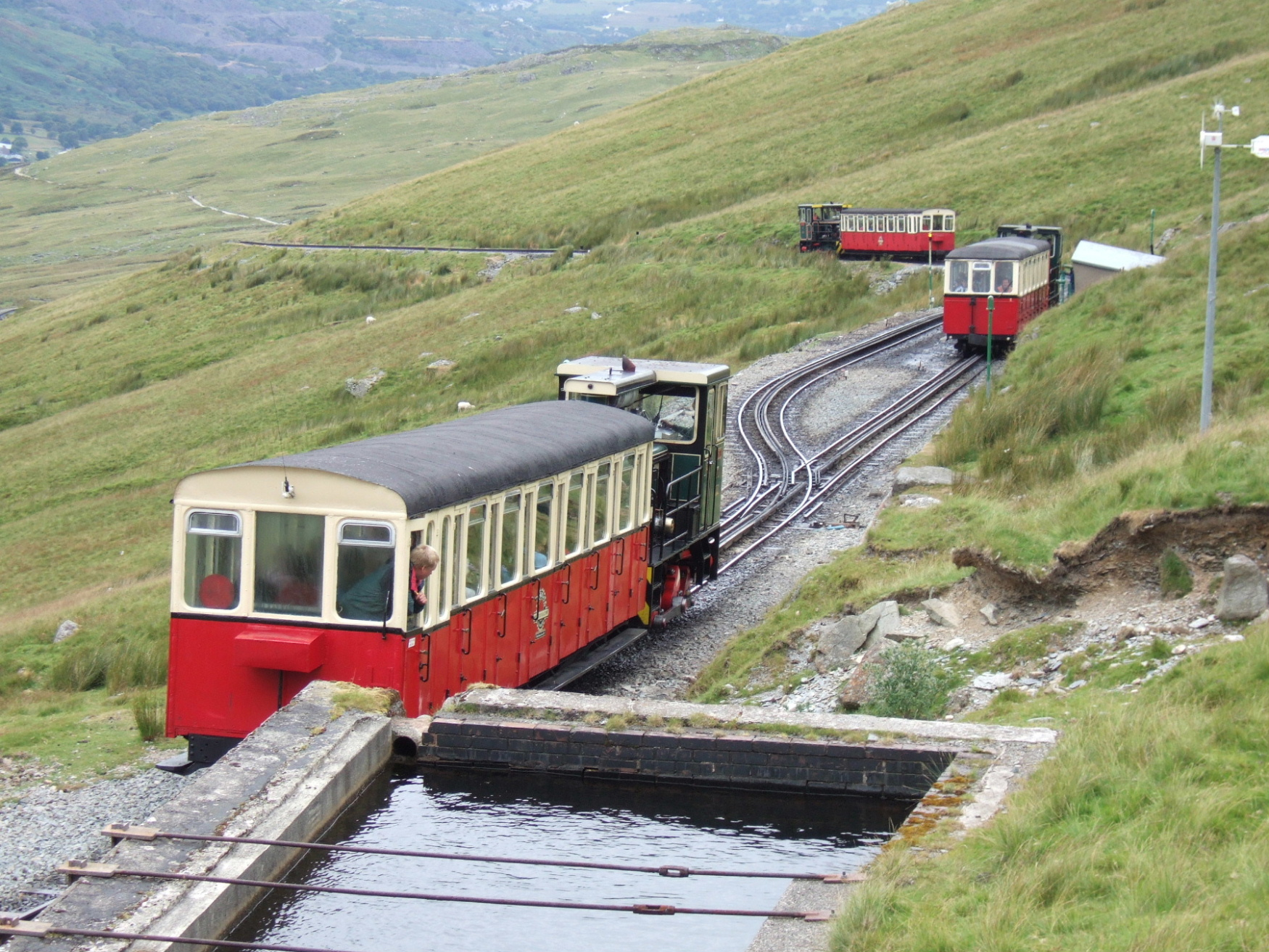

General information
- Location: Llanberis, Gwynedd; Wales
- Coordinates: 53.0954°N 4.0962°W
- Grid reference: SH 597 574
- System: Station on heritage railway
- Platforms: 1

History
- Original company: Snowdon Mountain Railway

Key dates
- 6 April 1896: Opened and closed following an accident
- 9 April 1897: Opened
Location

Halfway railway station is an intermediate stop on the Snowdon Mountain Railway, halfway along the line and close to the 'Halfway House' cafe on the nearby footpath. A short distance above the station is a path that leads down to the cafe.

The line starts in the valley bottom at Llanberis at an altitude of 353 ft (108 m), Halfway station stands at 1,641 ft (500 m). The summit station stands at 3,494 feet (1,065 m), 68 feet (21 metres) below the summit of the mountain.

The station opened with the railway on 6 April 1896, but both closed the same day following an accident. They reopened on 9 April 1897 without mishap and have operated since except during wartime.

The station has one platform.

Preceding station	Heritage railways	Following station
Hebron towards Llanberis	Snowdon Mountain Railway	Rocky Valley Halt towards Summit
