= Waterfall railway station (Snowdon Mountain Railway) =

Former railway station in Gwynedd, Wales

Waterfall (SMR)
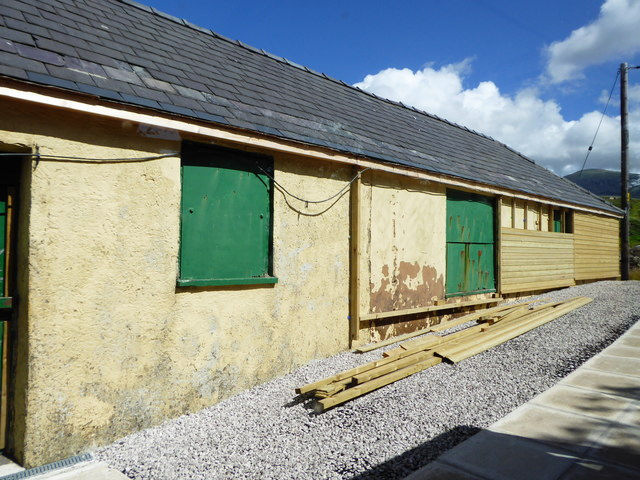
- Waterfall station building

General information
- Location: Llanberis, Gwynedd; Wales
- Coordinates: 53.1111°N 4.1267°W
- Grid reference: SH 577 592
- System: Station on heritage railway
- Platforms: 1

History
- Original company: Snowdon Mountain Railway

Key dates
- 6 April 1896: Opened and closed following an accident
- 9 April 1897: Opened
- September 1923: Closed
Location

Waterfall railway station (today also signed as Gorsaf Ceunant Mawr) was the first intermediate stop on the Snowdon Mountain Railway, located on the southern edge of Llanberis, Gwynedd, Wales.

== History ==
Waterfall railway station was built to allow visitors to use the train to travel to a spectacular waterfall close to the line. A short distance from Waterfall station is a bridge over the river and a gate, which marks the start of the mountain.

The station opened with the railway on 6 April 1896, but both closed the same day following an accident. The line as a whole did not reopen until 9 April 1897, but trains were again running to Waterfall by late September 1896. Except for wartime, the station operated until closure in September 1923. The line through the station remains operational.

== Location ==
The railway line starts in the valley bottom at Llanberis station at an altitude of 353 ft (108 m), and Waterfall station stands at 580 ft (180 m). The line subsequently rises to Summit station, which stands at 3,493 feet (1,065 m), 68 feet (21 metres) below the summit of the mountain.

== Facilities ==
The station is closed to passengers, but the station building remains in use as an engineers' base. The original station had one platform, which was demolished after closure. During the latter part of 2016 Snowdon Mountain Railway engineers constructed two new platforms at Waterfall station, one on each side of the main running line.

Preceding station	Heritage railways	Following station
Former service
Llanberis Terminus	Snowdon Mountain Railway	Hebron towards Summit
