= Clogwyn railway station =

Railway station in Gwynedd, Wales

Clogwyn
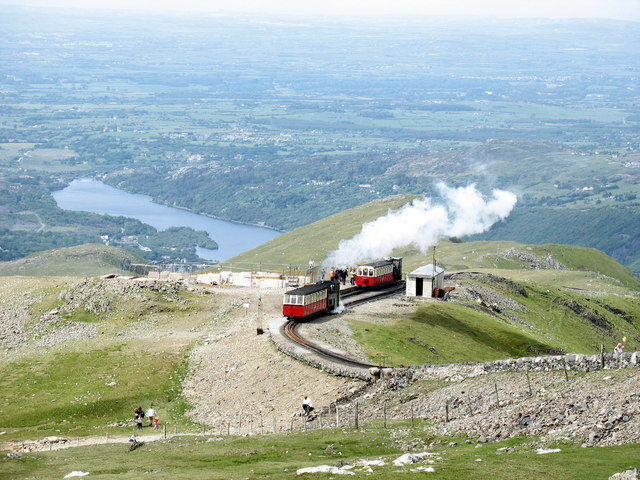
- Trains at Clogwyn

General information
- Location: Llanberis, Gwynedd; Wales
- Coordinates: 53.0841°N 4.0803°W
- Grid reference: SH 607 561
- System: Station on heritage railway
- Platforms: 1

History
- Original company: Snowdon Mountain Railway

Key dates
- 6 April 1896: Opened and closed following an accident
- 9 April 1897: Opened
Location

Clogwyn is an intermediate station on the Snowdon Mountain Railway. It is located on an exposed ridge overlooking the Llanberis Pass and Clogwyn Du'r Arddu cliffs, a popular climbing spot.

The line starts in the valley bottom at Llanberis at an altitude of 353 ft (108 m), Clogwyn station stands at 2,556 ft (779 m).The summit station stands at 3,493 feet (1,065 m), 68 feet (21 metres) below the summit of the mountain.

The station opened with the railway on 6 April 1896, but both closed the same day following an accident. They reopened on 9 April 1897 without mishap and have operated since except during wartime.

The station has one platform.

| Preceding station | Heritage railways | Following station |
|---|---|---|
| Rocky Valley Halt towards Llanberis | Snowdon Mountain Railway | Summit Terminus |
