= Hebron railway station =

Train station in Wales

Hebron
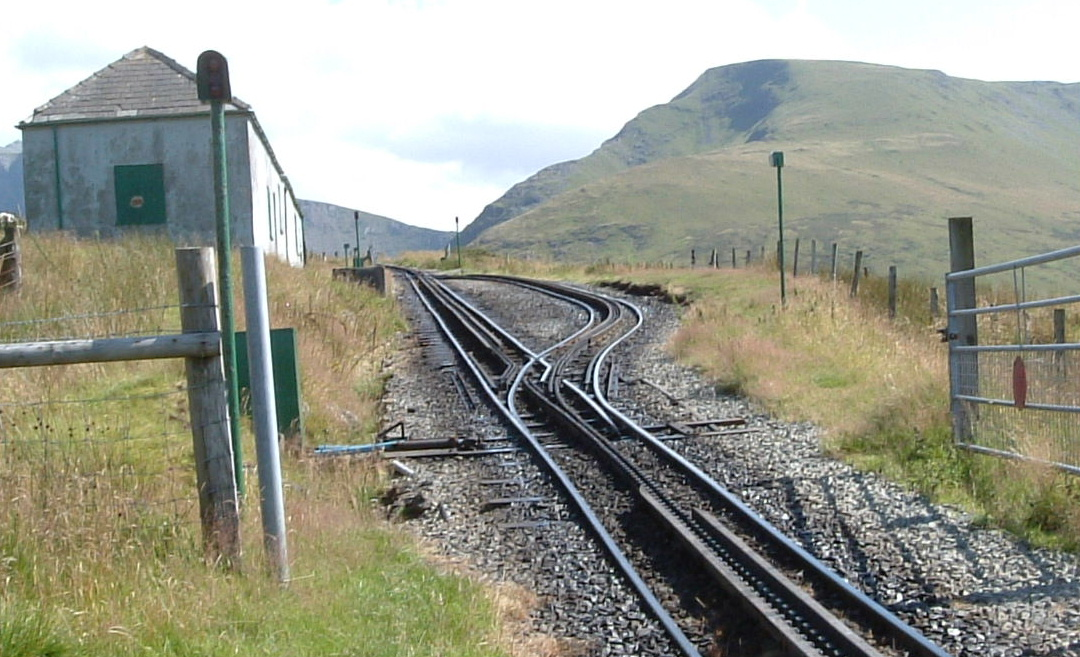

General information
- Location: Llanberis, Gwynedd; Wales
- Coordinates: 53.1045°N 4.1179°W
- Grid reference: SH 583 584
- System: Station on heritage railway
- Platforms: 1

History
- Original company: Snowdon Mountain Railway

Key dates
- 6 April 1896: Opened and closed following an accident
- 9 April 1897: Opened
Location

Hebron railway station is an intermediate passing place and former halt on the Snowdon Mountain Railway, located near a long-standing chapel on the lower slopes of Snowdon south of Llanberis, Gwynedd, Wales. It was named after a Calvinistic Methodist chapel that stood nearby, first built in 1797, which now lies in ruins.

It was originally hoped that agricultural traffic could be carried to and from this station.

The line starts in the valley bottom at Llanberis at an altitude of 353 ft (108 m), Hebron station stands at 1,069 ft (326 m).The summit station stands at 3,493 feet (1,065 m), 68 feet (21 metres) below the summit of the mountain.

The station opened with the railway on 6 April 1896, but both closed the same day following an accident. They reopened on 9 April 1897, without mishap and have operated since except during wartime.

The station has one platform.

Preceding station	Heritage railways	Following station
Llanberis Terminus	Snowdon Mountain Railway	Halfway towards Summit
Former service
Waterfall towards Llanberis	Snowdon Mountain Railway	Halfway towards Summit
