= Disneyland Railroad (Paris) =

Heritage railroad at Disneyland Paris

Coordinates: 48°52′15″N 2°46′45″E

- The attraction poster for the EDRR

Disneyland Park (Paris)
- Area: Main Street, U.S.A., Frontierland, Fantasyland, Discoveryland
- Status: Operating
- Opening date: April 12, 1992

Ride statistics
- Attraction type: Heritage railroad
- Manufacturer: Hugh Phillips Engineering
- Designer: Walt Disney Imagineering
- Length: 7,150 ft (2,180 m)
- Speed: 10 mph (16 km/h)
- Vehicle type: Train
- Vehicles: 4 steam locomotives; 20 passenger cars
- Riders per vehicle: 250 per train
- Duration: 25–30 minutes
- No. of tracks: Single
- Track gauge: 3 ft (914 mm)
- Previous name: Euro Disneyland Railroad (1992–1994)
- Must transfer from wheelchair

The Disneyland Railroad (DRR), originally the Euro Disneyland Railroad (EDRR), is a 3 ft (914 mm) narrow gauge heritage railroad in Disneyland Park in the Disneyland Paris Resort in Marne-la-Vallée, France, which was inaugurated on April 12, 1992, the park's opening day. Its route is 7,150 feet (2,180 m) in length and is used by park guests for transportation to other areas of the park, or simply for the experience of The Grand Circle Tour.

== Experience ==
Main Street Station is seen upon entering Disneyland Park, in Main Street, U.S.A.. From there, guests can start their journey around the park, with a recorded narration speaking in both French and English about visited landscapes.

Traveling in a clockwise direction, trains first cross a diorama recreation of the Grand Canyon, complete with wild animals and storm effects. This diorama also hides the show building for Phantom Manor. As they arrive in Frontierland, travelling behind the Rivers of the Far West, they first stop in Frontierland Depot.

Departing from Frontierland, trains then travel through the Adventureland section, allowing guests to discover the Temple of Peril and witnessing the inside of the ride Pirates of the Caribbean, before arriving at Fantasyland Station, located in the British part of England in the Fantasyland section (which also includes Peter Pan's Flight and Alice's Curious Labyrinth) where guests are given a whole view on the land.

Leaving Fantasyland, trains venture through the facade of It's a Small World. Finally, in the Discoveryland section, the train stops above the Star Tours - The Adventures Continue and Mickey's PhilharMagic attraction at Discoveryland Station. The journey comes to an end while returning to Main Street.

Disneyland Railroad stations

Main Street, U.S.A. Station

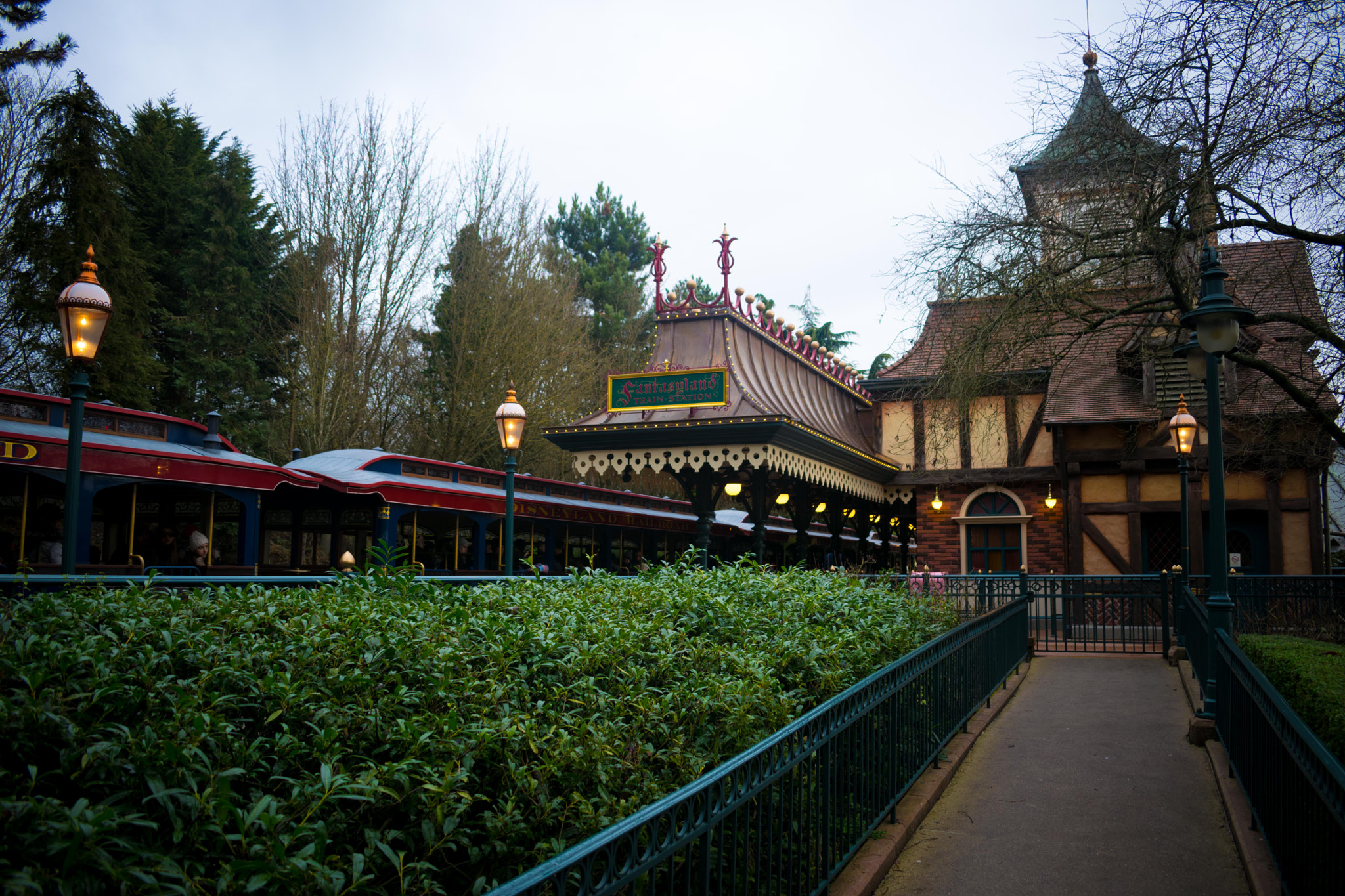
Fantasyland Station

== Rolling stock ==
The Disneyland Railroad operates four 4-4-0 steam locomotives; the first three were built by H.P. Phillips Company in 1992, and the fourth was built by Severn Lamb in 1993. These locomotives are all based on the No. 1 C.K. Holliday locomotive of the original Disneyland Railroad, and are built to essentially the same specifications, with only cosmetic differences. There are also twenty passenger cars, with five assigned to each locomotive.

Disneyland Railroad rolling stock details
Number and name	Namesake	Image	Wheel arrangement	Date built	Builder	APPAVE number	Passenger cars	Date entered service	Status	Notes
1 W.F. Cody	William Frederick Cody		4-4-0 (American)	1991-1992	H.P. Phillips Company	41037	Five yellow/green passenger cars (Nos. 11-15)	April 1992	Operational	This locomotive has the same design as its prototype, Disneyland Railroad No. 1 in Anaheim, California. Its cars were named after U.S. western cities: Silverton, Durango, Denver, Wichita, and Cheyenne.
2 C.K. Holliday	Cyrus K. Holliday		4-4-0 (American)	1991-1992	H.P. Phillips Company	41035	Five tan/red passenger cars (Nos. 21-25)	April 1992	Operational	This locomotive shares the same name as the Disneyland Railroad's No. 1 locomotive in Anaheim, California. Its cars were named after eastern U.S. resorts: Coney Island, Atlantic City, Long Island, Niagara Falls, and Chesapeake.
3 G. Washington	George Washington		4-4-0 (American)	1991-1992	H.P. Phillips Company	41036	Five blue/red passenger cars (Nos. 31-35)	April 1992	Operational	The locomotive's headlamp has the paintings of George Washington and Marquis de Lafayette on the sides. Its cars were named after places where Washington associated with famous events: Mt. Vernon, Boston, Philadelphia, Yorktown, and Valley Forge.
4 Eureka	Ancient Greek term		4-4-0 (American)	1993	Severn Lamb	41038	Five beige/red passenger cars (Nos. 41-45)	May 1993	Operational	This locomotive shares the same name and number as the Eureka Locomotive. Its cars were named after cities in California: San Francisco, Los Angeles, Monterey, San Diego and Sacramento.

== Incidents ==
On January 2, 2013 at 8:40 pm, as the DRR's No. 1 locomotive approached the Frontierland station with its train, the front car was uncoupled from the other four cars. When the locomotive stopped at Frontierland station, the three rear cars struck the front car. Forty-three guests and four employees were on the train at this time of the incident. Thirty-nine guests were immediately taken care of by park agents to exit the train safely, while the other four guests were taken to the hospital with minor injuries and were later discharged.

== See also ==
- Rail transport in Walt Disney Parks and Resorts

== Bibliography ==
- Broggie, Michael (2014), Walt Disney's Railroad Story: The Small-Scale Fascination That Led to a Full-Scale Kingdom (4th ed.), The Donning Company Publishers, ISBN 978-1-57864-914-3
