= Garnedd Ugain =

Mountain in Gwynedd, Wales

Coordinates: 53.07499°N 4.07633°W

- Garnedd Ugain (right) and Snowdon (left)

Highest point
- Elevation: 1,065 m (3,494 ft)
- Prominence: 72 m (236 ft)
- Parent peak: Snowdon
- Listing: Hewitt, Welsh 3000s, Nuttall, Furth

Naming
- English translation: Cairn of the Twenty
- Language of name: Welsh
- Pronunciation: Welsh: [ˈɡarnɛð ˈiːɡai̯n]

Geography
- Location: Gwynedd, Wales
- Parent range: Snowdonia
- OS grid: SH610551
- Topo map: OS Landranger 115

Listed summits of Garnedd Ugain
| Name | Grid ref | Height | Status |
|---|---|---|---|
| Llechog | | 718 m (2,356 ft) | sub Hewitt, Nuttall |

Garnedd Ugain, the summit of Crib-y-Ddysgl ridge, is a pyramidal mountain in Wales that forms part of the Snowdon Massif. It is the second-highest peak in Wales (although with a far greater topographical prominence Carnedd Llywelyn is usually considered second highest) and lies just under one kilometre north of the summit of Snowdon itself.

It is part of the Snowdon Horseshoe route, being linked to Crib Goch via the col at Bwlch Coch, and to Snowdon summit via the col at Bwlch Glas. It is also linked to Cwm Glas to the northeast via a steep arete called Clogwyn y Person, which joins the main Crib y Ddysgl ridge about 500 metres (1,600 feet) east of the summit.

== Name ==
Both Garnedd Ugain and Crib-y-Ddysgl appear on the Ordnance Survey's maps of the area. The name Crib-y-Ddysgl refers to the east ridge whilst the summit is Garnedd or Carnedd Ugain.

Crib-y-Ddysgl (meaning "ridge of the dish" in Welsh) is the name used by Alan Dawson for the peak's listing as a Hewitt.

Carnedd Ugain in Welsh means "Cairn of the Twenty" (the form Garnedd is the result of soft mutation). This was possibly named after the Roman legion based in Caernarfon.

The web pages of the Welsh Mountaineering Club suggest that the name could also be a corruption of "Carnedd Wgon", and so named after the prince Wgon sung of by Dafydd ap Gwilym or possibly after the 13th-century poet Gwgon Brydydd.

== Fauna and Flora ==
The slopes of Garnedd Ugain, like much of the Snowdon Massif, are dominated by alpine–arctic vegetation due to the altitude and exposure.

Common plants include heather (Calluna vulgaris), bilberry (Vaccinium myrtillus), and various mosses and lichens that cling to the rocky surfaces.

In crevices and less exposed areas, you may find ferns and hardy grasses adapted to thin, acidic soils.

The area is also noted for several rare arctic-alpine plants, relics of the last Ice Age, such as snowdon lily (Gagea serotina), which is one of the rarest plants in the UK and almost exclusively found in Snowdonia.

Birdlife is significant: species such as peregrine falcons (Falco peregrinus), ravens (Corvus corax), and choughs (Pyrrhocorax pyrrhocorax) nest among the cliffs.

Small mammals include voles, shrews, and occasionally stoats.

Insects are diverse in summer, with butterflies like the small heath (Coenonympha pamphilus) and a variety of moths and beetles that thrive in heathland vegetation.

Grazing by sheep is very common and has shaped much of the upland ecology.

Amphibians such as the common frog (Rana temporaria) and reptiles like the common lizard (Zootoca vivipara) can be found in the lower, wetter slopes.
