= Heritage Great Britain PLC =

Attractions company that operates numerous sites in the UK

Heritage Great Britain PLC is an attractions company that operates numerous sites in the UK. The company used to own and operate Lightwater Valley.

Founded in 1999, Heritage Great Britain operates landmark destinations and visitor attractions in the UK. The company is headquartered in Liverpool.

The company is an unlisted public company owned by Jersey based Cherberry ltd.

== List of attractions ==
=== Current ===
- John O'Groats
- Land's End
- The Needles Landmark Attraction
- Snowdon Mountain Railway

=== Former ===
- Lightwater Valley (Managed by Heritage Great Britain, owned by Ball Investments. Sold to Livingstone Leisure in 2017)
