= Hugh Phillips Engineering =

Hugh Phillips Engineering of Tredegar, Wales, were specialists in the manufacture of steam locomotive valves and controls.

In 1982 they were involved with refurbishment of the Great Western Railway heavy goods steam locomotive No. 2857; reboring the cylinders and valves for the engine.

In 1985-1986 they restored six of the Sudan Railways 2-8-2 for grain haulage.

In 1989 they built three diesel railcars for Sudan, and one for Mozambique. In 1991 they built three 3 ft (914 mm) gauge 4-4-0 steam locomotives and fifteen carriages for the railroad at Euro Disney. In 1992 a railcar was built for Irish Railways.

In 1992 the company went into receivership, but was resurrected as HPE Tredegar Ltd (company number 02715632) who continued in the same business, building railcars for Ghana and Tanzania. In 1995 they built three diesel electric rack railcars for the Snowdon Mountain Railway; the company was forced into receivership in 1996.
