= Ray Hole Architects =

British architectural firm

Ray Hole Architects is an English architectural practice, based in Arundel, specialising in cultural and leisure-based projects. Their work includes:

- the VW and Bentley Pavilions at Autostadt
- Ripley's Believe It or Not! Museum (2008) at the London Pavilion, Piccadilly Circus
- Hafod Eryri, the new £8.4M Snowdon summit building (2009)
- the new Seaton tram station
- buildings at Marwell Wildlife.
- masterplanning for the Hurghada Cultural Leisure Centre in Egypt

The VW Pavilion at Autostadt won an FX International Design and Architecture Award). Hafod Eryri won the National Eisteddfod of Wales Gold Medal for Architecture in 2009.
