= Llechog =

Mountain peak in Wales

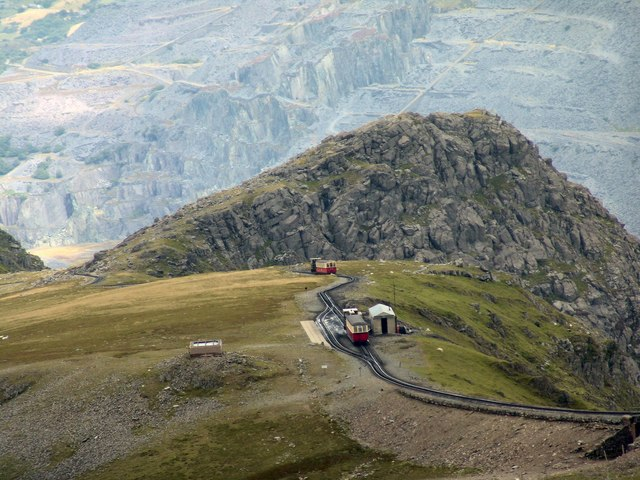
- Llechog from Garnedd Ugain, with Clogwyn Station in front

Highest point
- Elevation: 720 m (2,360 ft)
- Prominence: 28 m (92 ft)
- Parent peak: Snowdon
- Listing: sub Hewitt, Nuttall
- Coordinates: 53.07499°N 4.07633°W

Naming
- English translation: slaty, rocky, stony
- Language of name: Welsh

Geography
- Location within Wales
- Location: Gwynedd, Wales
- Parent range: Snowdonia
- OS grid: SH610551
- Topo map: OS Landranger 115

Llechog is a top of Garnedd Ugain on the Snowdon massif in Wales. It is the top of a long crest of cliffs that start in Llanberis and finishes on Garnedd Ugain. The nearby Clogwyn Station is a stop of the Snowdon mountain railway. The summit is a rocky peak sitting out from cliffs which fall steeply down to the Nant Peris valley. The viewpoint is commanding, where the full prominence of Glyder Fawr, Y Garn, Elidir Fawr and Crib Goch can be admired.

A second top of the same name can also be found about 1/2 mile to the south-west of Snowdon summit, overlooking Cwm Clogwyn.
