= Llanberis railway station (Snowdon Mountain Railway) =

Railway station in Llanb, Wales, UK

Llanberis (SMR)
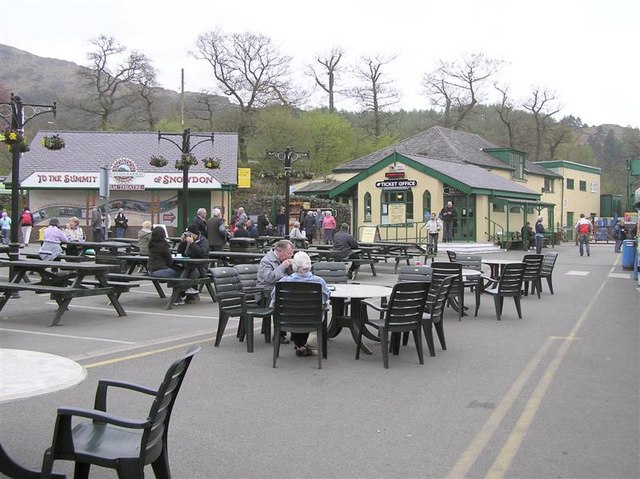

General information
- Location: Llanberis, Gwynedd; Wales
- Coordinates: 53.1163°N 4.1195°W
- Grid reference: SH 582 597
- System: Station on heritage railway
- Platforms: 2

History
- Original company: Snowdon Mountain Railway

Key dates
- 6 April 1896: Opened and closed following an accident
- 9 April 1897: Opened
Route map
Location

Llanberis (SMR) railway station is the lower terminus of the Snowdon Mountain Railway, located in Llanberis, Gwynedd, Wales.

The station houses the headquarters of the tourist railway which climbs for 4.7 miles (7.6 km) from Llanberis to the summit of Snowdon, the highest peak in Wales. The station stands in the valley bottom at an altitude of (353 ft (108 m)), the summit station stands at 3,493 feet (1,065 m), 68 feet (21 metres) below the summit of the mountain.

The station opened with the railway on 6 April 1896, but closed the same day following an accident. It reopened on 9 April 1897, without mishap and has operated since, even throughout most of the Second World War, as there was military activity near the mountaintop.

The station has two platforms. The first stretch of line is uphill at 1 in 50, steep for a main line but shallow compared with the 1 in 6 incline that begins shortly afterwards. The line's engine shed and workshop are visible from the platform ends.

Preceding station	Heritage railways	Following station
Terminus	Snowdon Mountain Railway	Hebron towards Summit
Change for the Llanberis Lake Railway at Llanberis (LLR), on the other side of the A4086 road
Former service
Terminus	Snowdon Mountain Railway	Waterfall towards Summit
