= Summit railway station (Snowdon Mountain Railway) =

Railway station in Wales

Summit Welsh: Y Copa

General information
- Location: Llanberis, Gwynedd; Wales
- Coordinates: 53.0680°N 4.0783°W
- Grid reference: SH 609 543
- System: Station on heritage railway
- Platforms: 2

History
- Original company: Snowdon Mountain Railway

Key dates
- 6 April 1896: Opened and closed following an accident
- 9 April 1897: Opened
- 2006: Closed for rebuilding
- 12 June 2009: Reopened
Location

The Summit railway station is the southern, upper terminus of the Snowdon Mountain Railway, located within yards of the summit of Snowdon. In 2009 a new station building was opened, which was named Hafod Eryri.

The line starts in the valley bottom at Llanberis at an altitude of 353 ft (108 m). Summit station stands at 3,493 feet (1,065 m), 67 feet (20 metres) below the summit of the mountain, to which it is connected by a short stepped path. There is a café at the top.

== History ==
The first buildings on the summit predate the railway, and were erected at the Snowdon summit in 1838 to sell refreshments, and a licence to sell intoxicating liquor was granted in 1845. Very basic accommodation was also provided for visitors.

The station opened with the railway on 6 April 1896, but both closed the same day following an accident. They reopened a year later, on 9 April 1897. After the station opened, the company strove to get an alcohol licence for its own proposed new hotel, but being unable to, took over both summit huts by 1898.

During the 1930s, many complaints were received about the state of the facilities at the summit and in 1934/5 a new station building was erected in two phases; the upstairs accommodation was completed in 1937. It was designed by Sir Clough Williams-Ellis and included rooms for visitors and a cafe. The other operators were bought out and the ramshackle collection of buildings on the summit was cleared. The flat roof was intended to be used as a viewing platform and some photographs show it being used in this way. However, other photographs taken of the cafe show that the roof leaked, which probably explains why the practice was stopped. The Summit was taken over by government agencies during the war and the accommodation was restricted to staff use afterwards. Having become increasingly dilapidated in post-war decades, this building was described by Prince Charles as "the highest slum in Wales". Its state led to a campaign to replace the building. In April 2006, Snowdonia National Park Authority with the support of the Snowdonia Society agreed a deal to start work on a new cafe and visitor centre complex. By mid-October 2006 the old building had been largely demolished.

The 1930s station operated until 2006 except during World War II. In September 2006 the station and associated buildings were demolished for complete rebuilding, passenger services terminating at Clogwyn until the new visitor centre of Hafod Eryri and station were opened by Welsh First Minister Rhodri Morgan on 12 June 2009.

== The new station ==
Hafod Eryri
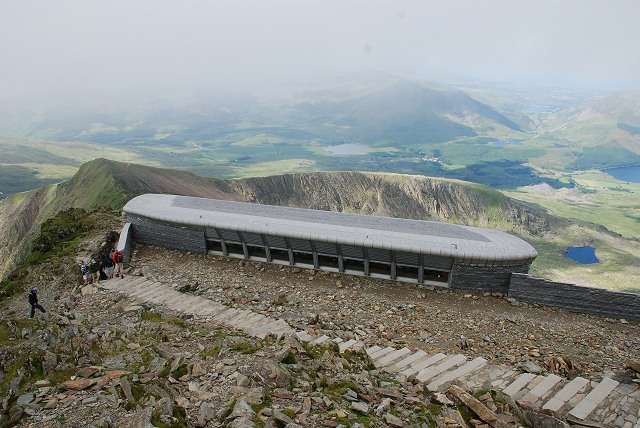
- Hafod Eryri (2009)
- Interactive map of the Hafod Eryri area

General information
- Location: via Snowdon Mountain Railway, Llanberis, Caernarfon, Gwynedd, LL55 4TY
- Coordinates: 53.068865°N 4.075588°W
- Elevation: 1,065 m (3,494 ft)
- Opened: 12 June 2009
- Cost: £8.4m

Design and construction
- Architecture firm: Ray Hole Architects
- Structural engineer: Arup
- Main contractor: Carillion
- Awards: RIBA Welsh Architecture Award 2010

Website
- Hafod Eryri Visitor Centre

The new RIBA Award-winning £8.4 million visitor centre, Hafod Eryri, designed by Ray Hole Architects in conjunction with Arup and built by Carillion, was officially opened on 12 June 2009 by First Minister Rhodri Morgan. The Welsh National Poet, Gwyn Thomas, composed a new couplet for the new building, displayed at its entrance and on the windows, which reads "Copa'r Wyddfa: yr ydych chwi, yma, Yn nes at y nefoedd / The summit of Snowdon: You are, here, nearer to Heaven". The name Hafod Eryri was chosen from several hundred put forward after a competition was held by the BBC. Hafod is Welsh for an upland summer residence, while Eryri is the Welsh name for Snowdonia.

== Operation ==
The station has two platforms.

Preceding station	Heritage railways	Following station
Clogwyn towards Llanberis	Snowdon Mountain Railway	Terminus
