= List of United Kingdom locations: Wd-West End =

The United Kingdom

This is part of the list of United Kingdom locations: a gazetteer of place names in the United Kingdom showing each place's locality and geographical coordinates.

== Wd ==
Location	Locality	Coordinates (links to map & photo sources)	OS grid reference
Wdig	Pembrokeshire	52.00°N 05.00°W	SM9438

== We ==
=== Wea-Wen ===
Location	Locality	Coordinates (links to map & photo sources)	OS grid reference
Weacombe	Somerset	51.15°N 03.27°W	ST1140
Weald	Oxfordshire	51.71°N 01.56°W	SP3002
Wealdstone	Harrow	51.58°N 00.34°W	TQ1589
Wearde	Cornwall	50.40°N 04.22°W	SX4258
Weardley	Leeds	53.89°N 01.56°W	SE2944
Weare	Somerset	51.26°N 02.84°W	ST4152
Weare Giffard	Devon	50.96°N 04.18°W	SS4721
Wearhead	Durham	54.74°N 02.23°W	NY8539
Wearne	Somerset	51.04°N 02.82°W	ST4228
Weasdale	Cumbria	54.42°N 02.47°W	NY6903
Weasenham All Saints	Norfolk	52.75°N 00.72°E	TF8421
Weasenham St Peter	Norfolk	52.76°N 00.74°E	TF8522
Weaste	Salford	53.47°N 02.30°W	SJ8098
Weatherhill	Surrey	51.17°N 00.12°W	TQ3143
Weatheroak Hill	Worcestershire	52.36°N 01.92°W	SP0574
Weaverham	Cheshire	53.26°N 02.58°W	SJ6174
Weavering Street	Kent	51.27°N 00.55°E	TQ7856
Weaverslake	Staffordshire	52.76°N 01.80°W	SK1319
Weaverthorpe	North Yorkshire	54.11°N 00.53°W	SE9670
Webbington	Somerset	51.29°N 02.89°W	ST3855
Webheath	Worcestershire	52.29°N 01.98°W	SP0166
Webscott	Shropshire	52.79°N 02.78°W	SJ4722
Wecock	Hampshire	50.89°N 01.03°W	SU6811
Wedder Holm	Shetland Islands	60.65°N 00.88°W	HU613974
Wedderlairs	Aberdeenshire	57.37°N 02.25°W	NJ8532
Weddington	Warwickshire	52.52°N 01.47°W	SP3692
Weddington	Kent	51.28°N 01.28°E	TR2959
Wedhampton	Wiltshire	51.31°N 01.91°W	SU0657
Wedmore	Somerset	51.21°N 02.81°W	ST4347
Wednesbury	Sandwell	52.55°N 02.03°W	SO9895
Wednesbury Oak	Sandwell	52.54°N 02.06°W	SO9694
Wednesfield	Wolverhampton	52.59°N 02.09°W	SJ9400
Weecar	Nottinghamshire	53.18°N 00.77°W	SK8266
Weedon	Buckinghamshire	51.85°N 00.82°W	SP8118
Weedon Bec	Northamptonshire	52.22°N 01.09°W	SP6259
Weedon Lois	Northamptonshire	52.11°N 01.12°W	SP6047
Weeford	Staffordshire	52.62°N 01.79°W	SK1403
Week (Chulmleigh)	Devon	50.937°N 03.805°W	SS7316
Week (Dartington)	Devon	50.44°N 03.71°W	SX7862
Week (Tawstock)	Devon	51.02°N 04.05°W	SS5627
Week (Milton Abbot)	Devon	50.60°N 04.19°W	SX4581
Weeke	Hampshire	51.06°N 01.34°W	SU4630
Weeke	Devon	50.84°N 03.76°W	SS7606
Week Green	Cornwall	50.74°N 04.51°W	SX2397
Weekley	Northamptonshire	52.41°N 00.70°W	SP8880
Weekmoor	Somerset	51.01°N 03.24°W	ST1325
Weeks	Isle of Wight	50.71°N 01.16°W	SZ5991
Week St Mary	Cornwall	50.74°N 04.51°W	SX2397
Weel	East Riding of Yorkshire	53.83°N 00.39°W	TA0639
Weeley	Essex	51.85°N 01.10°E	TM1422
Weeley Heath	Essex	51.83°N 01.11°E	TM1520
Weelsby	North East Lincolnshire	53.55°N 00.06°W	TA2808
Weem	Perth and Kinross	56.61°N 03.89°W	NN8449
Weeping Cross	Staffordshire	52.78°N 02.09°W	SJ9421
Weethley	Warwickshire	52.19°N 01.92°W	SP0555
Weethley Bank	Warwickshire	52.18°N 01.92°W	SP0554
Weethley Gate	Warwickshire	52.18°N 01.92°W	SP0554
Weeting	Norfolk	52.47°N 00.60°E	TL7789
Weeton	East Riding of Yorkshire	53.66°N 00.05°E	TA3520
Weeton	Lancashire	53.79°N 02.94°W	SD3834
Weeton	Leeds	53.90°N 01.57°W	SE2846
Weetwood	Leeds	53.82°N 01.59°W	SE2737
Weetwood Common	Cheshire	53.18°N 02.71°W	SJ5266
Weir	Essex	51.57°N 00.59°E	TQ8089
Weirbrook	Shropshire	52.80°N 02.98°W	SJ3424
Weir Quay	Devon	50.46°N 04.21°W	SX4365
Weisdale	Shetland Islands	60.26°N 01.29°W	HU3953
Welborne	Norfolk	52.63°N 01.04°E	TG0609
Welborne Common	Norfolk	52.64°N 01.02°E	TG0509
Welbourn	Lincolnshire	53.07°N 00.56°W	SK9654
Welburn (Kirkbymoorside)	North Yorkshire	54.24°N 00.95°W	SE6884
Welburn (Welburn-on-Derwent, near Malton)	North Yorkshire	54.09°N 00.90°W	SE7267
Welbury	North Yorkshire	54.41°N 01.40°W	NZ3902
Welby	Lincolnshire	52.93°N 00.55°W	SK9738
Welcombe	Devon	50.93°N 04.53°W	SS2218
Weld Bank	Lancashire	53.63°N 02.63°W	SD5816
Weldon	Northamptonshire	52.49°N 00.64°W	SP9289
Weldon	Northumberland	55.27°N 01.79°W	NZ1398
Welford	Northamptonshire	52.41°N 01.06°W	SP6480
Welford	Berkshire	51.45°N 01.42°W	SU4073
Welford-on-Avon	Warwickshire	52.15°N 01.79°W	SP1451
Welham	Somerset	51.07°N 02.48°W	ST6631
Welham	Leicestershire	52.52°N 00.88°W	SP7692
Welham	Nottinghamshire	53.33°N 00.92°W	SK7282
Welhambridge	East Riding of Yorkshire	53.79°N 00.80°W	SE7934
Welham Green	Hertfordshire	51.73°N 00.22°W	TL2305
Well	Hampshire	51.20°N 00.91°W	SU7646
Well	North Yorkshire	54.22°N 01.60°W	SE2681
Well	Lincolnshire	53.23°N 00.15°E	TF4473
Welland	Worcestershire	52.04°N 02.30°W	SO7939
Welland Stone	Worcestershire	52.04°N 02.27°W	SO8138
Wellbank	Angus	56.51°N 02.86°W	NO4736
Well Bottom	Dorset	50.94°N 02.12°W	ST9116
Wellbrook	East Sussex	51.01°N 00.23°E	TQ5726
Welldale	Dumfries and Galloway	54.98°N 03.28°W	NY1866
Well End	Hertfordshire	51.66°N 00.26°W	TQ2098
Well End	Buckinghamshire	51.58°N 00.73°W	SU8888
Weller's Town	Kent	51.17°N 00.14°E	TQ5044
Wellesbourne	Warwickshire	52.19°N 01.60°W	SP2755
Well Green	Trafford	53.37°N 02.33°W	SJ7886
Well Heads	Bradford	53.79°N 01.88°W	SE0833
Well Hall	Greenwich	51.457°N 0.050°E	TQ425751
Well Hill	Kent	51.3544°N 0.1480°E	TQ495639
Wellhouse	Berkshire	51.44°N 01.25°W	SU5272
Wellhouse	Kirklees	53.62°N 01.86°W	SE0914
Welling	Bexley	51.45°N 00.10°E	TQ4675
Wellingborough	Northamptonshire	52.29°N 00.69°W	SP8967
Wellingham	Norfolk	52.76°N 00.77°E	TF8722
Wellingore	Lincolnshire	53.09°N 00.53°W	SK9856
Wellington	Somerset	50.97°N 03.22°W	ST1420
Wellington	Herefordshire	52.12°N 02.74°W	SO4948
Wellington	Cumbria	54.42°N 03.43°W	NY0704
Wellington	Shropshire	52.69°N 02.53°W	SJ6411
Wellington Heath	Herefordshire	52.05°N 02.42°W	SO7140
Wellington Hill	Leeds	53.83°N 01.46°W	SE3538
Wellisford	Somerset	50.98°N 03.29°W	ST0921
Wellow	Isle of Wight	50.69°N 01.46°W	SZ3888
Wellow	Bath and North East Somerset	51.32°N 02.38°W	ST7358
Wellow	North East Lincolnshire	53.55°N 00.09°W	TA2608
Wellow	Nottinghamshire	53.18°N 00.99°W	SK6766
Wellow Wood	Hampshire	50.98°N 01.58°W	SU2921
Well Place	Oxfordshire	51.56°N 01.06°W	SU6585
Wellpond Green	Hertfordshire	51.87°N 00.04°E	TL4121
Wellroyd	Leeds	53.82°N 01.68°W	SE2137
Wells	Somerset	51.20°N 02.65°W	ST5445
Wellsborough	Leicestershire	52.61°N 01.46°W	SK3602
Wells Green	Cheshire	53.07°N 02.47°W	SJ6853
Wells-Next-The-Sea	Norfolk	52.95°N 00.84°E	TF9143
Wellsprings	Somerset	51.02°N 03.11°W	ST2226
Well Street	Kent	51.27°N 00.42°E	TQ6956
Wellstye Green	Essex	51.83°N 00.37°E	TL6418
Wellswood	Devon	50.46°N 03.52°W	SX9264
Well Town	Devon	50.87°N 03.56°W	SS9009
Welltown	Cornwall	50.47°N 04.63°W	SX1367
Wellwood	Fife	56.08°N 03.46°W	NT0989
Welney	Norfolk	52.52°N 00.23°E	TL5294
Welsford	Devon	50.96°N 04.46°W	SS2721
Welshampton	Shropshire	52.90°N 02.84°W	SJ4334
Welsh Bicknor	Herefordshire	51.85°N 02.59°W	SO5917
Welsh End	Shropshire	52.91°N 02.73°W	SJ5135
Welsh Frankton	Shropshire	52.88°N 02.95°W	SJ3632
Welsh Harp	Brent	51.56°N 00.25°W	TQ2186
Welsh Hook	Pembrokeshire	51.90°N 05.01°W	SM9327
Welsh Newton	Herefordshire	51.84°N 02.72°W	SO5017
Welsh Newton Common	Herefordshire	51.84°N 02.71°W	SO5117
Welshpool (Y Trallwng)	Powys	52.65°N 03.15°W	SJ2207
Welsh St Donats	The Vale Of Glamorgan	51.47°N 03.41°W	ST0276
Welshwood Park	Essex	51.89°N 00.93°E	TM0226
Welstor	Devon	50.54°N 03.77°W	SX7473
Welton	Northamptonshire	52.28°N 01.15°W	SP5866
Welton	Bath and North East Somerset	51.28°N 02.47°W	ST6754
Welton	East Ayrshire	55.51°N 04.37°W	NS5027
Welton	Cumbria	54.78°N 03.01°W	NY3544
Welton	East Riding of Yorkshire	53.73°N 00.54°W	SE9627
Welton	Lincolnshire	53.29°N 00.48°W	TF0179
Welton Hill	Lincolnshire	53.31°N 00.44°W	TF0481
Welton le Marsh	Lincolnshire	53.18°N 00.19°E	TF4768
Welton le Wold	Lincolnshire	53.36°N 00.09°W	TF2787
Welwick	East Riding of Yorkshire	53.66°N 00.02°E	TA3421
Welwyn	Hertfordshire	51.82°N 00.23°W	TL2216
Welwyn Garden City	Hertfordshire	51.80°N 00.20°W	TL2413
Wem	Shropshire	52.85°N 02.72°W	SJ5129
Wembdon	Somerset	51.12°N 03.03°W	ST2837
Wembley	Brent	51.55°N 00.31°W	TQ1785
Wembley Park	Brent	51.56°N 00.28°W	TQ1986
Wembury	Devon	50.31°N 04.08°W	SX5248
Wembworthy	Devon	50.86°N 03.90°W	SS6609
Wemyss Bay	Inverclyde	55.88°N 04.89°W	NS1969
Wenallt	Ceredigion	52.32°N 03.95°W	SN6771
Wenallt	Gwynedd	52.73°N 03.88°W	SH7317
Wendens Ambo	Essex	52.00°N 00.19°E	TL5136
Wendlebury	Oxfordshire	51.86°N 01.18°W	SP5619
Wendling	Norfolk	52.68°N 00.85°E	TF9313
Wendover	Buckinghamshire	51.76°N 00.75°W	SP8608
Wendover Dean	Buckinghamshire	51.72°N 00.74°W	SP8704
Wendron	Cornwall	50.13°N 05.26°W	SW6731
Wendy	Cambridgeshire	52.10°N 00.07°W	TL3247
Wenfordbridge	Cornwall	50.54°N 04.71°W	SX0875
Wenhaston	Suffolk	52.32°N 01.54°E	TM4275
Wenhaston Black Heath	Suffolk	52.31°N 01.53°E	TM4174
Wennington	Cambridgeshire	52.39°N 00.19°W	TL2379
Wennington	Havering	51.49°N 00.21°E	TQ5480
Wennington	Lancashire	54.12°N 02.59°W	SD6170
Wensley	North Yorkshire	54.29°N 01.86°W	SE0989
Wensley	Derbyshire	53.14°N 01.61°W	SK2661
Wentbridge	Wakefield	53.64°N 01.27°W	SE4817
Wentnor	Shropshire	52.52°N 02.91°W	SO3892
Wentworth	Cambridgeshire	52.38°N 00.15°E	TL4778
Wentworth	Rotherham	53.47°N 01.42°W	SK3898
Wenvoe	The Vale of Glamorgan	51.44°N 03.26°W	ST1272

=== Weo-Wess ===
Location	Locality	Coordinates (links to map & photo sources)	OS grid reference
Weobley	Herefordshire	52.15°N 02.87°W	SO4051
Weobley Marsh	Herefordshire	52.15°N 02.86°W	SO4151
Weoley Castle	Birmingham	52.43°N 01.97°W	SP0282
Wepham	West Sussex	50.86°N 00.52°W	TQ0408
Wepre	Flintshire	53.21°N 03.06°W	SJ2969
Wereham	Norfolk	52.58°N 00.47°E	TF6801
Wereham Row	Norfolk	52.57°N 00.46°E	TF6700
Wereton	Staffordshire	53.04°N 02.31°W	SJ7950
Wergs	Staffordshire	52.59°N 02.19°W	SJ8700
Wern (LLangynidr)	Powys	51.84°N 03.29°W	SO1117
Wern	Swansea	51.62°N 04.12°W	SS5394
Wern	Gwynedd	52.92°N 04.17°W	SH5439
Wern	Shropshire	52.89°N 03.08°W	SJ2734
Wern (Carreghofa)	Powys	52.77°N 03.11°W	SJ2520
Wern (Llandrinio)	Powys	52.70°N 03.11°W	SJ2513
Wern ddu	Shropshire	52.82°N 03.14°W	SJ2326
Werneth	Oldham	53.53°N 02.13°W	SD9104
Werneth Low	Stockport	53.42°N 02.07°W	SJ9592
Wernffrwd	Swansea	51.62°N 04.15°W	SS5194
Wernlas	Shropshire	52.77°N 03.02°W	SJ3120
Wern-olau	Swansea	51.63°N 04.08°W	SS5695
Wernrheolydd	Monmouthshire	51.80°N 02.88°W	SO3912
Wern Tarw	Bridgend	51.54°N 03.50°W	SS9684
Wern-y-cwrt	Monmouthshire	51.76°N 02.88°W	SO3908
Wern-y-gaer	Flintshire	53.21°N 03.19°W	SJ2069
Werrington	Cornwall	50.65°N 04.37°W	SX3287
Werrington	Staffordshire	53.02°N 02.09°W	SJ9447
Werrington	Cambridgeshire	52.61°N 00.28°W	TF1603
Wervin	Cheshire	53.23°N 02.87°W	SJ4271
Wescoe Hill	North Yorkshire	53.90°N 01.59°W	SE2746
Wesham	Lancashire	53.78°N 02.88°W	SD4232
Wessington	Derbyshire	53.10°N 01.44°W	SK3757

=== West A ===
Location	Locality	Coordinates (links to map & photo sources)	OS grid reference
West Aberthaw	The Vale Of Glamorgan	51.38°N 03.40°W	ST0266
Westacott	Devon	51.06°N 04.02°W	SS5832
West Acre	Norfolk	52.70°N 00.61°E	TF7715
West Acton	Ealing	51.51°N 00.28°W	TQ1981
West Adderbury	Oxfordshire	52.01°N 01.33°W	SP4635
West Allotment	North Tyneside	55.02°N 01.53°W	NZ3070
West Alvington	Devon	50.27°N 03.79°W	SX7243
West Amesbury	Wiltshire	51.16°N 01.80°W	SU1441
West Anstey	Devon	51.03°N 03.64°W	SS8527
West Appleton	North Yorkshire	54.34°N 01.67°W	SE2194
West Ardsley	Leeds	53.72°N 01.57°W	SE2825
West Arthurlie	East Renfrewshire	55.79°N 04.41°W	NS4958
West Ashby	Lincolnshire	53.23°N 00.11°W	TF2672
West Ashford	Devon	51.09°N 04.11°W	SS5235
West Ashling	West Sussex	50.85°N 00.86°W	SU8007
West Ashton	Wiltshire	51.29°N 02.18°W	ST8755
West Auckland	Durham	54.62°N 01.72°W	NZ1826
West Ayton	North Yorkshire	54.24°N 00.49°W	SE9884

=== West B ===
Location	Locality	Coordinates (links to map & photo sources)	OS grid reference
West Bagborough	Somerset	51.09°N 03.18°W	ST1733
West Balmirmer	Angus	56.53°N 02.70°W	NO5738
West Bank	Blaenau Gwent	51.73°N 03.14°W	SO2105
West Bank	Cheshire	53.34°N 02.73°W	SJ5183
Westbank	Derbyshire	53.03°N 01.46°W	SK3649
West Barkwith	Lincolnshire	53.30°N 00.27°W	TF1580
West Barnby	North Yorkshire	54.49°N 00.75°W	NZ8112
West Barnes	Kingston upon Thames	51.38°N 00.24°W	TQ2267
West Barns	East Lothian	55.99°N 02.56°W	NT6578
West Barsham	Norfolk	52.86°N 00.82°E	TF9033
West Bay	Dorset	50.70°N 02.76°W	SY4690
West Beckham	Norfolk	52.90°N 01.16°E	TG1339
West Bedfont	Surrey	51.44°N 00.46°W	TQ0773
West Benhar	North Lanarkshire	55.84°N 03.79°W	NS8863
West Bennan	North Ayrshire	55.44°N 05.19°W	NR9821
Westbere	Kent	51.30°N 01.14°E	TR1961
West Bergholt	Essex	51.90°N 00.84°E	TL9627
West Bexington	Dorset	50.67°N 02.66°W	SY5386
West Bilney	Norfolk	52.70°N 00.52°E	TF7115
West Blackdene	Durham	54.74°N 02.21°W	NY8639
West Blackdown	Devon	50.60°N 04.13°W	SX4981
West Blatchington	Brighton and Hove	50.83°N 00.19°W	TQ2706
West Bold	Scottish Borders	55.61°N 03.01°W	NT3636
West Boldon	South Tyneside	54.94°N 01.45°W	NZ3561
Westborough	Lincolnshire	52.98°N 00.73°W	SK8544
Westbourne	Hampshire	50.85°N 00.93°W	SU7507
Westbourne	Bournemouth	50.71°N 01.90°W	SZ0791
Westbourne	Suffolk	52.06°N 01.12°E	TM1445
Westbourne Green	City of Westminster	51.52°N 00.19°W	TQ2582
West Bourton	Dorset	51.06°N 02.34°W	ST7629
West Bowling	Bradford	53.77°N 01.75°W	SE1631
West Bradford	Lancashire	53.89°N 02.39°W	SD7444
West Bradley	Somerset	51.12°N 02.64°W	ST5536
West Bretton	Wakefield	53.61°N 01.57°W	SE2813
West Bridgford	Nottinghamshire	52.91°N 01.13°W	SK5836
West Brompton	Hammersmith and Fulham	51.47°N 00.20°W	TQ2577
West Bromwich	Sandwell	52.52°N 02.01°W	SO9992
Westbrook	Berkshire	51.43°N 01.39°W	SU4271
Westbrook	Cheshire	53.40°N 02.64°W	SJ5790
Westbrook	Herefordshire	52.08°N 03.05°W	SO2843
Westbrook	Kent	51.38°N 01.36°E	TR3470
Westbrook	Surrey	51.17°N 00.62°W	SU9643
Westbrook	Wiltshire	51.38°N 02.07°W	ST9565
Westbrook Green	Norfolk	52.38°N 01.09°E	TM1181
Westbrook Hay	Hertfordshire	51.73°N 00.52°W	TL0205
West Broughton	Derbyshire	52.89°N 01.79°W	SK1433
West Buckland	Somerset	50.97°N 03.18°W	ST1720
West Buckland	Devon	51.06°N 03.92°W	SS6531
Westburn	South Lanarkshire	55.81°N 04.14°W	NS6660
West Burnside	Aberdeenshire	56.82°N 02.49°W	NO7070
West Burra	Shetland Islands	60.07°N 01.32°W	HU376327
West Burrafirth	Shetland Islands	60.28°N 01.54°W	HU2556
West Burton	West Sussex	50.90°N 00.59°W	SU9913
West Burton	North Yorkshire	54.27°N 01.98°W	SE0186
Westbury	Buckinghamshire	52.01°N 01.09°W	SP6235
Westbury	Shropshire	52.67°N 02.96°W	SJ3509
Westbury	Wiltshire	51.24°N 02.20°W	ST8650
Westbury Leigh	Wiltshire	51.24°N 02.20°W	ST8650
Westbury-on-Severn	Gloucestershire	51.82°N 02.42°W	SO7114
Westbury on Trym	City of Bristol	51.49°N 02.63°W	ST5677
Westbury Park	City of Bristol	51.47°N 02.62°W	ST5775
Westbury-sub-Mendip	Somerset	51.22°N 02.71°W	ST5048
West Butsfield	Durham	54.79°N 01.84°W	NZ1044
West Butterwick	North Lincolnshire	53.53°N 00.74°W	SE8305
Westby	Lancashire	53.77°N 02.94°W	SD3831
Westby	Lincolnshire	52.84°N 00.56°W	SK9728
West Byfleet	Surrey	51.32°N 00.50°W	TQ0460

=== West C ===
Location	Locality	Coordinates (links to map & photo sources)	OS grid reference
West Caister	Norfolk	52.63°N 01.69°E	TG5011
West Calder	West Lothian	55.85°N 03.58°W	NT0163
West Camel	Somerset	51.01°N 02.61°W	ST5724
West Carlton	Leeds	53.87°N 01.69°W	SE2042
West Carr	City of Kingston upon Hull	53.77°N 00.34°W	TA0932
West Carr	North Lincolnshire	53.55°N 00.88°W	SE7407
West Chadsmoor	Staffordshire	52.70°N 02.03°W	SJ9812
West Challow	Oxfordshire	51.58°N 01.48°W	SU3688
West Charleton	Devon	50.26°N 03.75°W	SX7542
West Chelborough	Dorset	50.84°N 02.65°W	ST5405
West Chevington	Northumberland	55.26°N 01.65°W	NZ2297
West Chiltington	West Sussex	50.95°N 00.44°W	TQ0918
West Chiltington Common	West Sussex	50.94°N 00.46°W	TQ0817
West Chinnock	Somerset	50.91°N 02.76°W	ST4613
West Chirton	North Tyneside	55.00°N 01.48°W	NZ3368
West Chisenbury	Wiltshire	51.26°N 01.81°W	SU1352
West Clandon	Surrey	51.25°N 00.51°W	TQ0452
West Cliff	Poole	50.70°N 01.90°W	SZ0790
West Cliff	North Yorkshire	54.48°N 00.64°W	NZ8811
West Cliffe	Kent	51.14°N 01.34°E	TR3444
Westcliff-on-Sea	Essex	51.53°N 00.68°E	TQ8685
West Clyne	Highland	58.02°N 03.89°W	NC8805
West Coker	Somerset	50.91°N 02.69°W	ST5113
Westcombe (near Shepton Mallet)	Somerset	51.14°N 02.47°W	ST6739
Westcombe Park	Greenwich	51.484°N 0.018°E	TQ402780
Westcombe (near Somerton)	Somerset	51.05°N 02.77°W	ST4629
West Common	Hampshire	50.79°N 01.37°W	SU4400
West Compton	Somerset	51.17°N 02.58°W	ST5942
West Compton	Dorset	50.74°N 02.62°W	SY5694
West Cornforth	Durham	54.69°N 01.52°W	NZ3133
Westcot	Oxfordshire	51.58°N 01.52°W	SU3387
Westcotes	City of Leicester	52.62°N 01.15°W	SK5703
Westcott	Surrey	51.22°N 00.36°W	TQ1448
Westcott	Devon	50.82°N 03.39°W	ST0204
Westcott	Buckinghamshire	51.84°N 00.97°W	SP7117
Westcott	Shropshire	52.60°N 02.88°W	SJ4001
Westcott Barton	Oxfordshire	51.92°N 01.39°W	SP4225
Westcourt	Wiltshire	51.34°N 01.68°W	SU2261
West Cowick	East Riding of Yorkshire	53.68°N 01.03°W	SE6421
Westcroft	Milton Keynes	51.99°N 00.80°W	SP8234
Westcroft	Wolverhampton	52.61°N 02.10°W	SJ9302
West Cross	Kent	51.04°N 00.60°E	TQ8331
West Cross	Swansea	51.58°N 04.00°W	SS6189
West Crudwell	Wiltshire	51.63°N 02.08°W	ST9493
West Curry	Cornwall	50.71°N 04.43°W	SX2893
West Curthwaite	Cumbria	54.82°N 03.05°W	NY3248

=== West D ===
Location	Locality	Coordinates (links to map & photo sources)	OS grid reference
West Dean	Wiltshire	51.04°N 01.64°W	SU2527
West Dean	West Sussex	50.90°N 00.77°W	SU8612
Westdean	East Sussex	50.77°N 00.15°E	TV5299
West Deeping	Lincolnshire	52.65°N 00.36°W	TF1108
West Denant	Pembrokeshire	51.77°N 05.04°W	SM9013
Westdene	Brighton and Hove	50.85°N 00.16°W	TQ2908
West Denside	Angus	56.53°N 02.87°W	NO4638
West Denton	Newcastle upon Tyne	54.98°N 01.72°W	NZ1866
West Derby	Liverpool	53.43°N 02.91°W	SJ3993
West Dereham	Norfolk	52.58°N 00.44°E	TF6601
West Didsbury	Manchester	53.41°N 02.25°W	SJ8391
West Down	Hampshire	51.14°N 01.45°W	SU3838
West Down	Devon	51.15°N 04.13°W	SS5142
Westdown Camp	Wiltshire	51.22°N 01.94°W	SU0447
Westdowns	Cornwall	50.60°N 04.75°W	SX0582
West Downs	Cornwall	50.44°N 04.77°W	SX0364
West Drayton	Hillingdon	51.50°N 00.47°W	TQ0679
West Drayton	Nottinghamshire	53.25°N 00.95°W	SK7074
West Dulwich	Lambeth	51.43°N 00.10°W	TQ3272
West Dunnet	Highland	58.62°N 03.36°W	ND2171

=== West E ===
Location	Locality	Coordinates (links to map & photo sources)	OS grid reference
West Ealing	Ealing	51.50°N 00.32°W	TQ1680
West Edge	Derbyshire	53.16°N 01.50°W	SK3363
West Ella	East Riding of Yorkshire	53.74°N 00.48°W	TA0029

=== West End ===
Location	Locality	Coordinates (links to map & photo sources)	OS grid reference
West End (Bedford)	Bedfordshire	52.16°N 00.56°W	SP9853
West End (Little Staughton)	Bedfordshire	52.24°N 00.40°W	TL0962
West End (Waltham St Lawrence)	Berkshire	51.46°N 00.82°W	SU8275
West End (Warfield)	Berkshire	51.43°N 00.76°W	SU8671
West End	Cumbria	54.91°N 03.06°W	NY3258
West End	Doncaster	53.55°N 01.00°W	SE6607
West End	Dorset	50.81°N 02.14°W	ST9002
West End (South Cave)	East Riding of Yorkshire	53.75°N 00.62°W	SE9130
West End (Kilham)	East Riding of Yorkshire	54.06°N 00.39°W	TA0564
West End (Ulrome)	East Riding of Yorkshire	53.98°N 00.23°W	TA1656
West End (Preston)	East Riding of Yorkshire	53.75°N 00.22°W	TA1730
West End (Halsham)	East Riding of Yorkshire	53.72°N 00.07°W	TA2727
West End	Gloucestershire	51.67°N 02.18°W	ST8797
West End (Fareham)	Hampshire	50.84°N 01.20°W	SU5605
West End (East Hampshire)	Hampshire	51.11°N 01.10°W	SU6335
West End (Farnham)	Hampshire	51.17°N 00.82°W	SU8242
West End	Hertfordshire	51.75°N 00.17°W	TL2608
West End (Doddington)	Kent	51.27°N 00.75°E	TQ9257
West End (Herne Bay)	Kent	51.34°N 01.08°E	TR1565
West End	Kirklees	53.72°N 01.72°W	SE1825
West End (Morecambe)	Lancashire	54.06°N 02.87°W	SD4363
West End (Oswaldtwistle)	Lancashire	53.74°N 02.41°W	SD7328
West End	Leeds	53.83°N 01.65°W	SE2338
West End	Leicestershire	52.76°N 01.37°W	SK4219
West End (Marshchapel)	Lincolnshire	53.46°N 00.03°E	TF3598
West End (Benington)	Lincolnshire	52.99°N 00.05°E	TF3846
West End (Bradenham)	Norfolk	52.64°N 00.80°E	TF9009
West End (West Caister)	Norfolk	52.63°N 01.67°E	TG4911
West End	North Somerset	51.41°N 02.80°W	ST4469
West End (Thruscross)	North Yorkshire	54.00°N 01.78°W	SE1457
West End (Ulleskelf)	North Yorkshire	53.85°N 01.22°W	SE5140
West End (Wistow)	North Yorkshire	53.80°N 01.12°W	SE5835
Westend	Oxfordshire	51.89°N 01.53°W	SP3222
West End (Stanton Harcourt)	Oxfordshire	51.73°N 01.39°W	SP4204
West End (Cholsey)	Oxfordshire	51.57°N 01.16°W	SU5886
West End (Chewton Mendip)	Somerset	51.26°N 02.63°W	ST5652
West End (Bruton)	Somerset	51.10°N 02.47°W	ST6734
Westend	South Gloucestershire	51.62°N 02.57°W	ST6092
West End	South Gloucestershire	51.59°N 02.42°W	ST7188
West End	City of Southampton	50.92°N 01.34°W	SU4614
West End	Suffolk	52.39°N 01.61°E	TM4683
West End (Woking)	Surrey	51.33°N 00.65°W	SU9460
West End (Esher)	Surrey	51.35°N 00.39°W	TQ1263
West End	West Sussex	50.93°N 00.29°W	TQ2016
West End (Donhead St Andrew)	Wiltshire	51.00°N 02.12°W	ST9123
West End (Bremhill)	Wiltshire	51.49°N 02.04°W	ST9777
West End (Ebbesbourne Wake)	Wiltshire	51.01°N 02.02°W	ST9824
West End	Worcestershire	52.02°N 01.87°W	SP0936
West End	Caerphilly	51.64°N 03.14°W	ST2195
West End (Marian-y-mor)	Gwynedd	52.87°N 04.43°W	SH3634
West End	Monmouthshire	51.66°N 02.81°W	ST4496
West End	South Lanarkshire	55.69°N 03.65°W	NS9646
West End Green	Hampshire	51.34°N 01.05°W	SU6661
West-end Town	The Vale Of Glamorgan	51.40°N 03.49°W	SS9668
West End Town	Northumberland	54.97°N 02.36°W	NY7765
