= Wenallt (disambiguation) =

Wenallt is the name of several locations in Wales.

== Villages ==
- Wenallt, a hamlet in the community of Trawsgoed, Ceredigion,
- Pen-y-wenallt, a hamlet near Cenarth in Ceredigion

== Hills and mountains ==
- Gallt y Wenallt, a subsidiary summit of Y Lliwedd in Snowdonia
- Wenallt Hill, in Cardiff

== Other uses ==
- Wenallt Camp, an Iron Age enclosure in Cardiff
- Wenallt Formation, a geological formation near Garth in Powys
