= Lliwedd Bach =

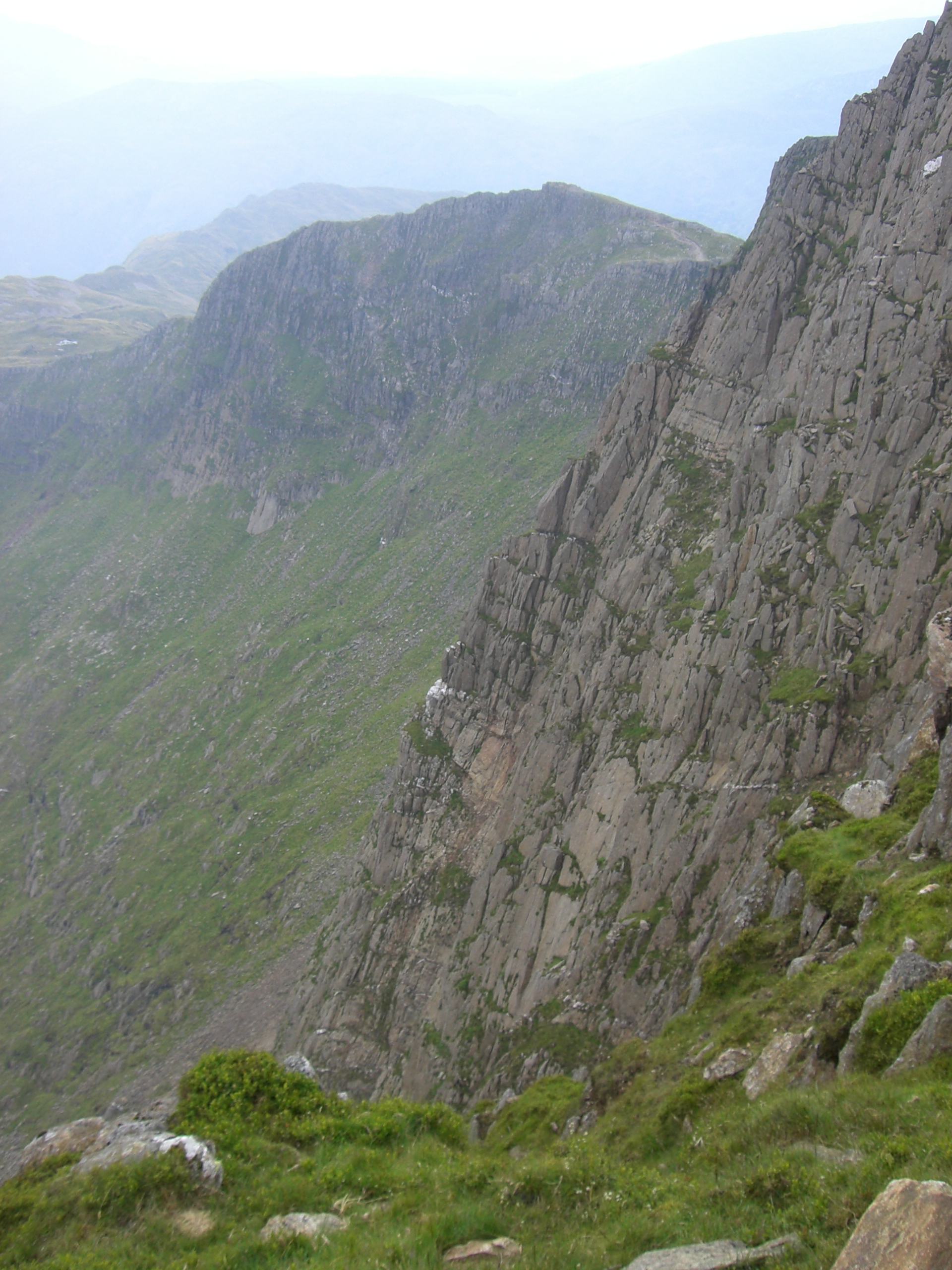
- Lliwedd Bach from near Y Lliwedd

Highest point
- Elevation: 818 m (2,684 ft)
- Prominence: 16 m (52 ft)
- Parent peak: Y Lliwedd
- Listing: Nuttall
- Coordinates: 53.0589°N 4.0490°W

Naming
- English translation: small colourless peak
- Language of name: Welsh
- Pronunciation: Welsh: [ˈɬɪwɛð bax]

Geography
- Location: Gwynedd, Wales
- Parent range: Snowdonia
- OS grid: SH622533
- Topo map: OS Landranger 115

Lliwedd Bach is a top of Y Lliwedd in the Snowdonia National Park, North Wales. It is the last "top" on the main ridge of Y Lliwedd, the other being Y Lliwedd East Peak. A broad ridge at around 580m carries on northwards until the subsidiary summit of Gallt y Wenallt is reached.

The summit is unmarked and offers good views of Y Lliwedd's cliffs, Snowdon (Yr Wyddfa) and Crib Goch.
