= Wellow =

Wellow could be one of these places in England:

- Wellow, Hampshire
- Wellow, Isle of Wight
- Wellow, Nottinghamshire
- Wellow, Somerset
