= Y Lliwedd East Peak =

Hill in Gwynedd, Wales

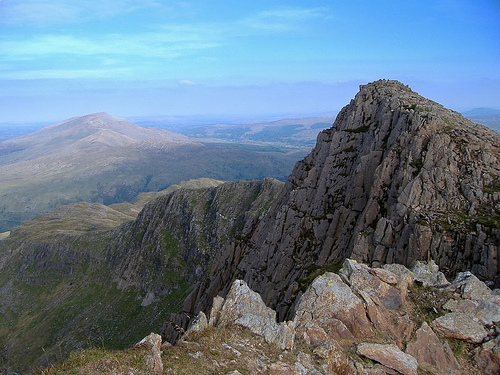
- Y Lliwedd East Peak from Y Lliwedd

Highest point
- Elevation: 893 m (2,930 ft)
- Prominence: 15 m (49 ft)
- Parent peak: Y Lliwedd
- Listing: Nuttall
- Coordinates: 53.0587°N 4.0547°W

Naming
- English translation: colourless peak
- Language of name: Welsh
- Pronunciation: Welsh: [ə ˈɬɪwɛð]

Geography
- Location: Gwynedd, Wales
- Parent range: Snowdonia
- OS grid: SH622533
- Topo map: OS Landranger 115

Y Lliwedd East Peak is the twin top of Y Lliwedd in the Snowdonia National Park, North Wales. It is only 5 metres shorter than the main summit of Y Lliwedd.

The summit marked by a small pile of stones, the views being similar to Y Lliwedd, except for Gallt y Wenallt being in view.
