= Church of St Michael the Archangel, Shalfleet =

Church on the Isle of Wight, England

Coordinates: 50°42′04″N 01°24′55″W

Church of St. Michael the Archangel, Shalfleet
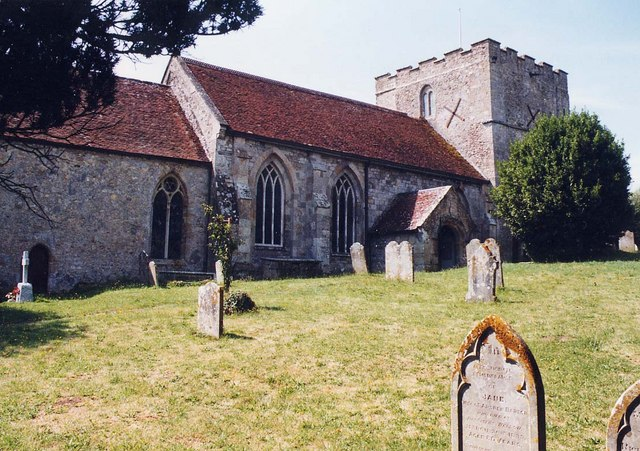
- Church of St. Michael the Archangel, Shalfleet
- Denomination: Church of England
- Churchmanship: Broad Church

History
- Dedication: St. Michael the Archangel

Administration
- Province: Canterbury
- Diocese: Portsmouth
- Parish: Shalfleet

The Church of St. Michael the Archangel, Shalfleet is a parish church in the Church of England located in Shalfleet, Isle of Wight.

== History ==
The church is medieval.

The dedication to St. Michael was made in 1964 as the previous dedication had been lost.

It has a tower that was built in 1070. It originally had no ground level door, and the entrance was through a door on the roof. Parishioners had to access the room by climbing a ladder. The walls of the church are five feet thick and it was a refuge for residents during attacks by the French who had sailed up Newtown Creek. A "3 pound" parish gun which was inscribed 'Schawflet' was kept in the tower until 1779.

The church had a steeple that was added around 1800, but the steeple was determined to be unstable and it was removed in 1912. The money for the steeple was raised by selling the parish gun and the church bells. This resulted in a local rhyme:

"Shalfleet poor and simple people
Sold their bells to build a steeple."

In 1889 the plaster was removed from ceiling and walls—the latter a questionable proceeding—the tower arch unblocked, a new door cut through the north face and the east window of the aisle reconstructed.

The church is fortunate in having escaped late additions and thus remaining an excellent example, with the exception of the tower, of late 13th-century work. The entry is by the north door, bearing the date 1754 on its inner face, through the 12th-century opening with its primitive carved tympanum. The north wall is practically modern work, partly rebuilt on the old foundation and of the same thickness in 1812, when wooden mullioned windows with brick reveals took the place of what may have been 15th-century lights. The insertion of the wide arch in the 13th century, practically cutting away the whole eastern face of the tower at this stage, has resulted in a serious subsidence to the north and east, with a corresponding contortion of the arch. When this was blocked as a precautionary measure there is nothing to show, but its opening in 1889 and the cutting of a door in the northern face of the tower was an unwise and risky proceeding, probably resulting in the serious crack in the upper part of the north-east angle.

A noticeable feature in the church is that the floor slopes down gradually to the east end without a break at the chancel arch.

The two bells in the tower are inscribed 'May all whom I shall summon to the grave, The ransom of a well-spent life receive. Thos. Way, James Street, Churchwardens, 1815. T. Mears of London fecit.' The smaller bell has only the names of the churchwardens, J. Jolliffe and J. Cooper, and the date 1807.

The churchyard contains the Commonwealth war grave of a World War II officer of the Queen's (Royal West Surrey) Regiment.
