= Y Lliwedd =

Mountain in North Wales

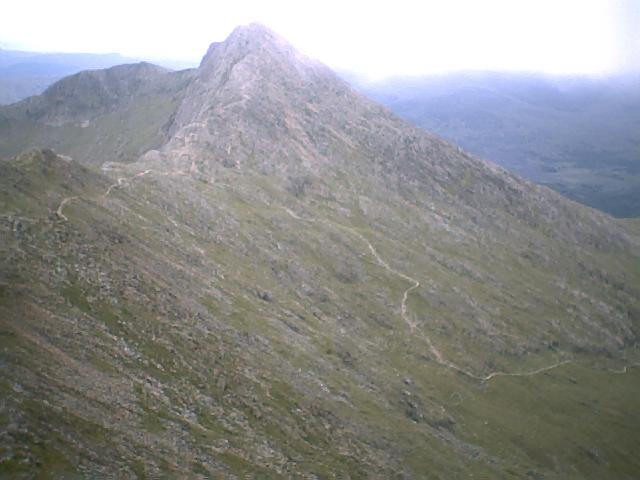
- Y Lliwedd from Snowdon

Highest point
- Elevation: 898 m (2,946 ft)
- Prominence: 154 m (505 ft)
- Parent peak: Snowdon
- Listing: Marilyn, Hewitt, Nuttall
- Coordinates: 53°03′36″N 4°03′25″W

Naming
- English translation: colourless peak
- Language of name: Welsh
- Pronunciation: Welsh: [ə ˈɬɪwɛð]

Geography
- Location: Gwynedd, Wales
- Parent range: Snowdonia
- OS grid: SH622533
- Topo map: OS Landranger 115

Listed summits of Y Lliwedd
Name	Grid ref	Height	Status
Y Lliwedd East Peak		893 m (2,930 ft)	Nuttall
Lliwedd Bach		818 m (2,684 ft)	Nuttall
Gallt y Wenallt		619 m (2,031 ft)	Hewitt, Nuttall

Y Lliwedd is a mountain, connected to Snowdon in the Snowdonia National Park, North Wales.

Its summit lies 898 metres (2,946 ft) above sea level.

The eastern flanks are steep cliffs rising above the lakes of Glaslyn and Llyn Llydaw. Y Lliwedd is the most conspicuous of the peaks for those who approach Snowdon via the Miners' and Pyg tracks.

Hikers and mountaineers will pass over Y Lliwedd when walking the Snowdon Horseshoe. The noted British climber George Mallory undertook many of his early climbs here. It was also the site of considerable training activity for the 1953 British Everest Expedition.

The north face of Y Lliwedd was explored in the late 19th century and in 1909 was the subject of the first British climbing guide, The Climbs on Lliwedd by J. M. A. Thomson and A. W. Andrews.

Two subsidiary peaks of Y Lliwedd are listed as Nuttalls: Lliwedd Bach 818 metres (2,684 ft): SH628532 and Y Lliwedd East Peak 893 metres (2,930 ft): SH623532.

== Gallery ==
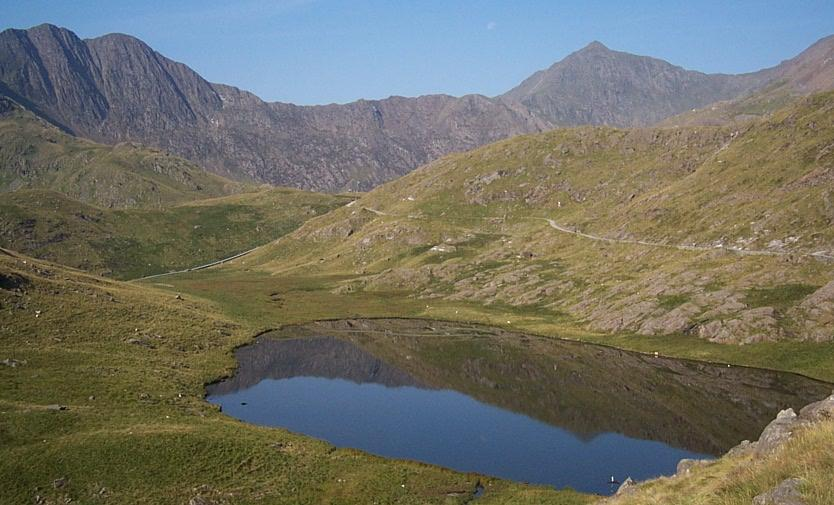
Y Lliwedd on the left, Snowdon on the right

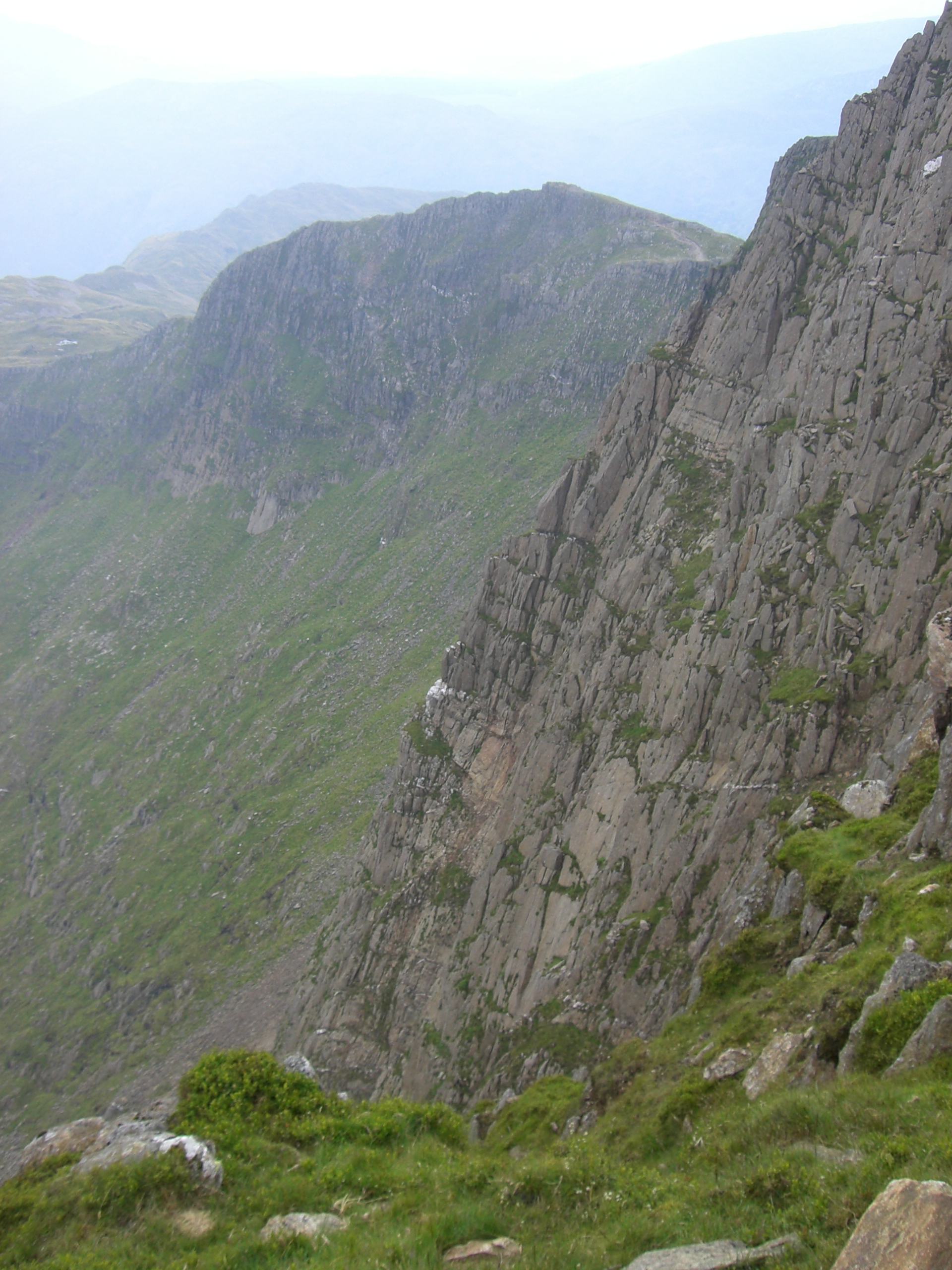
Typical steep grassy and loose section of cliff

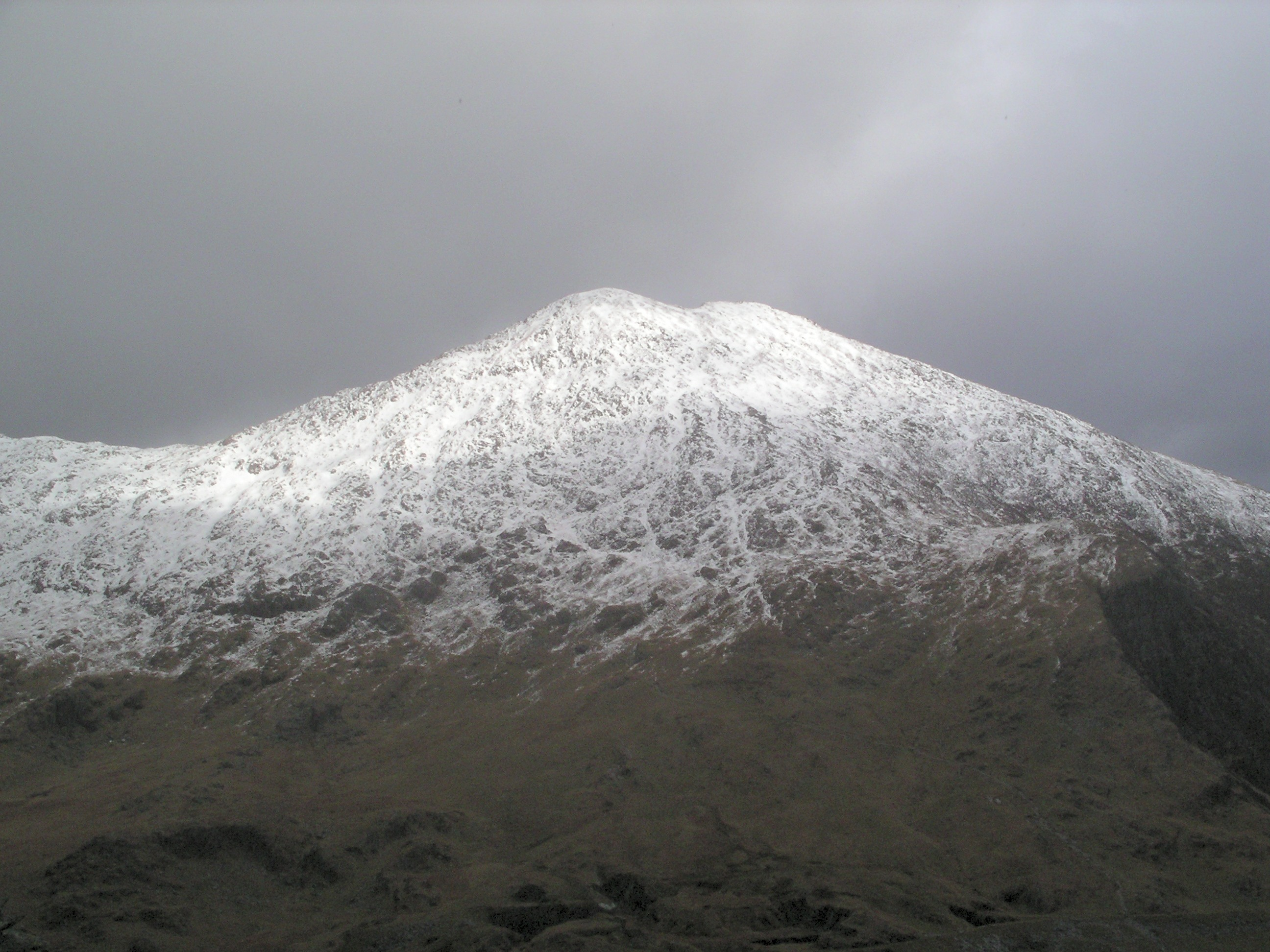
Y Lliwedd in snow from the flank of Yr Aran
