= Sparsholt, Oxfordshire =

Village in Oxfordshire, England

Coordinates: 51.586°N 1.501°W

Sparsholt
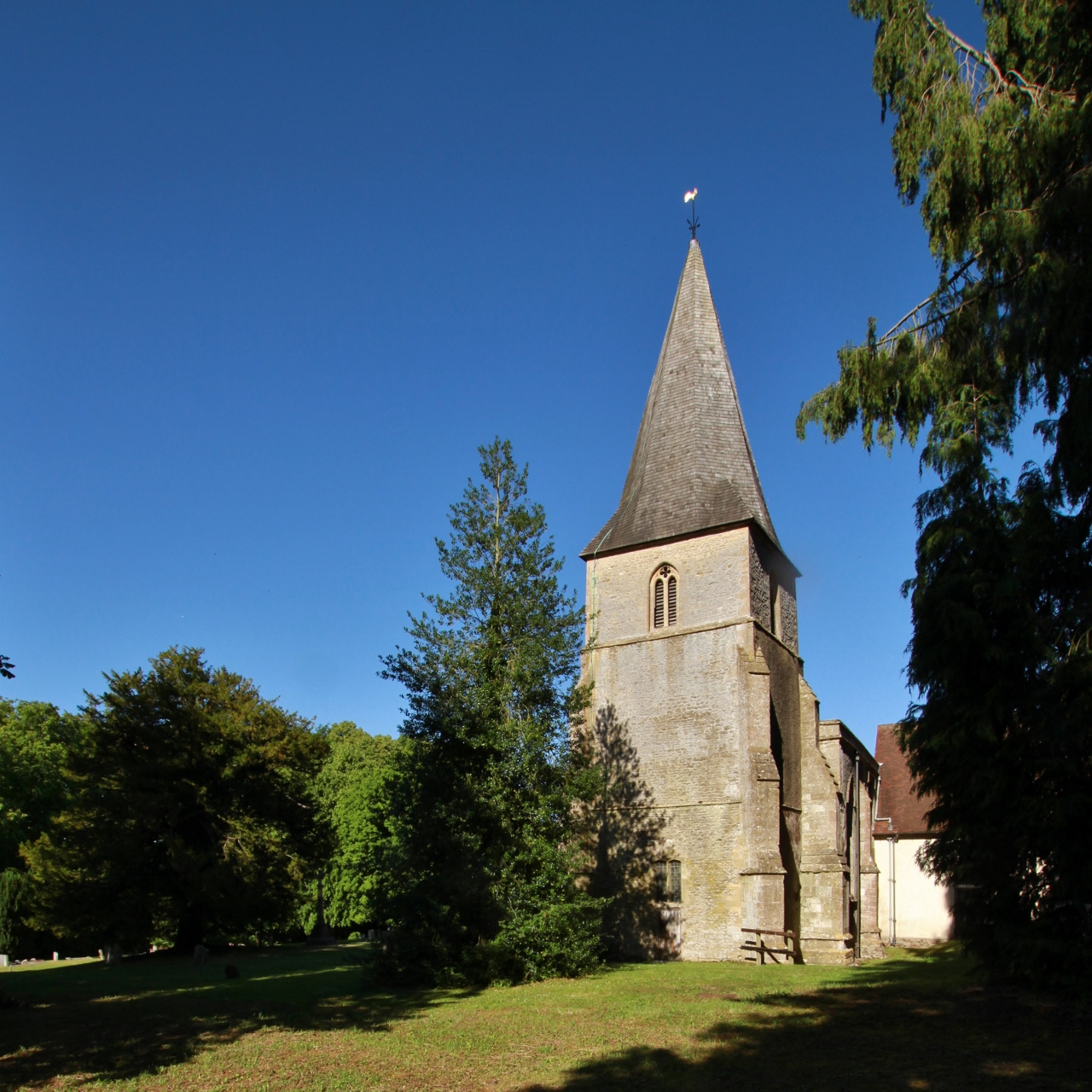
- Holy Rood parish church

- Location within Oxfordshire
- Population: 297 (2011 census)
- OS grid reference: SU3487
- Civil parish: Sparsholt
- District: Vale of White Horse
- Shire county: Oxfordshire
- Region: South East
- Country: England
- Sovereign state: United Kingdom
- Post town: Wantage
- Postcode district: OX12
- Dialling code: 01235
- Police: Thames Valley
- Fire: Oxfordshire
- Ambulance: South Central
- UK Parliament: Didcot and Wantage
- Website: Sparsholt & Westcot, Oxfordshire

Sparsholt is a village and civil parish about 3 miles (5 km) west of Wantage in the Vale of White Horse district of Oxfordshire. The parish includes the hamlet of Westcot about 1/2 mile (800 m) west of the village. Sparsholt was part of Berkshire until the 1974 boundary changes transferred the Vale of White Horse to Oxfordshire.

== Geography ==
Sparsholt village is a spring line settlement at the foot of the Berkshire Downs escarpment. The parish measures more than 5 miles (8 km) miles north – south but less than 1 mile (1.6 km) east – west. It is bounded to the north by Stutfield Brook, a tributary of the River Ock. On the other sides it is bounded by field boundaries. In 1924 the parish's area was 5,311 acres (2,149 ha). The highest point in the parish is Sparsholt Down, a chalk hill 1 1/2 miles (2.4 km) south of the village, whose summit is 801 feet (244 m) above sea level.

== Toponymy ==
The earliest known record of the place-name is as Speresholte or Speresholt in an Anglo-Saxon charter from 963 now reproduced in the Cartularium Saxonicum. The Domesday Book of 1086 records it as Spersolt and a pipe roll from 1156 records it as Speresholt. It is derived from Old English and probably means "wood where spear-shafts were obtained".

== Manor ==
The Domesday Book records that Sparsholt was a large manor of 16 hides. It was a royal manor from the Norman Conquest of England until the reign of King Henry I, who granted it with the manor of Aldermaston to Robert Achard for one knight's fee. Sparsholt remained with Aldermaston until 1622, when Sir Humphrey Forster sold it to Elizabeth, Lady Craven. She left it to her son William Craven, 1st Earl of Craven, who in 1660 conveyed it to his cousin Anthony Craven, who was made a baronet in 1661. It then passed to Anthony Craven's descendants in the Palmer, Richmond and Gabbit families until 1807, when it was sold to a Rev. John Hippisley. The Hippisley family still held the manor in 1924.

== Parish church ==
The oldest part of the Church of England parish church of the Holy Cross is the nave, which was built in the 12th century. The church has a 13th-century west tower, and 13th-century arches leading to the chancel and south transept. In the 14th century the chancel and transept were rebuilt and several new windows were inserted. The chancel was given a Decorated Gothic piscina and triple sedilia with ornate cusped arches. A pair of tomb recesses in a similar style was installed, one on the south side of the chancel beside the sedilia and the other on the north side. In the transept are three rare 14th-century oak effigies, two of them under canopies like those in the chancel. Some 13th- and 14th-century stained glass survives in the church. Late in the 15th century a vestry was added on the north side of the chancel, more windows were inserted in the nave and the nave roof was replaced. The church is a grade I listed building.

On the north wall in the nave is a large Renaissance monument with strapwork flanked by Doric columns. It commemorates John Playdell who died in 1591 and his wife Bridget who died in 1623. In the south transept is a smaller Renaissance monument with strapwork flanked by Ionic columns. It commemorates Sir George Hyde KG of Kingston Lisle who also died in 1623. The chancel has a 17th-century collar truss roof. The north porch is late 18th-century, as probably is the transept roof. In the 19th century a Gothic Revival traceried wooden screen was inserted in the chancel arch. The west tower has a ring of four bells. Joseph Carter of Reading cast the treble and third bells in 1578 and the tenor bell in 1603. Mears and Stainbank of the Whitechapel Bell Foundry cast or re-cast the second bell in 1914. Holy Cross parish is part of the Ridgeway Benefice, along with the parishes of Childrey, Kingston Lisle, Letcombe Bassett, Letcombe Regis and West Challow.

== Amenities ==
A small annual income to run a parish Sunday school was established by private donations in the 18th century. In 1874 a school and adjoining cottages were built at the junction of Sparsholt Street and Church Way. In 1964 the school was closed and in 1968 the building was bought for conversion into a village hall. The hall was modernised in 2007. Sparsholt has a public house, The Sparsholt. which has recently been refurbished under new ownership.

== Canal ==
Between 1805 and 1807 the section of the Wilts and Berks Canal between Longcot and Challow was completed. It passes through the parish less than 3/4 mile (1.2 km) north of the village. Traffic on the canal had all but ceased by 1901 and the route was formally abandoned in 1914. The Wilts & Berks Canal Trust is currently restoring the canal.

== Gallery ==
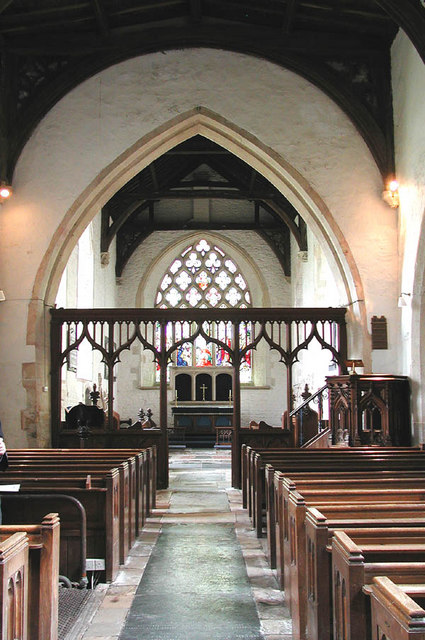
Inside Holy Cross parish church

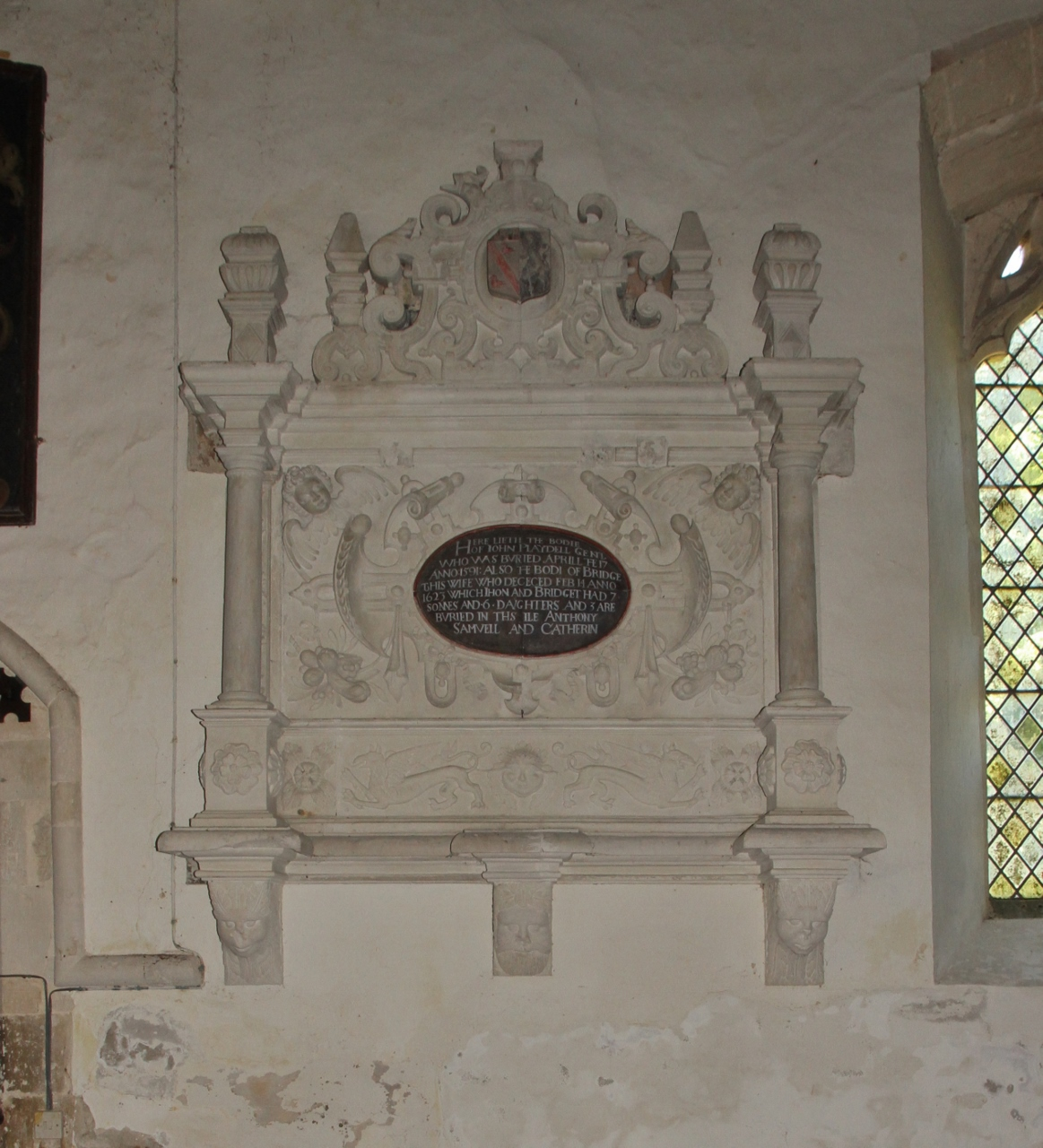
Monument to John and Bridget Playdell in Holy Rood church

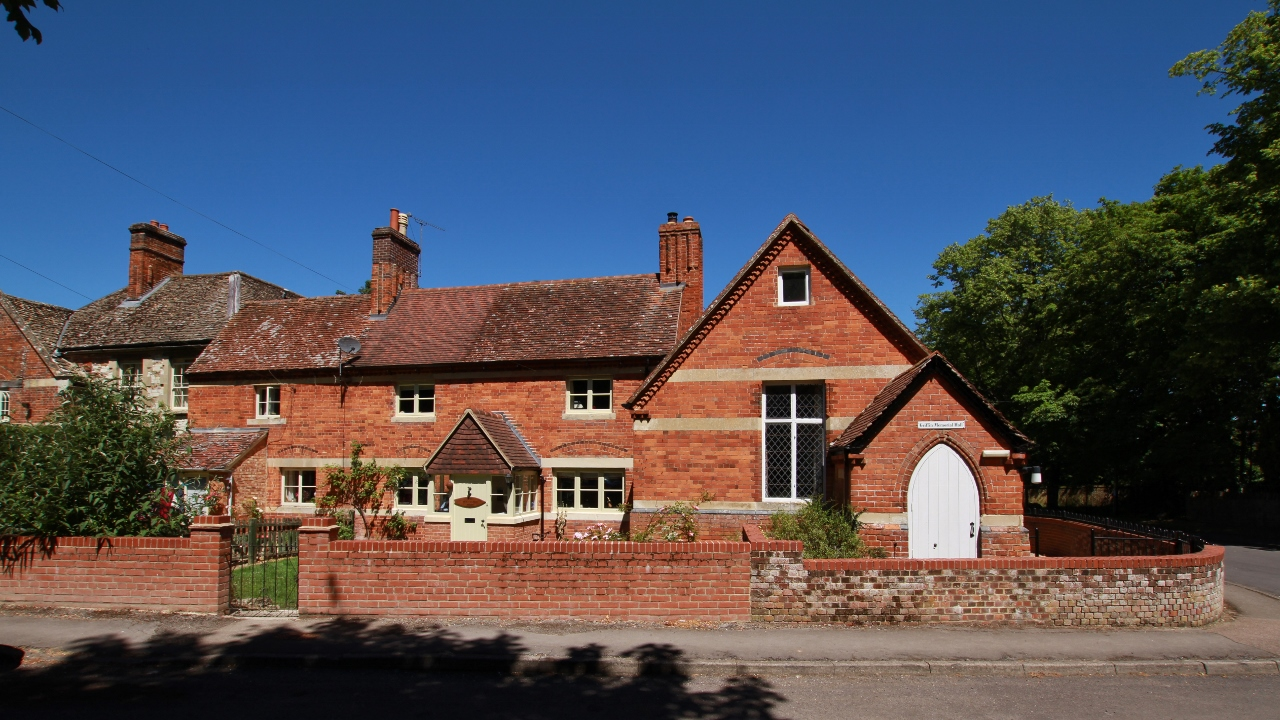
Griffin Memorial Hall (right) and adjoining cottages (centre and left)

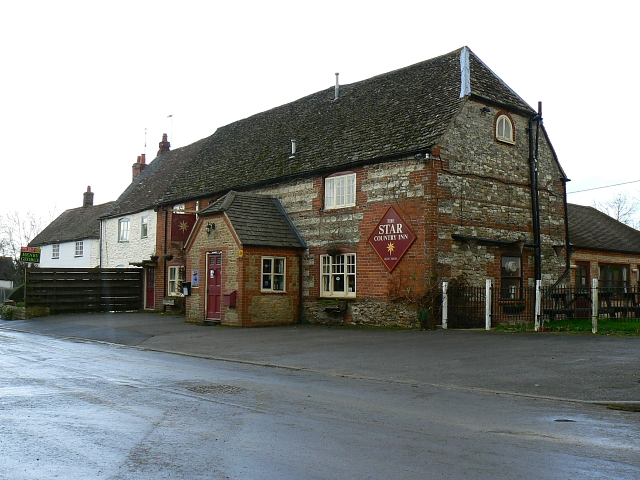
The Star Inn

== Bibliography ==
- Dalby, LJ (2000) [1971]. The Wilts and Berks Canal (3rd ed.). Usk: Oakwood Press. p. 23. ISBN 0-85361-562-4.
- Ditchfield, PH; Page, William, eds. (1924). "Sparsholt". A History of the County of Berkshire. Victoria County History. Vol. IV. assisted by John Hautenville Cope. London: The St Katherine Press. pp. 311–319.
- Ekwall, Eilert (1960) [1936]. Concise Oxford Dictionary of English Place-Names (4th ed.). Oxford: Oxford University Press. Sparsholt. ISBN 0198691033.
- Haval, Nikhilesh. "Holy Cross, Sparsholt". Oxfordshire in 360 degrees. Nikreations.
- Pevsner, Nikolaus (1966). Berkshire. The Buildings of England. Harmondsworth: Penguin Books. pp. 223–224.
