= Shalfleet =

Village and civil parish on Isle of Wight, England

Coordinates: 50.70112°N 1.41517°W

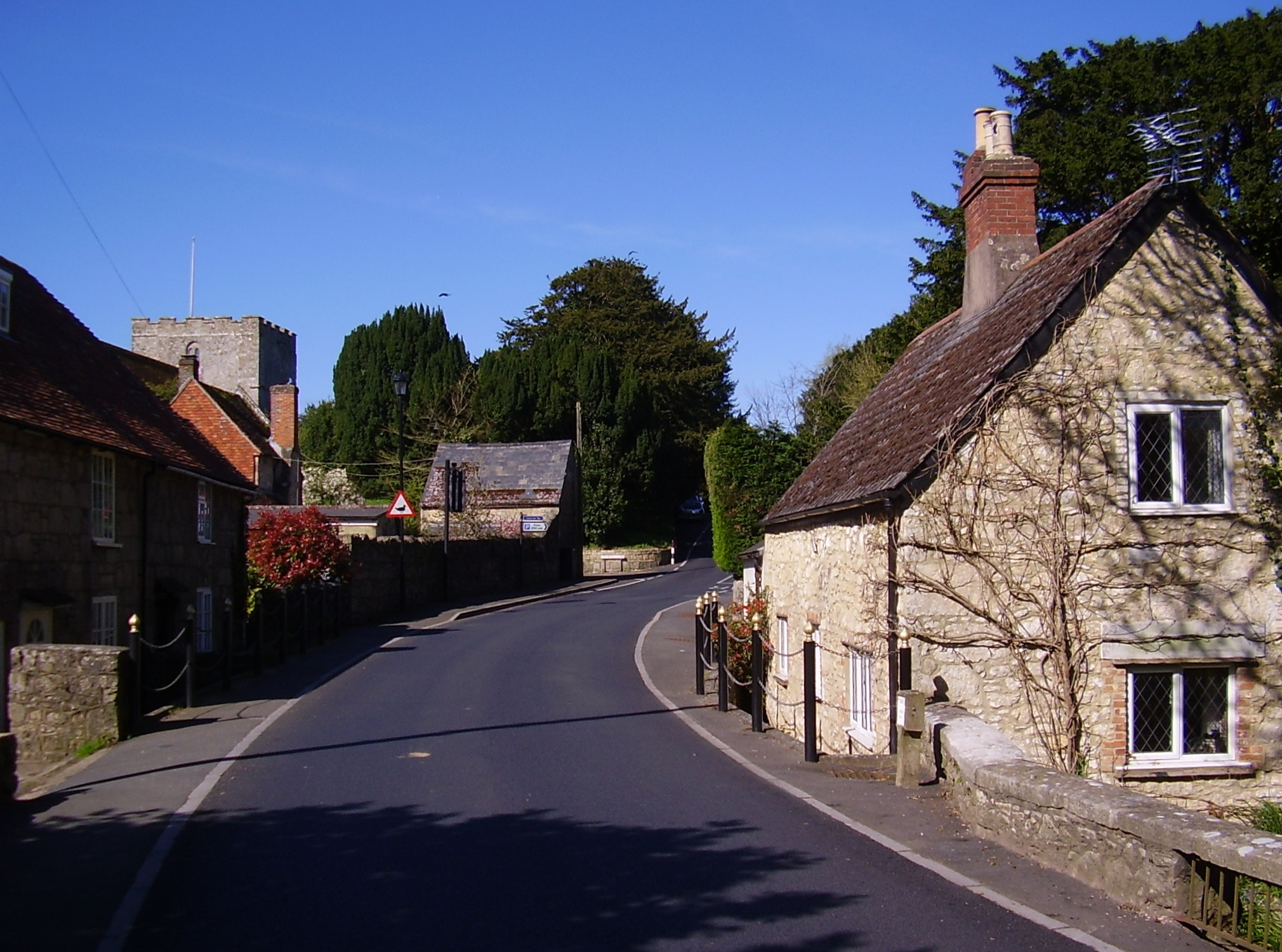
- Shalfleet village

- Location within the Isle of Wight
- Population: 1,627 (2021 census)
- OS grid reference: SZ413892
- Civil parish: Shalfleet
- Unitary authority: Isle of Wight
- Ceremonial county: Isle of Wight
- Region: South East
- Country: England
- Sovereign state: United Kingdom
- Post town: Newport
- Postcode district: PO30
- Dialling code: 01983
- Police: Hampshire and Isle of Wight
- Fire: Hampshire and Isle of Wight
- Ambulance: Isle of Wight
- UK Parliament: Isle of Wight West

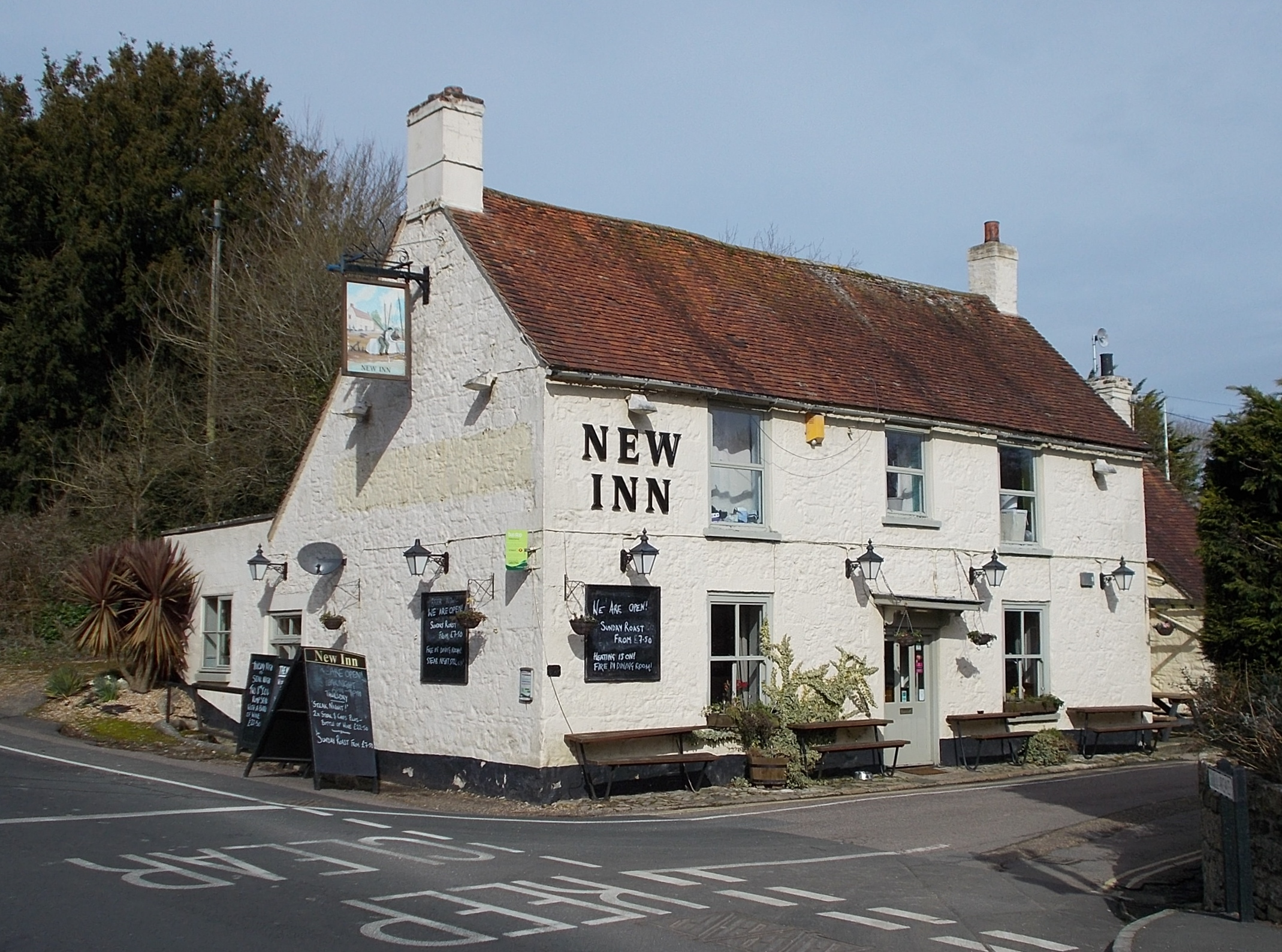
The New Inn, Shalfleet

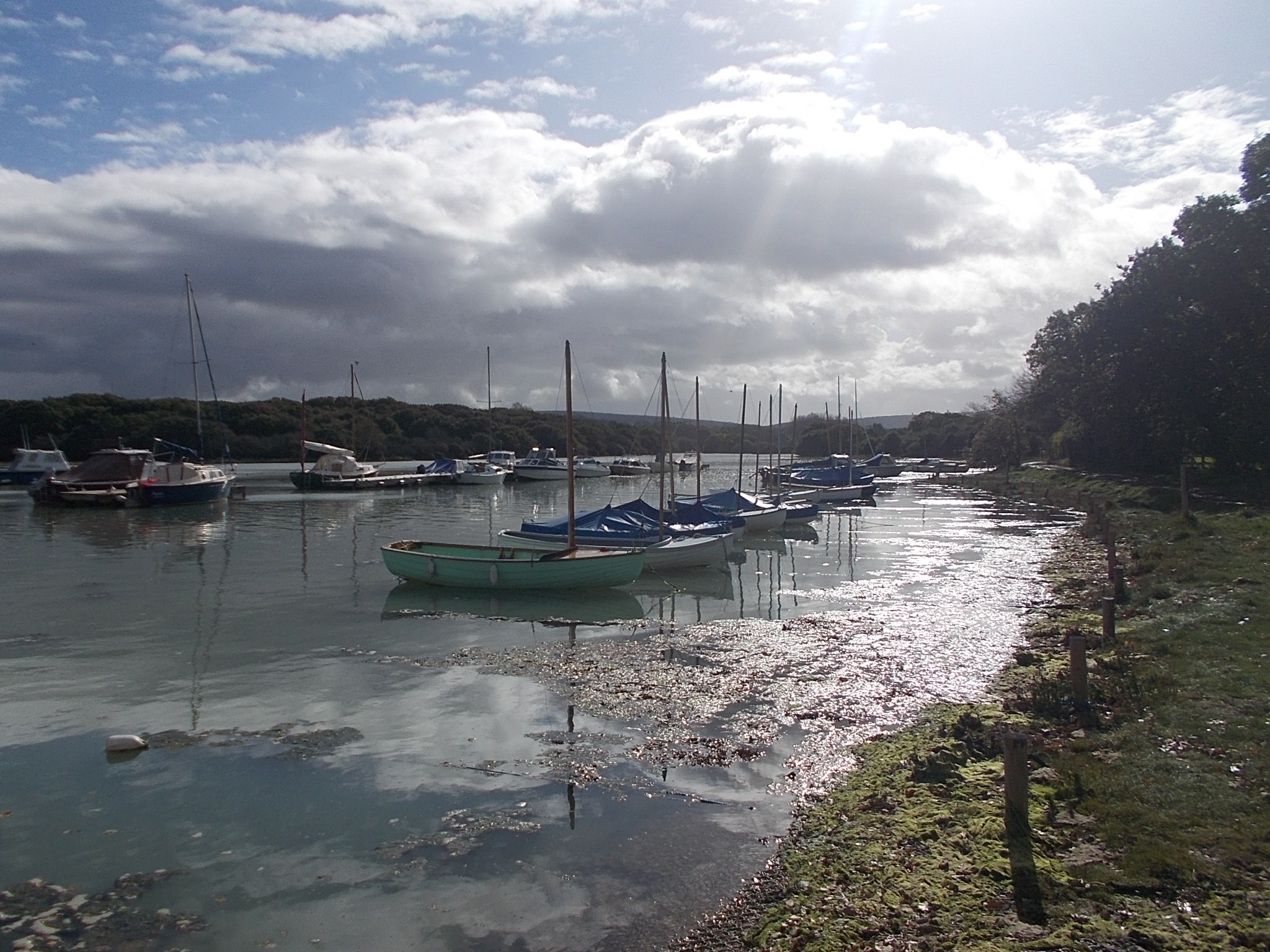
Boats moored at Shalfleet Lake, a tributary of the Newtown River, just north of the village

Shalfleet is a village and civil parish on the Isle of Wight. It is located between Yarmouth and Newport in the northwest of the island.

The civil parish includes the settlements of Cranmore, Hamstead, Newbridge, Ningwood, Shalcombe and Thorley Street, and had a population of 1,627 at the 2021 census.

== Name ==
Its name means '(the place at) the shallow stream', from Old English sceald (dative case scealdan) and flēot, referring to the Caul Bourne.

838 (in a 12th century copy of a Saxon charter): æt Scealdan fleote

1086 (Domesday Book): Seldeflet

1141–1142: Schaldflete

1189–1204: Scaldeflet

1397: Shalflete

== History ==
The Church of St. Michael the Archangel, Shalfleet was dedicated to St. Michael the Archangel in 1964. The Baptist church in the village of Wellow, was founded in 1801. There were several Methodist churches as well, which have all closed. Shalfleet had a railway station, shared with Calbourne, that was closed in 1953 when the line from Newport to Freshwater ceased operating. The New Inn pub dates from 1743.

The Domesday Book noted the existence of the Shalfleet Mill. This mill was driven by a waterwheel. The associated bakery produced bread until the 1920s. There are three manor houses in the Shalfleet area that were mentioned in the Domesday book; the Shalfleet Manor House, Ningwood Manor, and Hamstead Manor.

In August 2009 metal detectorists searching near Shalfleet discovered an Iron Age hoard, the Shalfleet Hoard, consisting of four large bowl-shaped silver ingots, six small silver fragments, and one gold British B (or, 'Chute',) stater. The discovery of this hoard contributes to the evidence that the Isle of Wight was occupied by the Celtic tribe, the Durotriges, during the Late Iron Age. The hoard was reported to the Portable Antiquities Scheme, sent to the British Museum for examination, and ultimately sold at auction.

== Demographics ==
Census population of Shalfleet parish
| Census | Population | Female | Male | Households | Source |
|---|---|---|---|---|---|
| 2001 | 1,534 | 801 | 733 | 676 | |
| 2011 | 1,546 | 790 | 756 | 698 | |
| 2021 | 1,627 | 820 | 807 | 756 | |

== Transport ==
The village is linked to other parts of the Island by Southern Vectis bus route 7, serving Freshwater, Yarmouth and Newport as well as intermediate villages.
