= Wenallt, Cardiff =

Hill in Cardiff, Wales

Coordinates: 51.5441°N 3.2228°W

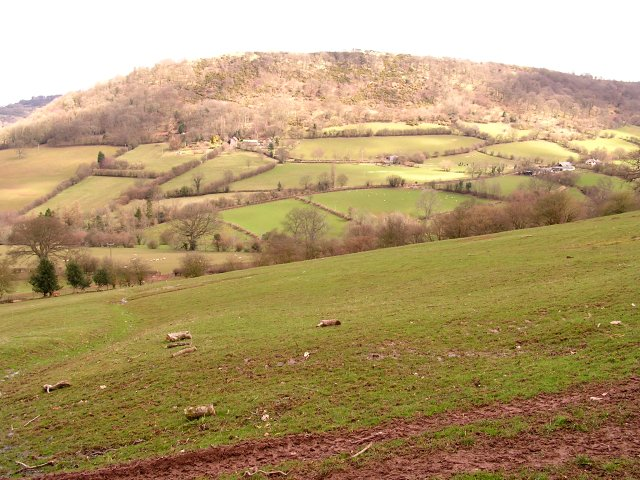
Wenallt Hill

Wenallt (often called simply The Wenallt) is located to the north of Cardiff, Wales. The name is Welsh and translates to 'white wooded slope'. Ordnance Survey mapping shows the highest point as 229 m (751 ft), although another source suggests a height of 232 m (761 ft).

Although Cardiff residents sometimes call it a mountain, it is too low to be classified as a mountain. It is owned by Cardiff County Council and operated as public land, and looks down onto the village of Rhiwbina in the northern suburbs of Cardiff.

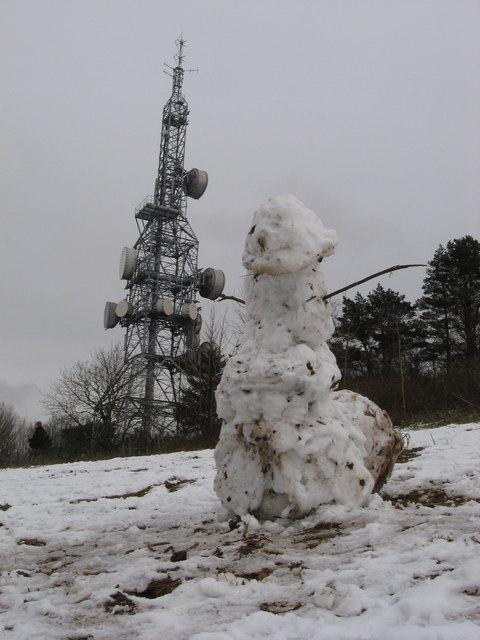
Telecommunications tower

A large telecommunications tower is located at the top of the hill, near to which is a heavily vandalised former military bunker.

Wenallt Camp is the remains of an Iron Age enclosure on the southern slopes of the hill.

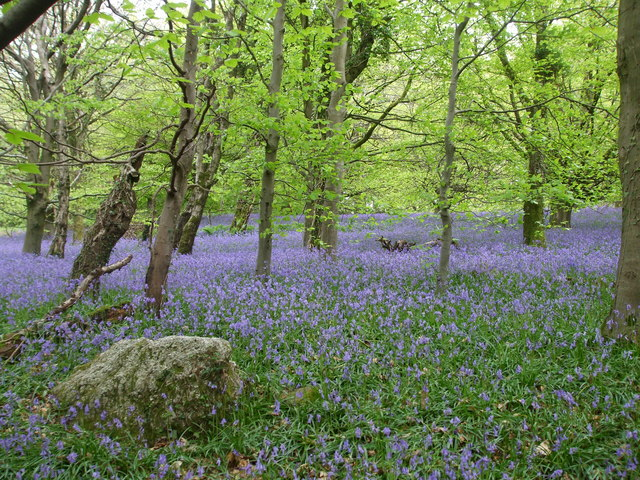
Bluebells in the woods in spring

Together with the Garth Mountain a mile or so to the west, Wenallt Hill can be seen from most of Cardiff city centre. On a clear day they can be seen from Weston-super-Mare in England, 18 miles (29 km) away on the other side of over the Bristol Channel.

The south facing slope of the hill overlooking Cardiff is now covered in trees, whereas in the early-1970s it was covered in ferns and bracken with a network of paths crisscrossing the slope. Bluebells are abundant in May.

Coed y Wenallt is a 44 ha (0.17 sq mi) area of ancient woodland on the western side of the hill. It is an SSSI and under the care of the Woodland Trust.
