= Westcot =

Hamlet in Oxfordshire, England

Coordinates: 51.585°N 1.517°W

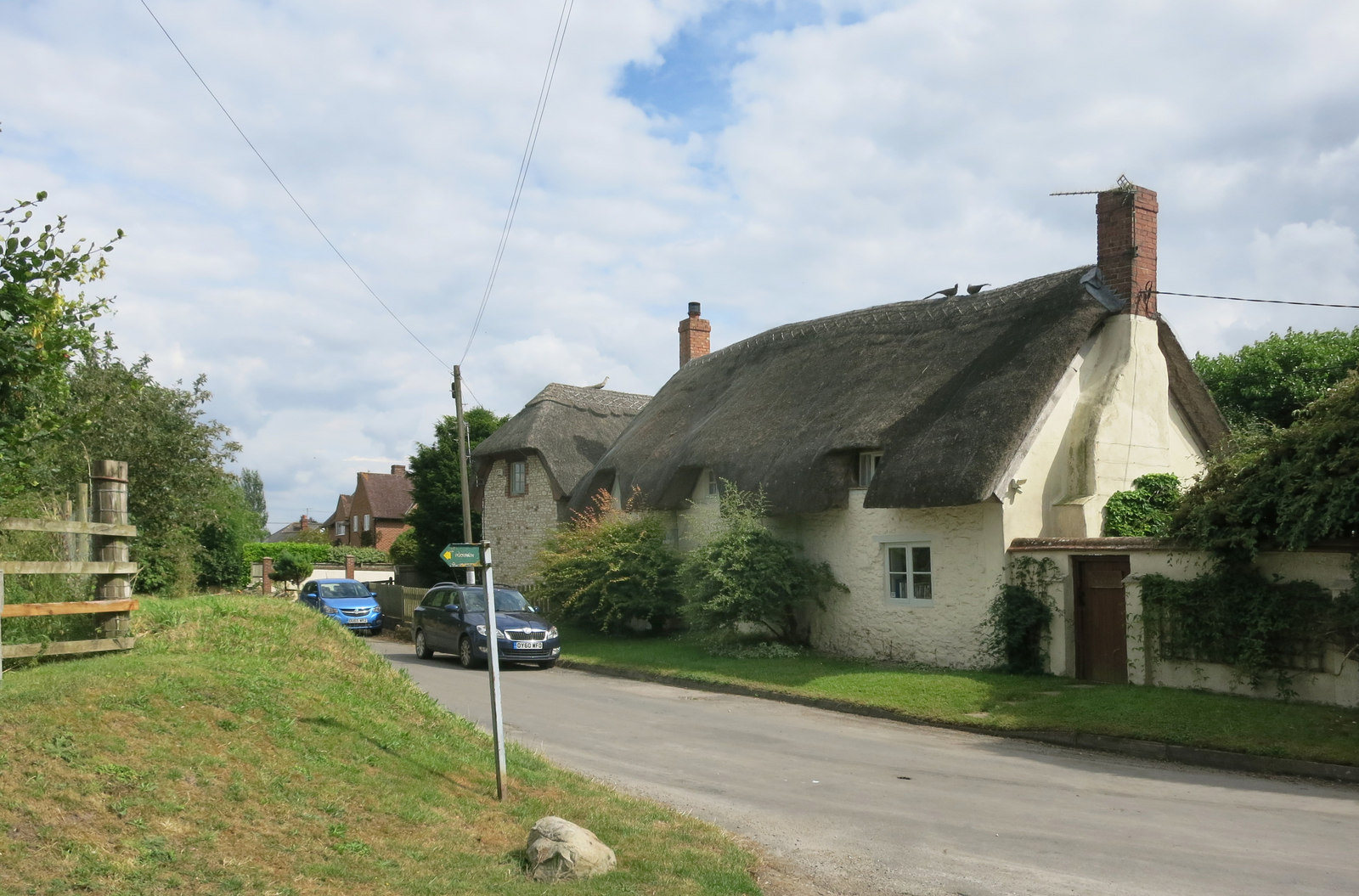

- Location within Oxfordshire
- OS grid reference: SU3387
  - London: 73.5 miles (118.3 km)
- Civil parish: Sparsholt
- District: Vale of White Horse
- Shire county: Oxfordshire
- Region: South East
- Country: England
- Sovereign state: United Kingdom
- Post town: Wantage
- Postcode district: OX12
- Dialling code: 01235
- Police: Thames Valley
- Fire: Oxfordshire
- Ambulance: South Central
- UK Parliament: Didcot and Wantage
- Website: Sparsholt and Westcot

Westcot is a hamlet in the civil parish of Sparsholt, in the Vale of White Horse district, in Oxfordshire, England, about 4 miles (6.4 km) west of Wantage.

Westcot Camera was situated here, a property of the Templars and later of the Hospitallers until the order and their houses were suppressed in the Reformation and the Dissolution of the Monasteries, when the site contained a gatehouse and a dwelling house, of which nothing remains. After the Dissolution a private house, Westcott House, was built near the site.
