= Week Green =

Hamlet in Cornwall

Coordinates: 50°45′00″N 4°30′12″W

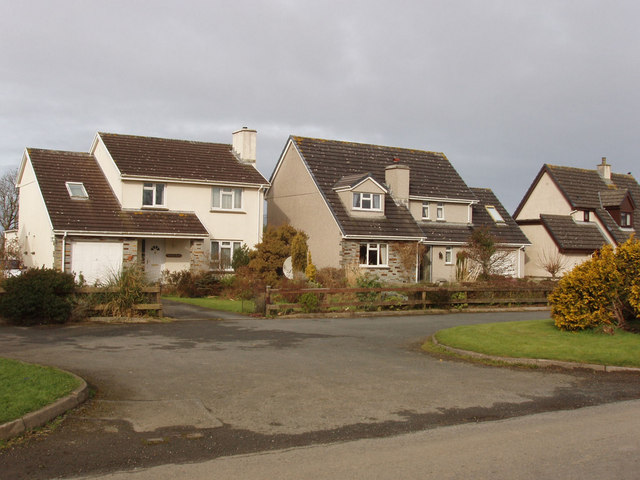
Houses in Week Green

Week Green is a hamlet in north Cornwall, England, United Kingdom. It is south of and near to Week St Mary.
