= Wearde =

Coordinates: 50.405°N 4.217°W

Wearde is a southeastern suburb of Saltash in Cornwall, England, UK.
