= Wellpond Green =

Hamlet in the United Kingdom

Coordinates: 51°52′51″N 0°03′10″E

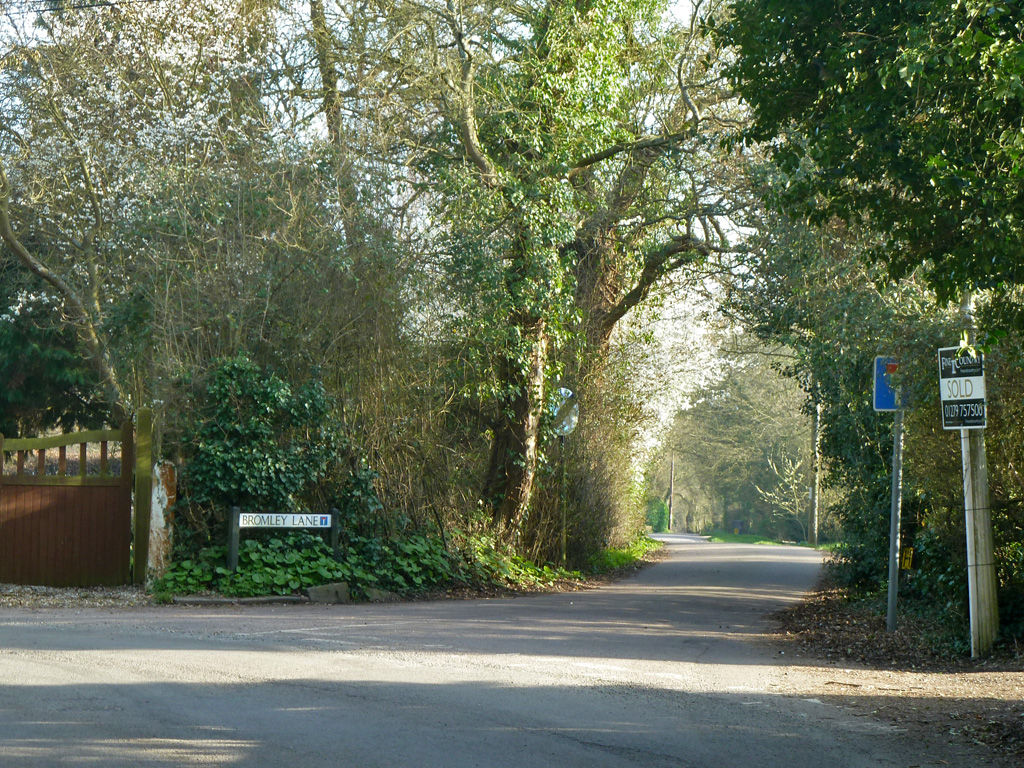
- Start of Bromley Lane

- Location within Hertfordshire
- Civil parish: Standon
- District: East Hertfordshire
- Shire county: Hertfordshire
- Region: East
- Country: England
- Sovereign state: United Kingdom
- Police: Hertfordshire
- Fire: Hertfordshire
- Ambulance: East of England

Wellpond Green is a hamlet in the civil parish of Standon, in the East Hertfordshire district, in the county of Hertfordshire, England, near the A120 road and the town of Bishop's Stortford. Wellpond Green contains 4 listed buildings.
