= Westdowns =

Hamlet in Cornwall, England

Coordinates: 50.6121°N 4.7443°W

- Location within Cornwall
- OS grid reference: SX059828
- Civil parish: St Teath
- Unitary authority: Cornwall
- Ceremonial county: Cornwall
- Region: South West
- Country: England
- Sovereign state: United Kingdom
- Post town: DELABOLE
- Postcode district: PL33
- Dialling code: 01840
- Police: Devon and Cornwall
- Fire: Cornwall
- Ambulance: South Western
- UK Parliament: North Cornwall

Westdowns (sometimes spelt incorrectly as Westdown) is a small hamlet in north Cornwall, England, United Kingdom. It lies half-a-mile south-west of Delabole and is sometimes considered part of that village, however, Westdowns is a distinct settlement. It is on the B3314 road.

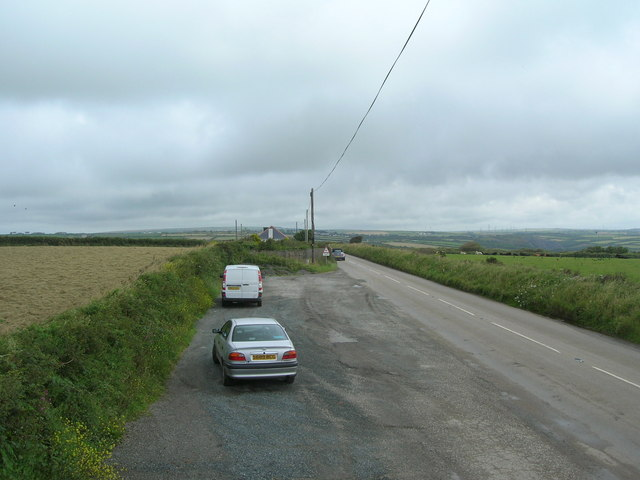
A lay-by near Westdowns
