= Wenallt Camp =

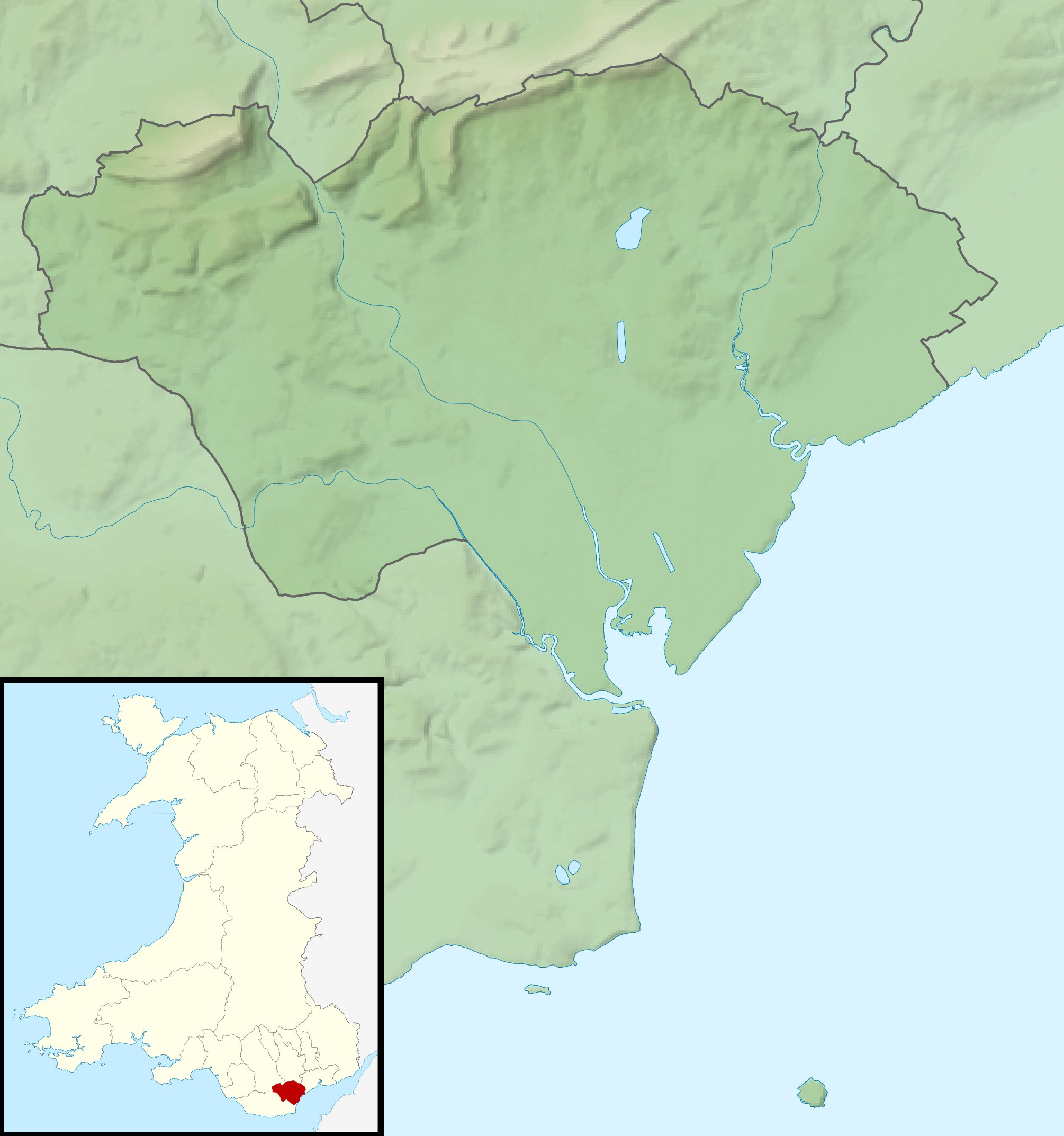
- Location in Cardiff
- 51.537397°N 3.223697°W
- Type: hillfort
- Location: Cardiff, Wales
- OS grid reference: ST 1522 8276

Scheduled monument
- Official name: Wenallt Camp
- Reference no.: GM097

Wenallt Camp, also known as Wenallt Enclosure, is an Iron Age enclosure on the southern slope of Wenallt Hill near Rhiwbina in Cardiff, Wales. The site is sometimes classified as a hillfort. The camp is a scheduled monument.

The camp is a fairly rectangular oval measuring 60 metres (200 ft) north to south by 38 metres (125 ft) protected by a bank and ditch about 12 metres (40 ft) wide and 15 cm (6 in) high. There is an entrance to the south-east, and there are traces of an external stone revetment. Near the middle of the enclosure is a levelled terrace about 7.5 metres (25 ft) in diameter which may have been the site of a hut. The site would have given views across the Cardiff area and over the Bristol Channel.

The camp lies in an area of semi-natural ancient woodland called The Wenallt, which is a popular site for visitors.
