= Wenallt =

Village in Ceredigion, Wales

Coordinates: 52.328289°N 3.945994°W

- Location within Ceredigion
- OS grid reference: SN 6748 7180
- Community: Trawsgoed
- Principal area: Ceredigion
- Country: Wales
- Sovereign state: United Kingdom
- Post town: Aberystwyth
- Postcode district: SY23
- Police: Dyfed-Powys
- Fire: Mid and West Wales
- Ambulance: Welsh
- UK Parliament: Ceredigion Preseli
- Senedd Cymru – Welsh Parliament: Ceredigion

Wenallt is a hamlet in the community of Trawsgoed, Ceredigion, Wales, 10 miles (16 km) southeast of Aberystwyth. Wenallt is represented in the Senedd by Elin Jones (Plaid Cymru) and is part of the Ceredigion Preseli constituency in the House of Commons.

== See also ==
- Gallt y Wenallt - a subsidiary summit of Y Lliwedd in Snowdonia National Park
- List of localities in Wales by population
