= Wellow, Isle of Wight =

Coordinates: 50.692°N 1.454°W

Wellow
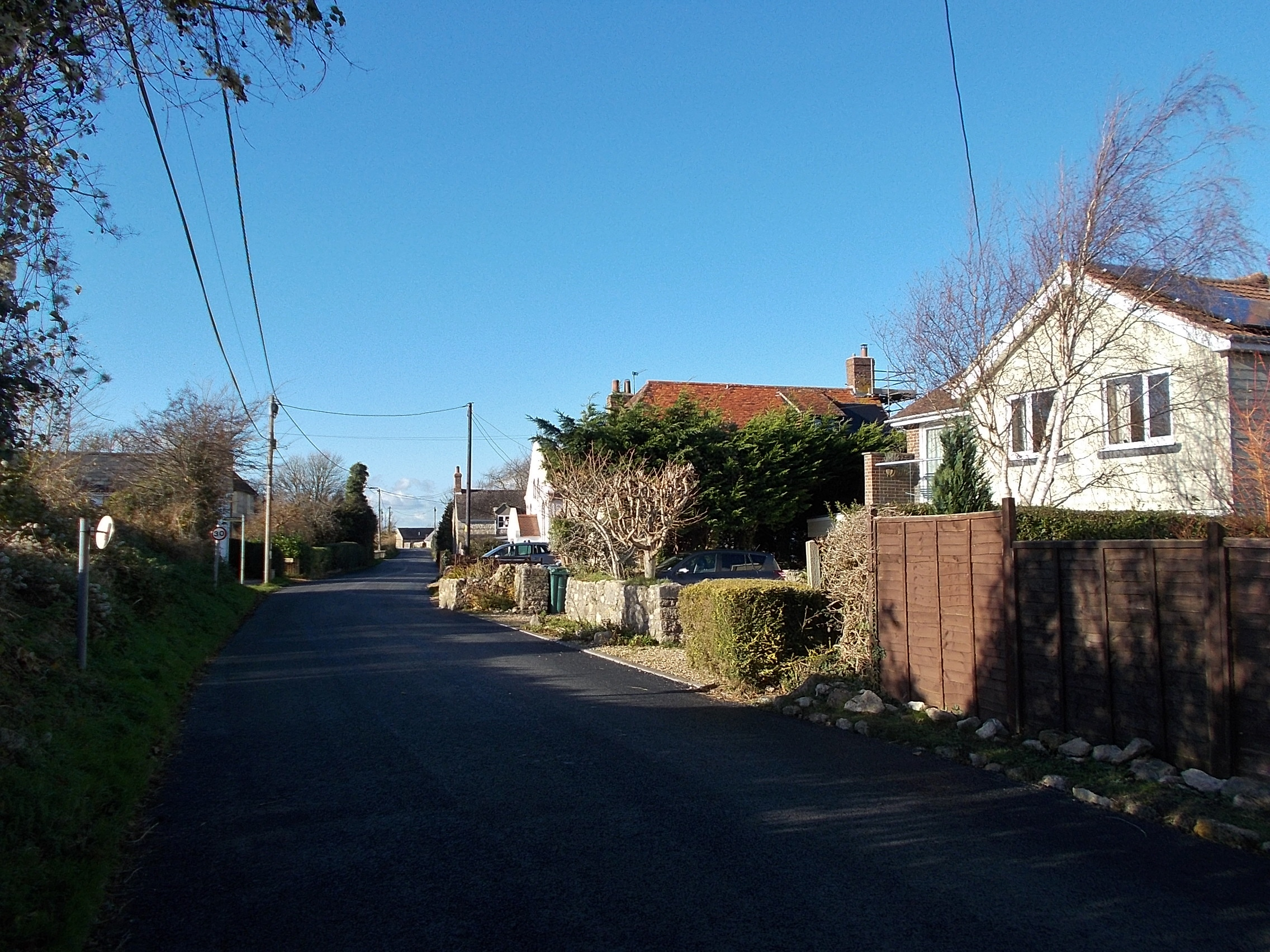

- Location within the Isle of Wight
- OS grid reference: SZ386882
- Civil parish: Shalfleet
- Unitary authority: Isle of Wight
- Ceremonial county: Isle of Wight
- Region: South East
- Country: England
- Sovereign state: United Kingdom
- Post town: YARMOUTH
- Postcode district: PO41
- Dialling code: 01983
- Police: Hampshire and Isle of Wight
- Fire: Hampshire and Isle of Wight
- Ambulance: Isle of Wight
- UK Parliament: Isle of Wight West

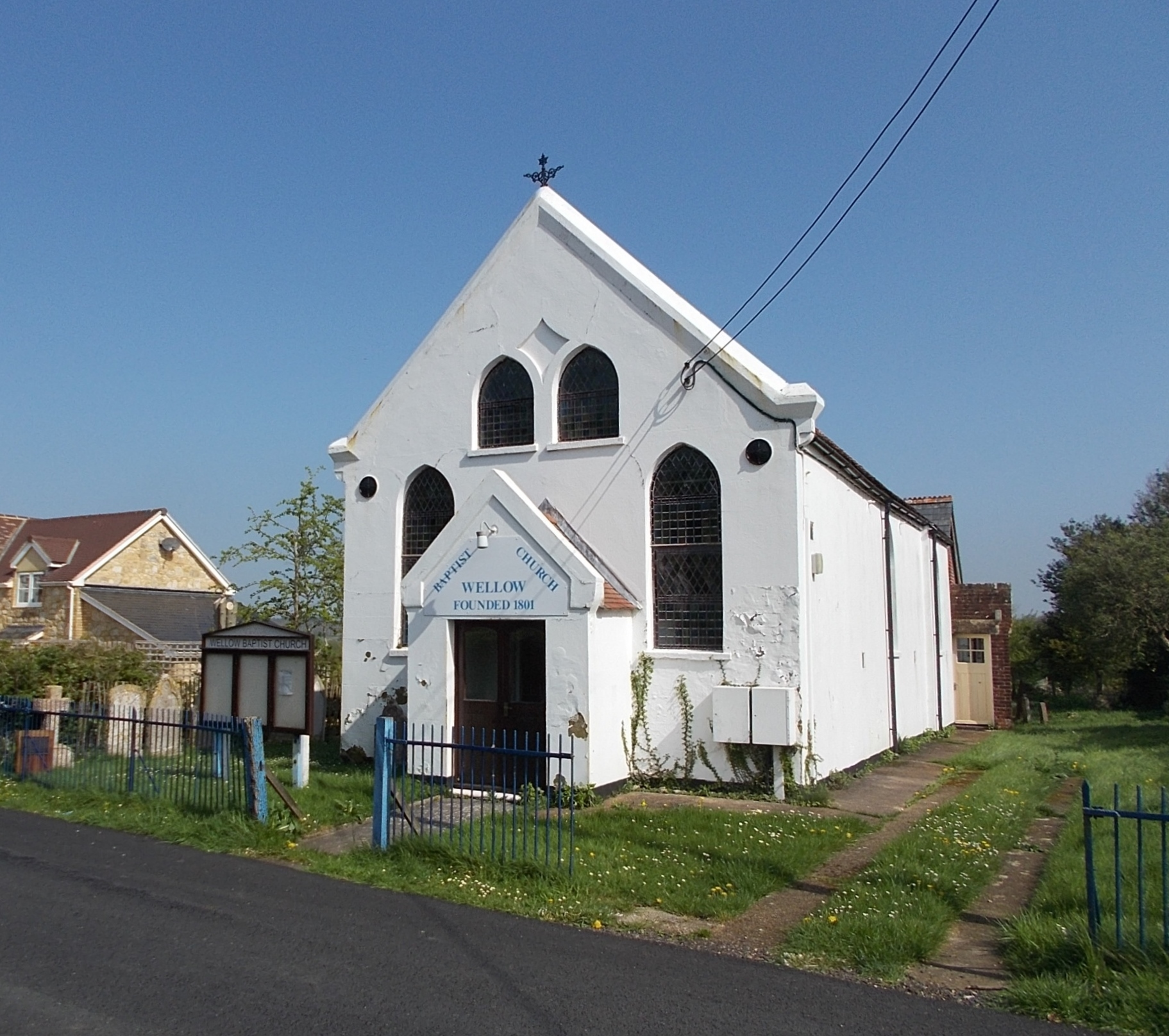
Wellow Baptist Church

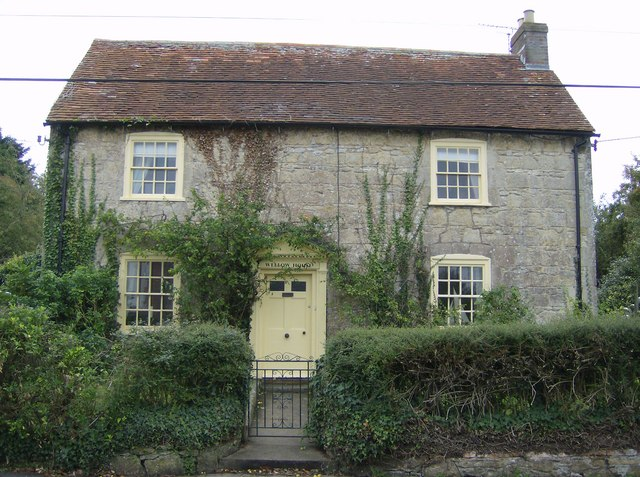
A house in Wellow

Wellow is a village in the civil parish of Shalfleet, on the Isle of Wight, England. It is located about two miles east of Yarmouth in the northwest of the island. The name is believed to be of Jutish origin. Recently a proposal to erect a wind farm was rejected after a high-profile protest campaign. Located within Wellow are a small chapel, post office, vineyard and several farms including Mattingley and Manor Farm. The Hamstead trail runs through Wellow.

== Name ==
The name means '(the place at) the willow tree', from Old English welig. After more than 11 centuries, there are still willows in the village.

~880: Welig

1086 (Domesday Book): Welige

1189-1204: Waleia

1242: Welewe

1439: Welowe

== Transport ==
Public transport is provided by buses on Southern Vectis route 7.

== Places of interest ==
The Headquarters of West Wight Alpacas is situated in Wellow. The Wellow Literary Institute is over 100 years old; originally created as a library for local people it had lain empty for some years in the 1980s until local people heard of plans to demolish it and it is now a community hall with many local events.
