= Gallt y Wenallt =

Mountain in North Wales

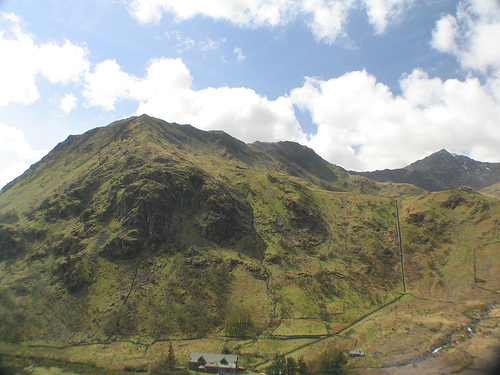
- Gallt y Wenallt with Snowdon (right)

Highest point
- Elevation: 619 m (2,031 ft)
- Prominence: 24 m (79 ft)
- Parent peak: Y Lliwedd
- Listing: Nuttall, Sub-Hewitt
- Coordinates: 53.0593°N 4.0271°W

Naming
- Language of name: Welsh

Geography
- Location: Gwynedd, Wales
- Parent range: Snowdonia
- OS grid: SH622533
- Topo map: OS Landranger 115

Gallt y Wenallt is a subsidiary summit of Y Lliwedd in Snowdonia National Park, north Wales. It lies at the end of the north ridge. Its northern face is reputed to be the longest slope in Snowdonia, being close to 2000 ft. It is also the last nail in the "completist's" Snowdon Horseshoe.

The summit is grassy and is marked with a small cairn. In clear visibility, the view down to Llyn Gwynant is regarded as one of the finest in Snowdonia.

It is the resting place of famous oil man and sailor, Emrys Nye Hughes.
