= Caernarfonshire =

Historic county of Wales

Caernarfonshire Sir Gaernarfon (Welsh)
- Historic county
- 1536–1974
- Flag of Caernarfonshire adopted in 2012

- Area
  - 1831: 370,273 acres (1,498.44 km^{2})
  - 1911: 365,986 acres (1,481.09 km^{2})
  - 1961: 364,108 acres (1,473.49 km^{2})
- Population
  - 1831: 66,448
  - 1911: 125,043
  - 1961: 121,767
- Density
  - 1831: 0.2/acre
  - 1911: 0.3/acre
  - 1961: 0.3/acre
- Status: Shire county under Justiciar of North Wales (1284–1536); Non-administrative county (1536–1889); Administrative county (1889–1974); Historic county (non-administrative)
- Chapman code: CAE
- Government: Carnarvonshire County Council (1889–1926); Caernarvonshire County Council (1926–1974)
  - HQ: County Hall, Caernarfon
  - Motto: Cadernid Gwynedd (The strength of Gwynedd)
- Coat of arms of Caernarvonshire County Council
- History
  - First established by Statute of Rhuddlan: 1284
  - Established: 1536
  - Council established: 1889
  - Disestablished: 1974
Succeeded by
Gwynedd

Caernarfonshire (/kərˈnɑːrvənʃər/; Welsh: Sir Gaernarfon, Welsh pronunciation: [ˈsir gaɨ̯rˈnarvɔn]), previously spelled Caernarvonshire or Carnarvonshire, was one of the thirteen counties of Wales that existed from 1536 until their abolition in 1974. It was located in the north-west of Wales.

== Geography ==
The county was bounded to the north by the Irish Sea, to the east by Denbighshire, to the south by Cardigan Bay and Merionethshire, and to the west by Caernarfon Bay and the Menai Strait, which separated it from Anglesey.

The county was largely mountainous. A large part of the Snowdonian Range lay in the centre and south-east of the former county, which included Snowdon itself, the highest mountain in Wales at 1,085 m (3,560 ft). The south-west of the county was formed by the Llŷn peninsula, with Bardsey Island lying off its western end. The north of the county, between the mountains and Menai Strait, had much more subdued relief. The east of the county was part of Vale of Conwy, with the River Conwy forming much of the eastern boundary. Llandudno and Creuddyn formed a small peninsula to the north-east across the Conwy estuary.

The county included the city of Bangor and the towns and villages of Betws-y-Coed, Caernarfon, Conwy, Llandudno, Porthmadog and Pwllheli.

== History ==
=== Creation ===
The county was originally created under the terms of the Statute of Rhuddlan in 1284 following Edward I of England's conquest of the Principality of Wales and included the cantrefi of: Llŷn, Arfon, Arllechwedd and the commote of Eifionydd (the northern portion of Dunoding).

The county was divided into ten hundreds based on the existing Welsh commotes: Cymydmaen (anglicised as Commitmaen), Creuddyn, Dinllaen, Eifionydd (Evionydd), Cafflogion (Gaflogion), Llechwedd Isaf (...Isav), Llechwedd Uchaf (...Uchav), Nant Conwy (Nant-Conway), Is Gwyrfai (Isgorvai) and Uwch Gwyrfai (Uchgorvai).

=== 19th and 20th centuries ===
During the 19th century the population increased steadily, from 46,000 in the 1801 census, to 81,093 in 1841, and up to 137,000 in the 1901 census (figures given for the registration county).

=== Governance ===
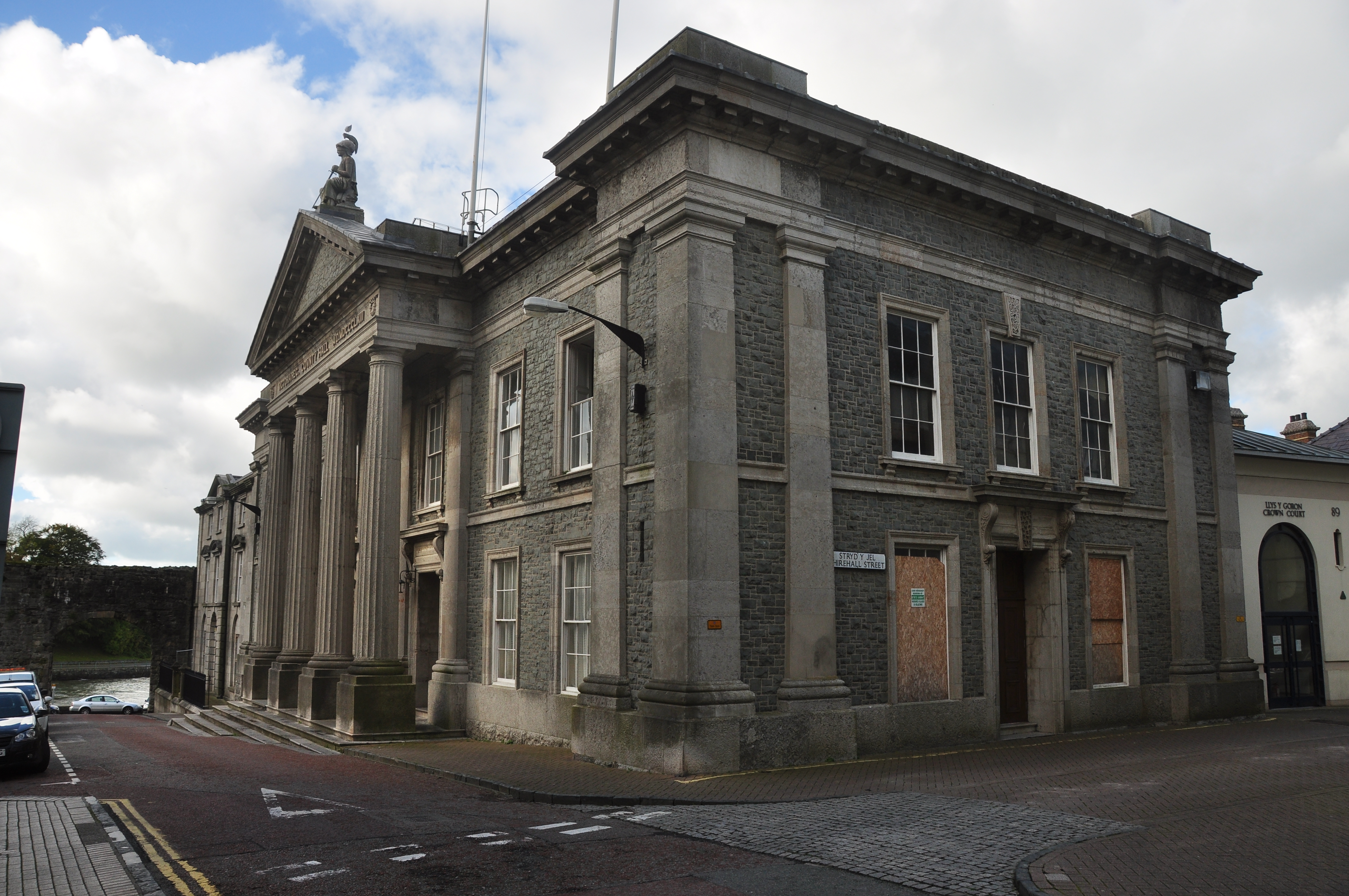
County Hall, Caernarfon

In 1889, elected county councils were established under the Local Government Act 1888, taking over administrative functions previously performed by unelected magistrates at the county's quarter sessions. The 1888 act also adjusted county boundaries where urban sanitary districts straddled county boundaries to place each such district wholly in one county. Caernarfonshire therefore ceded its part of the Colwyn Bay and Colwyn district to Denbighshire.

The county and the town after which it was named were officially spelled "Carnarvon" until 1926. At a meeting on 10 November 1925 the borough council resolved to ask the county council to change the spelling to "Caernarvon". The county council gave permission for the change of spelling for the name of the borough with effect from 14 January 1926, and at the same time decided to ask the government to also change the spelling of the county's name to Caernarvon. The government confirmed the change in the spelling of the county's name with effect from 1 July 1926.

The county council was based at County Hall, Caernarfon.

The county contained five ancient boroughs. Two of these (Caernarfon and Pwllheli) were reformed by the Municipal Corporations Act 1835. Criccieth established a special body of commissioners in 1873. Conwy (then called Conway in English) was reformed to become a municipal borough in 1877. The remaining borough, the City of Bangor was not reformed until 1883.

Under the Public Health Act 1848 and the Local Government Act 1858 a number of towns were created local board districts or local government districts respectively, with local boards to govern their areas. Other towns became improvement commissioners' districts by acts of Parliament. In 1872 these, along with the municipal boroughs, became urban sanitary districts. At the same time the remainder of the county was divided into rural sanitary districts, some of which crossed county boundaries. The Local Government Act 1894 redesignated these as urban and rural districts. A county review order in 1934 made changes to the county's districts.

Sanitary district 1872–1894	County district 1894–1934	Changes 1934–1974
City of Bangor (municipal borough)	City of Bangor (municipal borough)	Absorbed part of Ogwen RD 1934
Bangor RSD (part)	Ogwen RD	Lost territory to Bangor MB, Nant Conway RD 1934
Bethesda ICD (1854), LGD (1863)	Bethesda UD	None
Carnarvon municipal borough	Renamed Caernarvon in 1926	None
Carnarvon RSD (part)	Gwyrfai RD	Absorbed part of Glaslyn RD 1934
Conway municipal borough	Conway municipal borough	Municipal borough created 1877. Absorbed part of Conway RD.
Conway RSD	Conway RD	Abolished 1934
Criccieth ICD (1873)	Criccieth UD	Absorbed part of Glaslyn RD 1934
Festiniog RSD	Glaslyn RD	Abolished 1934
Llandudno ICD (1874)	Llandudno UD	Absorbed part of Conway RD 1934
Llanfairfechan LGD (1872)	Llanfairfechan UD	None
Llanrwst RSD (part)	Geirionydd RD	Formed Nant Conway RD by amalgamation with parts of Conway RD, Ogwen RD
Llanrwst RSD (part)	1898: Bettws-y-Coed UD	None
Penmaenmawr LGD (1866)	Penmaenmawr UD	None
Pwllheli municipal borough	Pwllheli municipal borough	None
Pwllheli RSD	Lleyn RD	Absorbed part of Glaslyn RD 1934
Ynyscynhaiarn LBD (1858)	Ynyscynhaiarn UD renamed Porthmadog UD 1915	Absorbed part of Glaslyn RD 1934

The civil parish of Llysfaen was a detached exclave of the county. On 1 April 1923 Llysfaen was transferred to the county of Denbighshire.

Under the Local Government Act 1972 the administrative county of Caernarvonshire was abolished on 1 April 1974. It was largely split between the three districts of Aberconwy, Arfon and Dwyfor of Gwynedd (along with Merionethshire and Anglesey). Until 1974, Caernarvonshire was divided into civil parishes for the purpose of local government; these in large part equated to ecclesiastical parishes (see the table below), most of which still exist as part of the Church in Wales.

The name Caernarfonshire (this time spelled with an f not a v, following the change of spelling of the town's name from Caernarvon to Caernarfon in 1975) was very briefly revived as part of the name of an administrative area in 1996, when the county of Caernarfonshire and Merionethshire was created. It was, however, renamed Gwynedd almost immediately. Since then Caernarfonshire has been divided between the unitary authorities of Gwynedd to the west and Conwy to the east.

== Ancient parishes ==
Sixty-eight parishes lay entirely within Carnarvonshire, and five more (Llandrillo, Eglwysbach, Llanrwst, Ysbyty Ifan and Beddgelert) straddled the boundary. The county also contained two extra-parochial areas: Maenan Abbey and Bardsey Island.

=== Table ===
The table below lists these ancient parishes and extra-parochial areas by hundred, or (to use the Welsh term) commote. It is a simplification, because in reality some parishes lay in more than one hundred. The hundred that is given here for each parish is generally that in which the parish church was situated. A map can be found at File:WalesCommotesMap.png.

Hundred	Parish numbers in the map below	Parishes
Commitmaen (Cymydmaen)	64-73	Aberdaron • Bodferin • Bryncroes • Llandegwning • Llanengan • Llanfaelrhys • Llangwnnadl • Meyllteyrn • Penllech • Rhiw
Creuddyn	1-5	Eglwysrhos • Llandrillo (township of Eirias only) • Llandudno • Llangystennin • Llysfaen
Dinlaen (Dinllaen)	47-56, 75	Abererch • Bardsey Island (extra-parochial) • Boduan • Ceidio • Edern • Llandudwen • Llaniestyn • Llannor • Nefyn • Pistyll • Tudweiliog
Evionydd (Eifionydd)	37-46	Beddgelert (part) • Criccieth • Dolbenmaen • Llanarmon • Llanfihangel-y-Pennant • Llangybi • Llanystumdwy • Penmorfa • Treflys • Ynyscynhaiarn
Gafflogian (Cafflogion)	57-63	Botwnnog • Carnguwch • Denio • Llanbedrog • Llanfihangel Bachellaeth • Llangian • Penrhos
Isav (Arlechwedd Isaf)	6-11, 74	Caerhun • Conwy • Eglwysbach (township of Maenan only) • Gyffin • Llanbedr-y-Cennin (incl. township of Dolgarrog) • Llangelynnin • The Abbey (extra-parochial)
Isgorvai (Arfon Is Gwyrfai)	24-31	Bangor • Betws Garmon • Llanbeblig • Llanberis • Llanddeiniolen • Llanfaglan • Llanfair-Is-Gaer • Llanrug
Nantconway (Nant Conwy)	12-18	Betws-y-coed • Dolwyddelan • Llanrhychwyn • Llanrwst (township of Gwydir only) • Penmachno • Trefriw • Ysbyty Ifan (township of Eidda only)
Uchav (Arlechwedd Uchaf)	19-23	Abergwyngregyn • Dwygyfylchi • Llandygai • Llanfairfechan • Llanllechid
Uchgorvai (Arfon Uwch Gwyrfai)	32-36	Clynnog Fawr • Llanaelhaiarn • Llandwrog • Llanllyfni • Llanwnda

=== Map ===
Carnarvonshire ancient parishes (until 1894), coloured by hundred. Key: (1) Llandudno (2) Llanrhos (3) Llangystennin (4) part of Llandrillo-yn-Rhos; separate parish of Eirias from 1866 (5) Llysfaen (6) Conwy (7) Gyffin (8) Llangelynnin (9) Llanbedr-y-Cennin (9a) Dolgarrog (township of Llanbedr-y-Cennin) (10) Caerhun (11) part of Eglwysbach; separate parish of Maenan from 1866 (12) Llanrhychwyn (13) Trefriw (14) part of Llanrwst; separate parish of Gwydir from 1866 (15) Betws-y-Coed (16) Dolwyddelan (17) Penmachno (18) part of Ysbyty Ifan; separate parish of Eidda from 1866 (19) Dwygyfylchi (20) Llanfairfechan (21) Abergwyngregyn (22) Llanllechid (23) Llandygai (24) Bangor (25) Llanfair-is-gaer (26) Llanddeiniolen (27) Llanfaglan (28) Llanbeblig (29) Llanrug (30) Llanberis (31) Betws Garmon (32) Llanwnda (33) Llandwrog (34) Llanllyfni (35) Clynnog (36) Llanaelhaearn (37) part of Beddgelert (38) Llanfihangel-y-Pennant (until 1888) (39) Dolbenmaen (included areas of 38 and 40 from 1888) (40) Penmorfa (until 1888) (41) Ynyscynhaearn (42) Treflys (43) Criccieth (44) Llanystumdwy (45) Llangybi (46) Llanarmon (47) Pistyll (48) Abererch (49) Llannor (50) Bodfean (51) Nefyn (52) Ceidio (53) Edern (54) Tudweiliog (55) Llandudwen (56) Llaniestyn (57) Carnguwch (58) Denio (59) Penrhos (60) Llanfihangel Bachellaeth (61) Llanbedrog (62) Botwnnog (63) Llangian (64) Penllech (65) Meyllteyrn (66) Llangwnnadl (67) Bryncroes (68) Rhiw (until 1888) (69) Llandegwning (70) Llanengan (71) Bodferin (72) Llanfaelrhys (merged with 68 to form Rhiw with Llanfaelrhys from 1888) (73) Aberdaron (74) The Abbey (extra-parochial until 1858) (75) Bardsey Island (extra-parochial)

== Parishes 1894-1934 ==
Parishes in 1900, showing changes after the reforms of 1894. Coloration refers to the rural and urban districts tabulated above. Key: (1) Llandudno (2) Eglwysrhos (3) Llanrhos (4) Conwy (5) Gyffin (6) Penrhyn (7) Llangystennin (8) Llechwedd (9) Llangelynnin (10) Caerhun (11) Llanbedr-y-Cennin (12) Dolgarrog (13) Llysfaen (transferred to Denbighshire 1923) (14) The Abbey (15) Maenan (16) Trefriw (17) Llanrhychwyn (18) Trewydir (abolished 1904) (19) Dolwyddelan (20) Penmachno (21) Eidda (22) Betws-y-Coed (23) Dwygyfylchi (24) Llanfairfechan (25) Abergwyngregyn (26) Llanllechid (27) Llandygai (28) Pentir (29) Bethesda (30) Bangor (31) Llanfair-is-gaer (32) Llanddeiniolen (33) Llanrug (34) Llanberis (35) Waunfawr (36) Llanfaglan (37) Llanwnda (38) Betws Garmon (39) Llandwrog (40) Llanllyfni (41) Clynnog (42) Llanbeblig (43) Beddgelert (44) Dolbenmaen (45) Treflys (46) Ynyscynhaearn (47) Criccieth (48) Penllyn (49) Llanystumdwy (50) Llanaelhaearn (51) Llangybi (52) Llanarmon (53) Abererch (54) Carnguwch (55) Pistyll (56) Llannor (57) Nefyn (58) Bodfean (59) Penrhos (60) Edern (61) Ceidio (62) Llanfihangel Bachellaeth (63) Llanbedrog (64) Tudweiliog (65) Llandudwen (66) Llaniestyn (67) Llangian (68) Penllech (69) Meyllteyrn (70) Botwnnog (71) Llandegwning (72) Llanengan (73) Llangwnnadl (74) Bryncroes (75) Rhiw with Llanfaelrhys (76) Bodferin (77) Aberdaron (78) Bardsey Island (79) Denio

== Parishes 1934-74 ==
Parishes after the County Review Order, effective 1934, abolished many smaller parishes. Coloration refers to the rural and urban districts tabulated above. Key: (1) Llandudno-cum-Eglwysrhos (2) Conwy (3) Gyffin (4) Llanrhos (5) Henryd (6) Caerhun (7) Llanbedr-y-Cennin (8) Dolgarrog (9) The Abbey (10) Maenan (11) Trefriw (12) Llanrhychwyn (13) Capel Curig (created 1904) (14) Dolwyddelan (15) Penmachno (16) Eidda (17) Betws-y-Coed (18) Dwygyfylchi (19) Llanfairfechan (20) Abergwyngregyn (21) Llanllechid (22) Llandygai (23) Pentir (24) Bethesda (25) Bangor (26) Llanfair-is-gaer (27) Llanddeiniolen (28) Llanrug (29) Llanberis (30) Waunfawr (31) Llanfaglan (32) Llanwnda (33) Llandwrog (34) Llanllyfni (35) Clynnog (36) Betws Garmon (37) Beddgelert (38) Llanbeblig (39) Ynyscynhaearn (40) Criccieth (41) Dolbenmaen (42) Llanystumdwy (43) Llanaelhaearn (44) Pistyll (45) Llannor (46) Nefyn (47) Buan (48) Llanbedrog (49) Tudweiliog (50) Botwnnog (51) Aberdaron (52) Llanengan (53) Bardsey Island (54) Denio

== Coat of arms ==
Caernarvonshire County Council received a grant of armorial bearings from the College of Arms in 1949. The shield was a combination of the arms of two great native Princes of Wales. The gold and red quarters bearing lions were the arms of Llewelyn the Last – now used as the arms of the Principality of Wales. Across this was placed a green fess or horizontal band, on which were three gold eagles, from the arms of Owain Gwynedd. According to the poet Michael Drayton, the eagles formed the device on the banner of the Caernarvonshire soldiers at the Battle of Agincourt. The crest above the shield was a generic castle, representing Caernarfon, Conwy and Criccieth Castles. Behind the castle was the badge of the heir apparent: three ostrich feathers. The supporters were Welsh dragons with fish tails to show that Caernarvonshire was a Welsh maritime county. The supporter stood on a compartment of rocks for the rugged coast and mountains of the county. The motto Cadernid Gwynedd was adopted by the county council. This was derived from the Mabinogion, and can be translated as "The Strength of Gwynedd".

== Legacy ==
=== Flag ===
The Flag of Caernarfonshire was registered with the Flag Institute in March 2012. The pattern of three gold eagles on a green background is a design with a long association with the county, having reputedly been flown by Caernarfonshire soldiers at the Battle of Agincourt in 1415.

== Places of interest ==
- Bangor Cathedral
- Ynys Enlli / Bardsey Island (grid reference SH1221);
- Caernarfon Castle (grid reference SH4762);
- Conwy Castle (grid reference SH7877);
- Criccieth Castle (grid reference SH5000837754);
- Great Orme Tramway (grid reference SH7883);
- Gwydir Castle, nr. Llanrwst (grid reference SH7961);
- Penrhyn Castle (grid reference SH6071);
- Swallow Falls, Betws-y-Coed (grid reference SH7657);
- Snowdon Mountain Railway, Llanberis (grid reference SH5859);
- Ty Mawr Wybrnant (grid reference SH7752).

== See also ==
- Lord Lieutenant of Carnarvonshire – chronological list of Lords Lieutenant of Caernarvonshire
- List of High Sheriffs of Caernarvonshire
- Custos Rotulorum of Caernarvonshire – chronological list of Custodes rotulorum of Caernarvonshire
- Sheriff of Caernarvonshire – chronological list of Sheriffs of Caernarvonshire
- Caernarvonshire (UK Parliament constituency) – chronological list of MPs for former Caernarvonshire constituency
- Unitary Authorities of Wales

== Bibliography ==
- A.H. Dodd, The History of Caernarvonshire (Caernarfonshire Historical Society, 1968).
- John Jones, Enwau Lleoedd Sir Gaernarfon (Caernarfon, 1913). Origin and meanings of place names in the county.
