= Buan, Gwynedd =

Buan
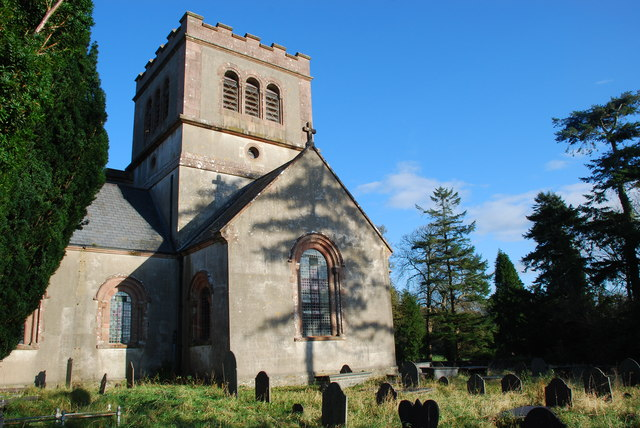
- St Buan's Church in Boduan

- Location within Gwynedd
- Population: 484 (2011)
- OS grid reference: SH3237
- Community: Buan
- Principal area: Gwynedd
- Preserved county: Gwynedd
- Country: Wales
- Sovereign state: United Kingdom
- Post town: PWLLHELI
- Postcode district: LL53
- Dialling code: 01758
- Police: North Wales
- Fire: North Wales
- Ambulance: Welsh
- UK Parliament: Dwyfor Meirionnydd
- Senedd Cymru – Welsh Parliament: Gwynedd Maldwyn
- List of places UK Wales Gwynedd 52.911°N 4.492°W Map of the community

Buan is a community in the Welsh county of Gwynedd, located on the Llŷn Peninsula. It includes the villages of Boduan and Rhydyclafdy, and has a population of 469, increasing to 484 at the 2011 Census. Other settlements include Ceidio, Llandudwen and Llanfihangel Bachellaeth.

== History ==
In 1870–72 the Imperial Gazetteer of England and Wales by John Marius Wilson described Buan as:

BODVEAN, or Bodfaen, a parish in Pwllheli district, Carnarvon; 2½ miles SE of Nevin, and 4 WNW of Pwllheli r. station. It has a post office under Pwllheli. Acres, 2,572. Real property, £1,434. Pop., 382. Houses, 84. The property is divided between two. Bodvean Hall is the seat of Lord Newborough. The living is a rectory in the diocese of Bangor. Value, £198. Patron, the Bishop of Bangor. The church is modern, and has monuments of the Wynnes. There are a Calvinistic Methodist chapel, and a slightly endowed school.

== Geography and demographics ==
Buan is located in the south-western central part of Gwynedd on the Llŷn Peninsula, in North West Wales, and includes the villages of Boduan and Rhydyclafdy. The landscape is dominated by farms and woodland. According to the 2011 census, the community of Buan had a population of 484 people (250 males and 234 females). In addition, there are 195 households in the community with a population density of 0.1 per hectare. Buan is situated near the Corn Bodvean hill, and its nearest town is Nefyn which is located approximately 1-mile (1.6 km) south of the community.

Christianity was the majority religion in the area with two people stating they followed other religions. Of Buan's 484 residents, 84.1% described their health as either "good" or "very good", and of those aged between 16 and over, 18.8% had no academic qualifications or one GCSE, lower than the figures for all of Gwynedd (23.2%) and Wales (25.9%).

The community includes the Marilyn and hill fort of Garn Boduan.

== Governance ==
In local government Buan is governed by Gwynedd Council, and is in the Efailnewydd/Buan ward, which is part of the Dwyfor electoral district. At the national level Buan is in the Welsh parliamentary constituency of Dwyfor Meirionnydd, for which Liz Saville Roberts (Plaid Cymru) has been MP since 2015. In the general election of 2015 Saville Roberts won 11,790 votes (40.9%), giving her a majority of 5,261; the Conservative Party won 6,550 (22.7%) and the Labour Party won 3,904 votes (13.5%), while the United Kingdom Independence Party took 3,126 votes (10.8%). The Independent candidate Louise Hughes, the Liberal Democrats and the Green Party each won fewer than 2,000 votes, Hughes performed slightly better of all three. In the Senedd Buan is in the constituency of Dwyfor Meirionnydd for which Dafydd Elis-Thomas has been the Member of the Senedd since its creation in 2007.

== Education ==
Ysgol Rhydyclafdy School was the only primary school in the community and closed in 2008 due to a falling number in pupils and as part of a programme that saw two additional schools being closed on the Llŷn Peninsula. Gwynedd Council allowed the building to be reopened as a nursery with community facilities two years later.

== Notable landmarks ==
Listed buildings and landmarks in Buan, Gwynedd

The following are the listed buildings in Buan. The listings are graded:

- AA Telephone Box (II)
- Bryniau (II)
- Bryntirion (II)
- Capel Rhydyclafdy (II)
- Cefniwrch (II)
- Church of St Buan (II)
- Church of St Ceidio (II)
- Church of St Michael (II)
- Church of St Tudwen (II*)
- Direction Sign at Inkerman Bridge (II) - Delisted in October 2022
- E Farmyard Range including water-wheel at Nant Farm (II)
- Efail Gledrydd (II)
- Efail Gledrydd Forge (II)
- Gallt-y-beren (II)
- Glanrafon (II)
- Gwnhinger (II)
- Lodge to N of Plas Boduan (II)
- Lychgate and churchyard wall to Church of St Tudwen (II)
- Madryn Castle Gatehouse (II)
- Meillionen Farmhouse (II)
- Milestone by Tuhwnt i'r Gors (II)
- Nant Farm (II)
- Neuadd Bogdadle (II)
- No 1 Tan-y-fron (II)
- No 3 Tan-y-fron (II)
- Out-buildings at Home Farm, Plas Boduan (II)
- Penhyddgan (II*)
- Plas Boduan (II)
- Pont Rhydyclafdy (II)
- Roadsign SE of Bogdadle (II)
- S Farmyard Range at Nant Farm (II)
- The Cock-loft (II)
- Ty Capel Rhydyclafdy (II)
- Ty Isaf (NW Cottage) (II)
- Ty Isaf (SE Cottage) (II)
- Tyn-y-coed Isaf (II)

Buan contains 34 Grade II listed buildings, in addition to two Grade II* listed buildings. The former church of the same name, St Buan, was built in 1765, and is reminiscent of the Romanesque style in design. The church was later deconsecrated and sold in 2004.
