= Rhydyclafdy =

Coordinates: 52.886°N 4.486°W

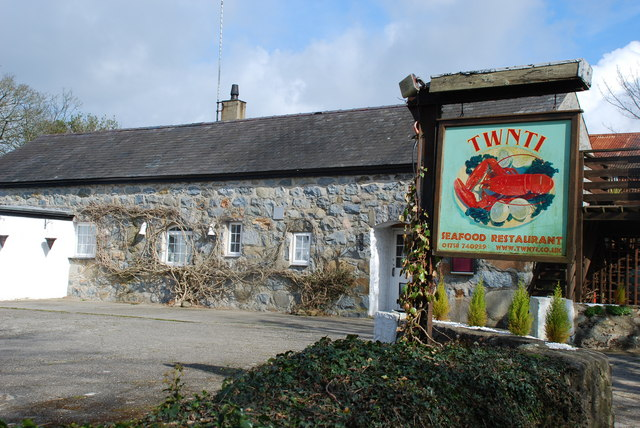
- The Twnti restaurant in the village

- Location within Gwynedd
- Population: 469 (2001)
- OS grid reference: SH327349
- Community: Buan
- Principal area: Gwynedd
- Preserved county: Gwynedd
- Country: Wales
- Sovereign state: United Kingdom
- Post town: PWLLHELI
- Postcode district: LL53
- Dialling code: 01758
- Police: North Wales
- Fire: North Wales
- Ambulance: Welsh
- UK Parliament: Dwyfor Meirionnydd
- Senedd Cymru – Welsh Parliament: Dwyfor Meirionnydd

Rhydyclafdy (or Rhyd-y-clafdy) is a small village close to the southern coast of the Llŷn Peninsula in the Welsh county of Gwynedd. It lies 2.8 miles (4.58 km) to the west of Pwllheli and 19.65 miles (31.62 km) south west of Caernarfon. The village forms part of the community of Buan along with Boduan, and together they have a population of 469.

== Education ==
Primary education was provided by Ysgol Rhydyclafdy, located in the village. The school is in the Ysgol Glan y Môr catchment area, where the majority of students will go on to complete their secondary education. However the school closed down in 2008 and village children have to travel to Llanbedrog or Pentre Uchaf. This has had a marked effect on the village community as the school was always the centre of the village.
