= Llanfair =

Llanfair (Welsh for "St. Mary's Parish") may refer to:

== Places ==
- Llanfair Clydogau; a small village in Mid Wales
- Llanfair, Gwynedd, a village in the Ardudwy area of Gwynedd
- Llanfair-is-gaer, a former parish in Arfon, Gwynedd
- Llanfair, Vale of Glamorgan, a community near Cowbridge
- Llanfair Caereinion, Powys; a small town in east central Wales
- Llanfairpwllgwyngyll, Anglesey; a village and community on the island of Anglesey in Wales
- Llanfair-Nant-Gwyn, hamlet in Pembrokeshire
- Llanfair Dyffryn Clwyd, a village and community in Denbighshire, Wales
- Llanfair, Alabama, USA

== Fiction ==
- Llanfair (One Life to Live), the Lord family mansion on the American soap opera One Life to Live

== Other uses ==
- "Llanfair", a popular Welsh hymn tune; see "Christ the Lord Is Risen Today"
