= Gwyrfai Rural District =

Former local government area in the UK

Gwyrfai
- Area
  - 1901: 70,441 acres (285.06 km^{2})
  - 1934: 96,475 acres (390.42 km^{2})
- Population
  - 1901: 29,838
  - 1971: 21,234
- History
  - Created: 1894
  - Abolished: 1974
  - Succeeded by: Arfon, Dwyfor
- Status: Rural District
  - HQ: Caernarvon

Gwyrfai was a rural district in the administrative county of Caernarvonshire from 1894 to 1974.

== History ==
Named after the Afon Gwyrfai, the district was formed under the Local Government Act 1894, taking over the area of the Carnarvon Rural Sanitary District. The district was abolished in 1974 by the Local Government Act 1972. Beddgelert and Clynnog were included in the district of Dwyfor, with the rest of the rural district becoming part of the Borough of Arfon, both in the new county of Gwynedd.

== Civil parishes ==
- Bettws Garmon
- Clynnog
- Llanberis
- Llanddeineolan
- Llandwrog
- Llanfaglan
- Llanfair is Gaer
- Llanllyfni
- Llanrug
- Llanwnda
- Waun Fawr

In 1934, on the abolition of Glaslyn Rural District, the parish of Beddgelert was added.

== Sources ==
- Census of England and Wales: County Report for Carnarvonshire, 1901, 1911, 1921
- Census of England and Wales: County Report for Caernarvonshire 1931
- Caernarvonshire Administrative County (Vision of Britain)
