= Flag of Caernarfonshire =

Historic flag

Caernarfonshire
- Proportion: 3:5
- Adopted: March 2012
- Design: Vert, three eagles displayed in fess Or
- Designed by: Historic

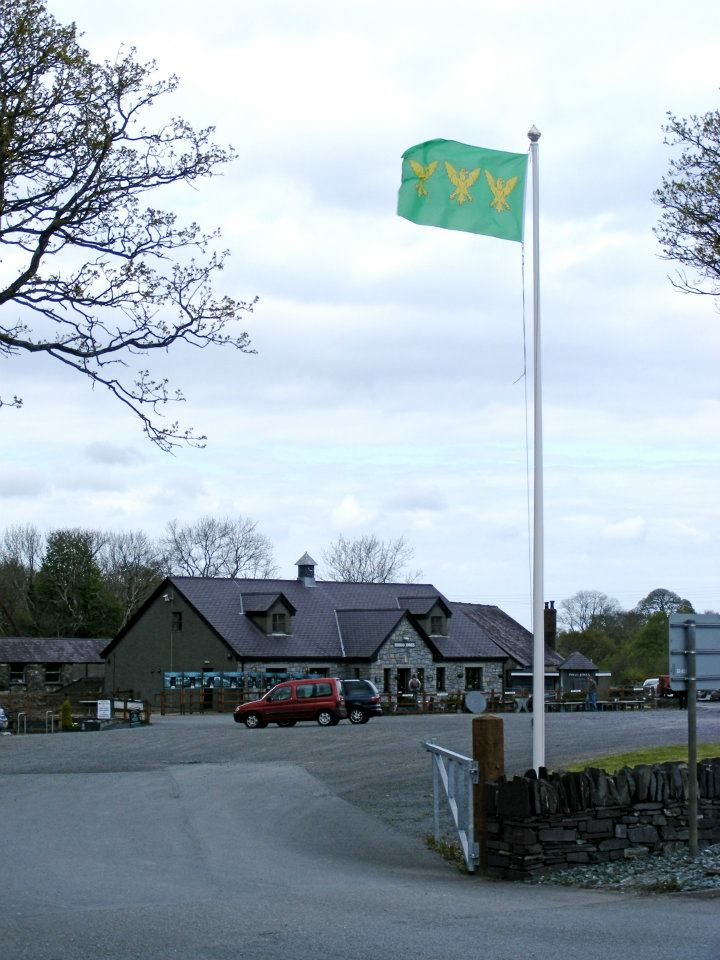
The Caernarfonshire flag flying at Inigo Jones Slate Works, Groeslon

The Caernarfonshire flag (Welsh: Baner Sir Gaernarfon) is the flag of the historic Welsh county of Caernarfonshire. The origins of the emblem of the three eagles arranged in fess on a green field revolve around the ancient King of Gwynedd, Owain Gwynedd, to whom the symbol was attributed as his coat of arms. It was registered with the Flag Institute in March 2012.

== History ==
Owain Gwynedd was born around 1100 and became King of Gwynedd in 1137. In 1415, the Battle of Agincourt was fought in which the Caernarfonshire units were reputed to have fought under a banner of three golden eagles on green in honour of Owain Gwynedd. Michael Drayton records this in his work The Battaile of Agincourt in 1627.

In his 1920 work on county identities Story of the Shire, Frederick Hackwood calls the three golden eagles of Caernarfonshire as an "authentic" and "significant" badge of the county, as well as reciting their association to the Romans of antiquity.

In “The Romance of Heraldry” (1929), the author referenced the eagles as a symbol of Caernarfonshire. The eagles were used thus at the 1969 Investiture of Prince Charles at Caernarfon Castle. The Caernarfonshire council began using the eagles as a symbol and a coat of arms in the 20th century, as did many locally based organisations.

A social media campaign was started due to this use of the symbol across the county for it to be adopted as the official flag. It was supported by several historical societies, and duly registered by the Flag Institute in 2012.

== Design ==
The flag features three yellow eagles arranged in a fess on a green field, originating from a coat of arms attributed to Owain Gwynedd, who was King of Gwynedd (a kingdom which modern-day Caernarfonshire sits within the former borders of) from 1137 to 1170

=== Colours ===
The colours for the flag are:

Colour space	Green	Yellow
Pantone	354c	109c
CMYK	81.0.92.0	0.9.100.0
RGB	0-177-64	255-209-0
HTML	#00B140	#FFD100
