= Glaslyn Rural District =

Former local government district in Wales

Glaslyn
- History
  - Created: 1894
  - Abolished: 1934
  - Succeeded by: Gwyrfai Rural District, Llŷn Rural District, Criccieth Urban District, Porthmadog Urban District
- Status: Rural District

Glaslyn was a rural district in the administrative county of Caernarfonshire from 1894 to 1934.

The district was formed under the Local Government Act 1894 from the part of Festiniog Rural Sanitary District in Caernarfonshire. The district was named after Glaslyn, a lake at the centre of the area.

The district contained three civil parishes:

- Beddgelert
- Dolbenmaen
- Treflys

The rural district was abolished by a County Review Order in 1934. Beddgelert passed to Gwyrfai Rural District, and Dolbenmaen to Llŷn Rural District. Treflys parish was abolished, most of it becoming part of Dolbenmaen parish, with parts going to the urban districts of Criccieth and Porthmadog.

Civil parishes of Glaslyn Rural District in 1900

== Sources ==
- Census of England and Wales: County Report for Carnarvonshire, 1901, 1911, 1921
- Census of England and Wales: County Report for Caernarvonshire 1931
- Caernarvonshire Administrative County (Vision of Britain)
