= Dwyfor =

Former district of Gwynedd, Wales

Coordinates: 52.903°N 4.460°W

- District
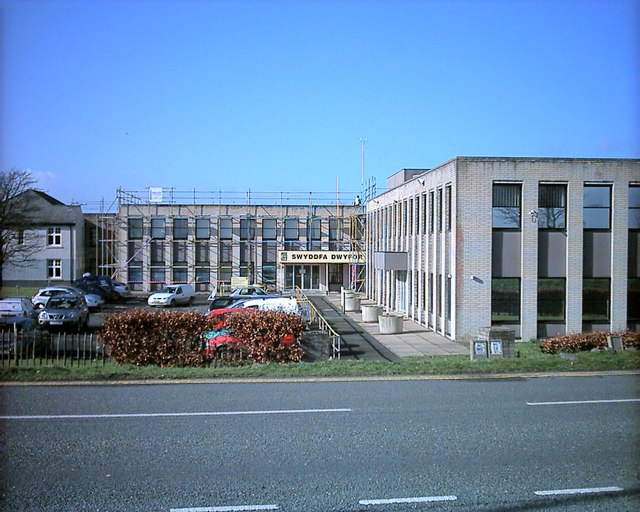
- Council Offices, Embankment Road, Pwllheli

- Dwyfor shown within Wales
- History
  - Created: 1 April 1974
  - Abolished: 31 March 1996
  - Succeeded by: Gwynedd
  - HQ: Pwllheli
- Contained within
  - County Council: Gwynedd

Dwyfor was one of the five local government districts of Gwynedd, Wales from 1974 to 1996, covering the Llŷn peninsula. Its council was based in Pwllheli.

== History ==
The district was created on 1 April 1974, under the Local Government Act 1972. It covered the whole area of four former districts and parts of a fifth from the administrative county of Caernarfonshire, which were all abolished at the same time:

- Beddgelert parish from Gwyrfai Rural District
- Clynnog parish from Gwyrfai Rural District
- Criccieth Urban District
- Llŷn Rural District
- Porthmadog Urban District
- Pwllheli Municipal Borough

The new district was named after the river Dwyfor.

Dwyfor was notable for being the last stronghold of the Sabbatarian temperance movement in Wales. Under the terms of the Licensing Act 1961, local referendums prevented the opening of public houses on Sundays until 1996.

Under the Local Government (Wales) Act 1994, the previous two tier system of counties and districts was replaced with new principal areas (each designated either a "county" or a "county borough"), whose councils perform the functions previously divided between the county and district councils. The Dwyfor area merged with Arfon and Meirionnydd to become a county which the government initially called "Caernarfonshire and Merionethshire". During the transition to the new system, the shadow authority requested a change of name from "Caernarfonshire and Merionethshire" to "Gwynedd". The government confirmed the change with effect from 2 April 1996, one day after the new council came into being.

The Dwyfor area remains in use as an area committee of Gwynedd Council.

== Political control ==
The first election to the council was held in 1973. The council operated as a shadow authority alongside the outgoing authorities until it came into its powers on 1 April 1974. Throughout the council's existence a majority of the seats were held by independents councillors.as follows:

| Party in control | Years |
|---|---|
| Independent | 1974–1996 |

== Premises ==
The council established its main offices on Embankment Road in Pwllheli. After the council's abolition in 1996 the building became an area office of Gwynedd Council.

== See also ==
- Earl Lloyd George of Dwyfor
- Dwyfor Meirionnydd (UK Parliament constituency)
- Dwyfor Meirionnydd (Senedd constituency)
