= Elizabeth Watkin-Jones =

- Elizabeth Watkin-Jones
- Born: 13 July 1877; Nefyn, Wales
- Died: 9 June 1966 (aged 88); Wales
- Occupations: Author, teacher
- Spouse: John Watkin Jones
- Writing career
- Language: English, Welsh
- Genre: Children's

Elizabeth Watkin-Jones (13 July 1887 – 9 June 1966) was a Welsh children's book author, who wrote in the Welsh language.

== Life history ==
Watkin-Jones was born in Nefyn, Caernarfonshire as Elizabeth Parry, the only daughter of Jane and Henry Parry. Henry Parry was a sea captain who drowned in Iquique harbour in Chile without seeing his daughter. Watkin-Jones was educated in the school in Nefyn, Pwllheli county school, and in the Normal College, Bangor. She became an infants teacher and taught in several schools, in South and North Wales, including Aberdare, Onllwyn, Porthmadog, Trefriw and Nefyn . In February 1916 she married John Watkin-Jones, who was also a school teacher. After World War I, she lived for a short time in Merthyr before returning to Nefyn in 1920 after her husband was appointed headteacher there. She died in 1966 and was cremated at Colwyn Bay where her ashes were scattered.

== Writing career ==
Watkin-Jones first wrote stories in the English language for children, published in children's publications such as Chicks' Own and Fairyland Tales. She then turned her hand to writing in Welsh, and between 1939 and 1949 she won many awards at the National Eisteddfod for stories, novels and plays for children. She contributed to several Welsh language magazines, including Tywysydd y Plant, Trysorfa'r Plant (The Children's Treasury), Y Winllan (The Vineyard), Cymru'r Plant, Yr Athro, and especially to the comic Hwyl.

Watkin-Jones wrote five books of short plays for children, including Onesimus (1947) and Pwt a Moi (1953). She also wrote seven novels or historical stories, all for children, between 1939 and 1955, her personal favourite being Plant y Mynachdy (1939). All her novels, with the exception of Y Dryslwyn (1947), were set in the town of Nefyn.

=== Written works ===
- Plant y Mynachdy (1939)
- Luned Bengoch (1946)
- Y Cwlwm Cêl (1947)
- Y Dryslwyn (1947)
- Esyllt (1951)
- Lowri in the collection Storïau Ias a Chyffro (1951)
- Lois (1955)
