= Boduan =

Coordinates: 52°54′40″N 4°29′35″W

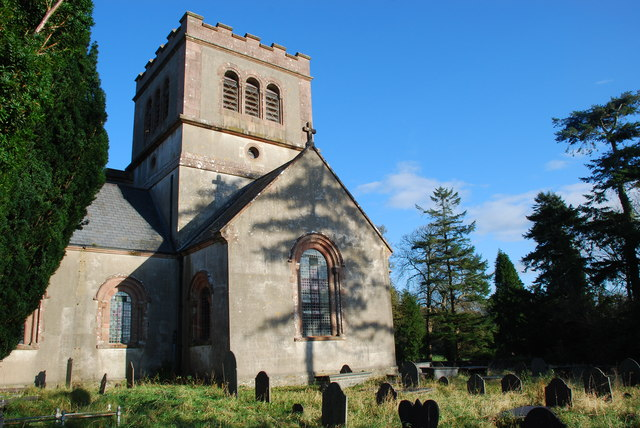
- St Buan's Church

- Location within Gwynedd
- OS grid reference: SH323377
- Community: Buan
- Principal area: Gwynedd
- Country: Wales
- Sovereign state: United Kingdom
- Post town: PWLLHELI
- Postcode district: LL53
- Dialling code: 01758
- Police: North Wales
- Fire: North Wales
- Ambulance: Welsh
- UK Parliament: Dwyfor Meirionnydd
- Senedd Cymru – Welsh Parliament: Gwynedd Maldwyn

Boduan is a village in Gwynedd, Wales, about 4 miles from Pwllheli. It is in the historic county of Caernarfonshire. It was due to host the National Eisteddfod in 2021 but due to the COVID-19 pandemic, instead it hosted the 2023 edition.

Garn Boduan, a hillfort built soon after Roman occupation, is located in the village. Plas Boduan is an 18th-century Grade II listed house, set in a park dating from the 19th century which is designated Grade II on the Cadw/ICOMOS Register of Parks and Gardens of Special Historic Interest in Wales.
