= Llannor =

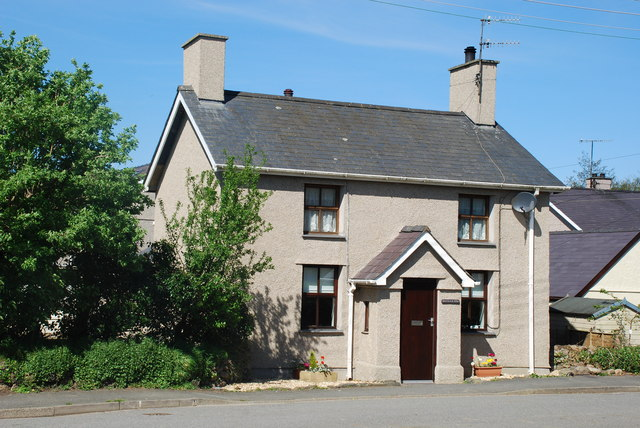
- Dafarn Hir Llannor

- Location within Gwynedd
- Population: 2,145 (2011)
- OS grid reference: SH353373
- Community: Llannor
- Principal area: Gwynedd
- Preserved county: Gwynedd
- Country: Wales
- Sovereign state: United Kingdom
- Post town: PWLLHELI
- Postcode district: LL53
- Dialling code: 01758
- Police: North Wales
- Fire: North Wales
- Ambulance: Welsh
- UK Parliament: Dwyfor Meirionnydd
- Senedd Cymru – Welsh Parliament: Dwyfor Meirionnydd
- List of places UK Wales Gwynedd 52.908°N 4.449°W Map of the community

Llannor (Welsh pronunciation: [ˈɬanɔr]) is a village, parish and community located on the Llŷn Peninsula (Welsh: Penrhyn Llŷn) in the Welsh county of Gwynedd. Historically in Caernarfonshire, it lies 1.7 miles (2.8 km) north of Pwllheli and 18.0 miles (29.0 km) south west of Caernarfon. The community includes the villages of Y Ffor, Abererch, Efailnewydd, Llwyndyrys and Rhos-fawr, and had a population of 2,244 in 2010, reducing slightly to 2,145 at the 2011 Census.

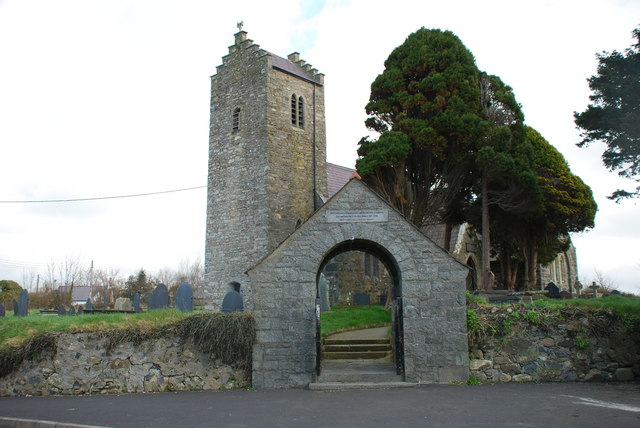
Church of the Holy Cross

The medieval church of the Holy Cross was rebuilt by Henry Kennedy in 1855. Later alterations were made by Harold Hughes in 1905.

It is a grade II* listed building.
