= Penrhyn Du Mines =

Collection of mines near Llanengan, Wales

Coordinates: 52°48′28″N 4°29′33″W

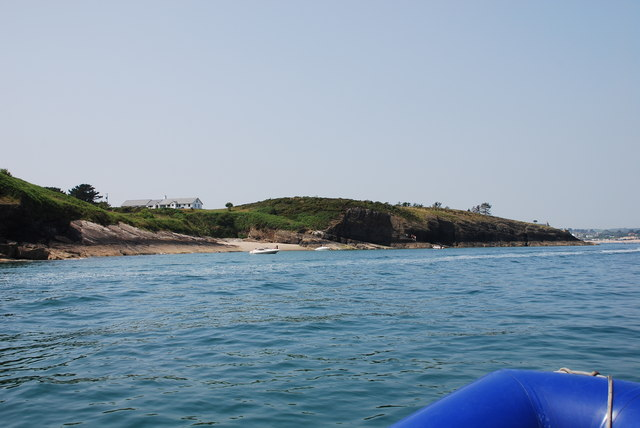
Cornish Row sitting on the Penrhyn Du headland

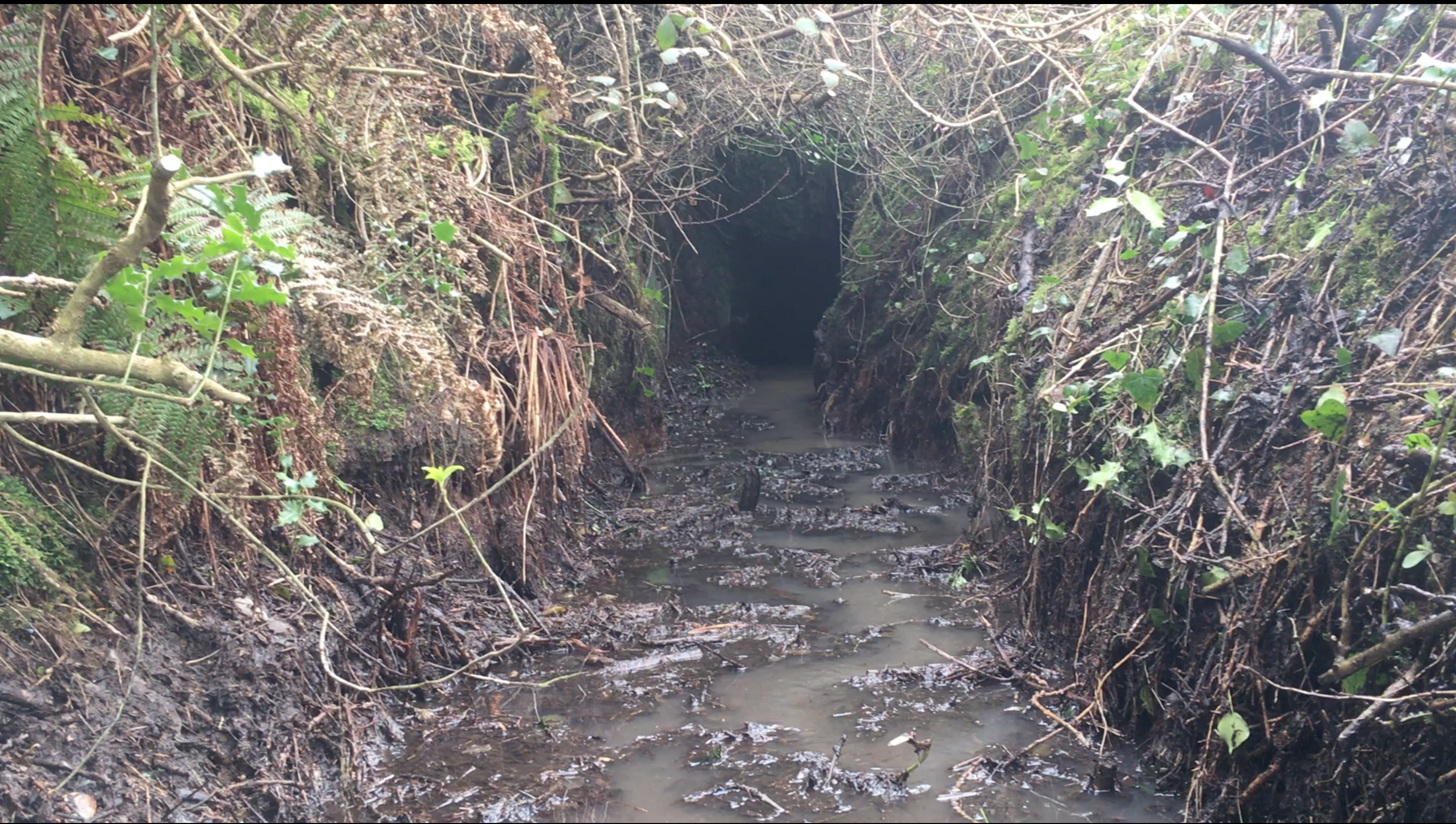
The Old Day Level rediscovered in 2018

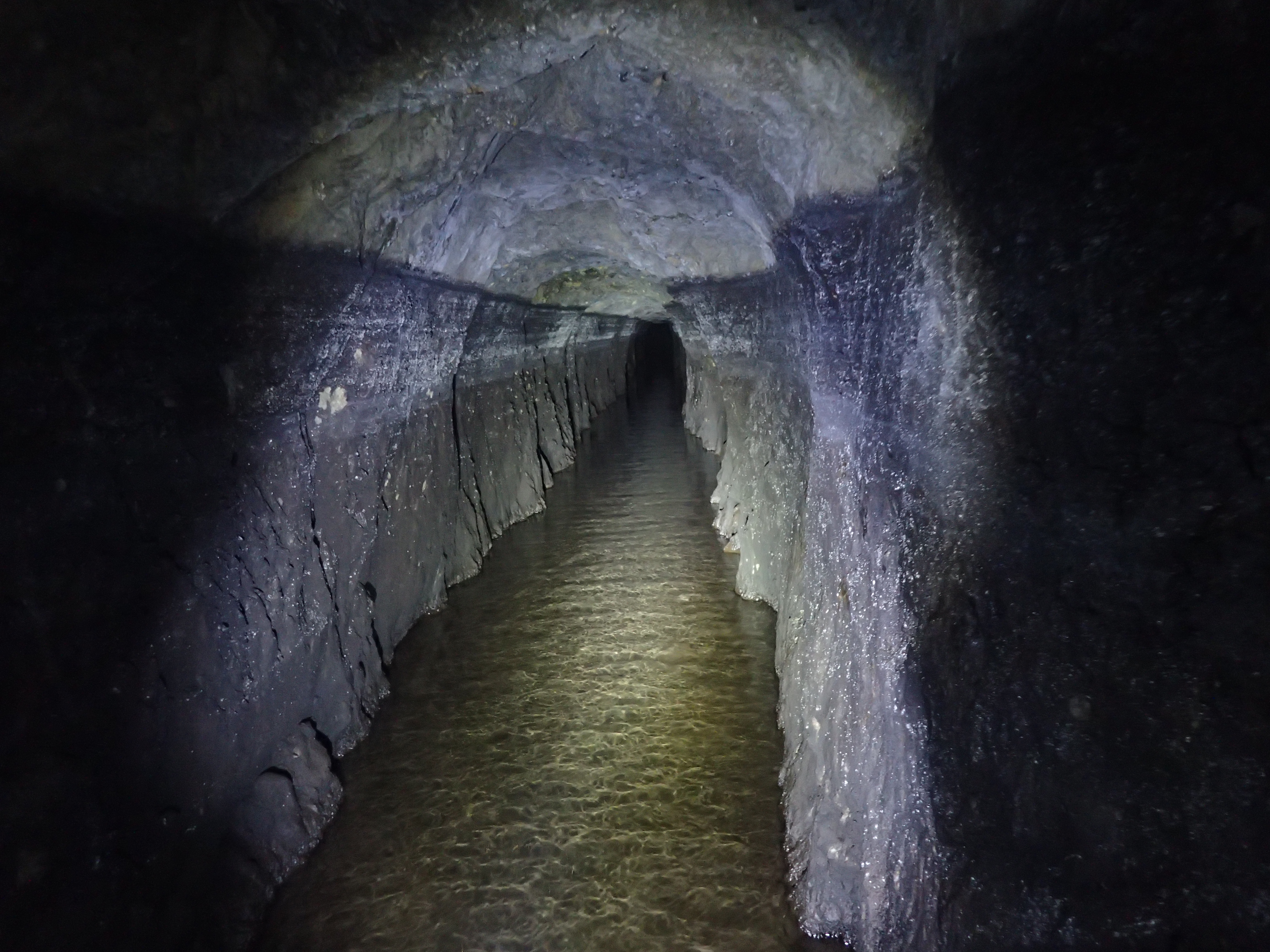
The New Day Level in 2018

The Penrhyn Du Mines are a collection of mines situated near Llanengan on the Llŷn Peninsula. It encompasses the Penrhyn, Assheton, Western and Tan-y-Bwlch mines. The whole region can be called Penrhyn Du which literally means "black headland".

Tan-y-Bwlch Mine was probably the richest of the mines with a recorded output of 8,722 long tons (8,862 tonnes) of lead ore, 450 long tons (460 tonnes) of zinc ore and 4,652 long tons (4,727 tonnes) of copper ore between 1873 and 1886.

== History ==
There is a possibility that Roman miners were the first to mine the Penrhyn Du headland After any Roman mining the mines were rarely worked until the reign of Elizabeth I where the need for lead was high. In 1637 Thomas Bushel was asked by Charles I to inspect and report on the prospects for Welsh mining. In his report of that year Bushel states:

"...that at Pottherly [sic] there is a vein which has never been wrought though known about these twenty years..."

during the 18th century various pumping engine powered by water wheels and horses were installed and in the early part of 1779 an order was placed for a Boulton & Watt steam engine which was put to work on 26 August 1780. This appears to have been unsuccessful as in 1781, Thomas Pennant noted that there had been

“...considerable adventurers for lead ore; and of late years attempts to drain the mines, by means of a fire engine: but the expences proved superior to the profits”.

Ore was still be exported in 1789 but by November of that year it was indicated that:

“the engine will soon be destined for a coalmine and unless [the situation is] altered for the best, this will take place in the spring”

The main period of working was in the 19th century. The engine house appears to have been altered and a Cornish Engine installed, and Cornish miners were also employed in the mines. By the turn of the 20th century the mining operations had mostly ceased. The last recorded output was in 1930 at just 5 tons.

== Location ==
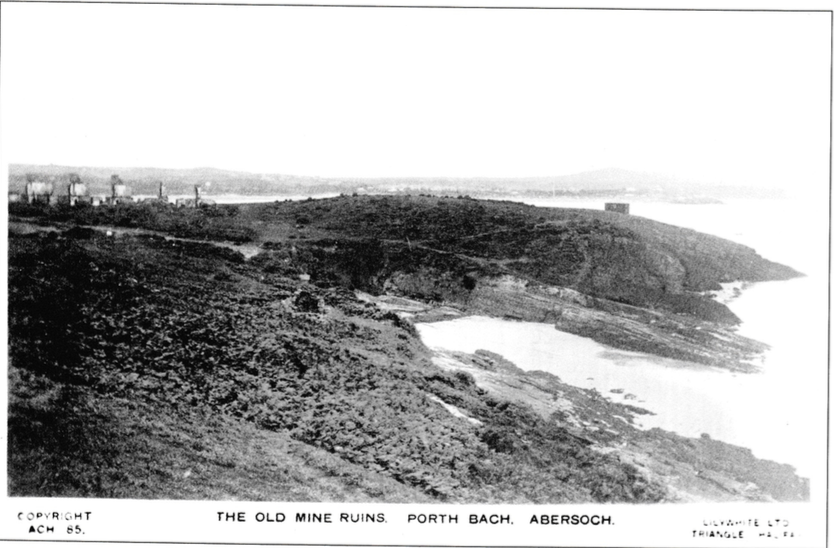
A Postcard dated 1930, of Porth Bach and Penrhyn du headland.

The Penrhyn Du mines are located within Gwynedd in north-west Wales. There are south of the village of Abersoch and east to the village of Llanenganon

== Recent history ==
After the mines closed modern developments have covered up many of the workings. Some evidence of the Cornish miners has been left, the most prominent of which is the ruins of the engine house and Cornish Row made up of the old cottages of the Cornish miners.

== Ore list ==
- Lead
- Manganese
- Copper
- Zinc
- Iron
