= Edern, Gwynedd =

Coordinates: 52.927°N 4.568°W

Edern
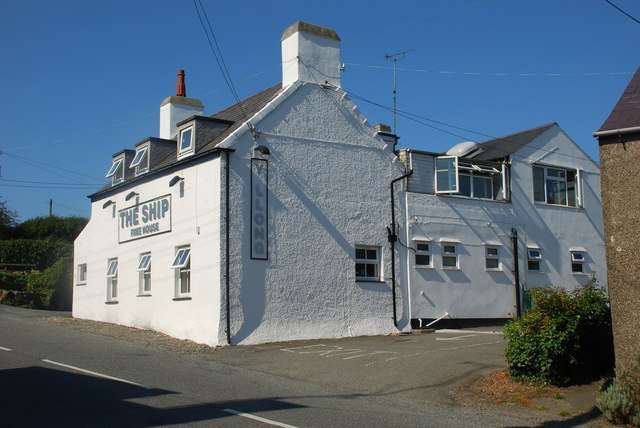
- The Ship

- Location within Gwynedd
- OS grid reference: SH274397
  - Cardiff: 116 miles SE
- Community: Nefyn
- Principal area: Gwynedd
- Preserved county: Gwynedd
- Country: Wales
- Sovereign state: United Kingdom
- Post town: PWLLHELI
- Postcode district: LL53
- Dialling code: 01758
- Police: North Wales
- Fire: North Wales
- Ambulance: Welsh
- UK Parliament: Dwyfor Meirionnydd
- Senedd Cymru – Welsh Parliament: Dwyfor Meirionnydd

Edern, formerly known as Edeyrn, is a village and until 1939 a civil parish, in the Welsh county of Gwynedd. It is about 1 km southwest of the larger village of Morfa Nefyn, near Caernarfon Bay on the north coast of the Llŷn Peninsula, on the B4417 road. The Afon Geirch flows through the village en route to the Irish Sea.

The Church of St Edern was rebuilt in 1867–68 but is said to stand on medieval footings and retains some 15th-century roof timbers. It is described in the official listing as "a small Victorian church of simple character". Edern Chapel is a Welsh Calvinistic Methodist chapel first built in 1775 but modified and rebuilt in the 19th century. Its interior has been described as being "of exceptional elaboration". Both buildings are Grade II listed.
