= Carnguwch =

Former civil parish in Gwynedd, Wales

Coordinates: 52.959°N 4.422°W

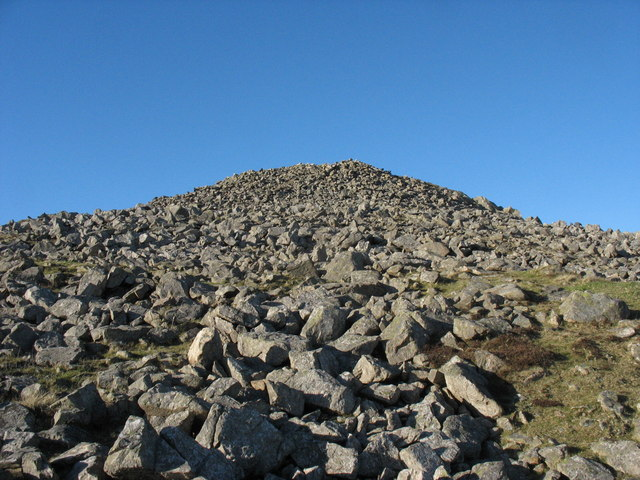
- Carnguwch Cairn

- Location within Gwynedd
- OS grid reference: SH3742
- Community: Pistyll
- Principal area: Gwynedd
- Preserved county: Gwynedd
- Country: Wales
- Sovereign state: United Kingdom
- Post town: PWLLHELI
- Postcode district: LL53
- Dialling code: 01758
- Police: North Wales
- Fire: North Wales
- Ambulance: Welsh
- UK Parliament: Dwyfor Meirionnydd
- Senedd Cymru – Welsh Parliament: Gwynedd Maldwyn

Carnguwch is a former civil parish in the Welsh county of Gwynedd. It was abolished in 1934, and incorporated into Pistyll. The parish included 1,179 feet (359 m) high Mynydd Carnguwch.
