= Pistyll =

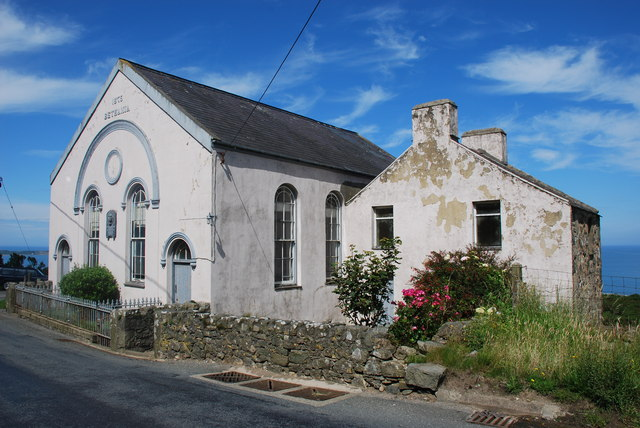
- Pistyll Capel Bethania Chapel

- Location within Gwynedd
- Population: 566 (2011)
- OS grid reference: SH326423
- Community: Pistyll
- Principal area: Gwynedd
- Preserved county: Gwynedd
- Country: Wales
- Sovereign state: United Kingdom
- Post town: PWLLHELI
- Postcode district: LL53
- Dialling code: 01758
- Police: North Wales
- Fire: North Wales
- Ambulance: Welsh
- UK Parliament: Dwyfor Meirionnydd
- Senedd Cymru – Welsh Parliament: Dwyfor Meirionnydd
- List of places UK Wales Gwynedd 52.952°N 4.492°W Map of the community

Pistyll is a village and community in the Welsh county of Gwynedd, located on the Llŷn Peninsula midway between Nefyn and Llanaelhaearn. Llithfaen is the largest settlement in the community and had a population of 566 according to the 2011 census. The actor Rupert Davies, best known for playing the title character in Maigret, retired to the village and is buried here.

The sixth century church, St. Beuno's, was used by mediaeval pilgrims travelling to Bardsey Island.
