= Llanfihangel Bachellaeth =

Coordinates: 52.881°N 4.52°W

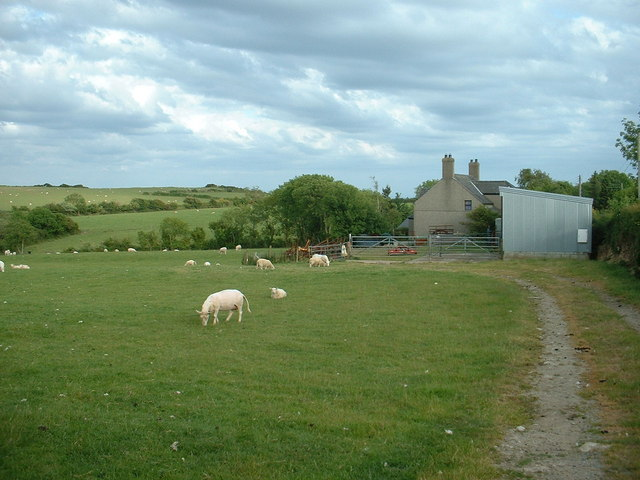
- Ty Newydd

- Location within Gwynedd
- OS grid reference: SH3034
- Community: Buan
- Principal area: Gwynedd
- Preserved county: Gwynedd
- Country: Wales
- Sovereign state: United Kingdom
- Post town: PWLLHELI
- Postcode district: LL53
- Dialling code: 01758
- Police: North Wales
- Fire: North Wales
- Ambulance: Welsh
- UK Parliament: Caernarfon
- Senedd Cymru – Welsh Parliament: Dwyfor Meirionnydd

Llanfihangel Bachellaeth is a former civil parish in the Welsh county of Gwynedd. It was abolished in 1934, and incorporated into Buan.
