= Ceidio =

Civil parish in Gwynedd, Wales

Coordinates: 52.914°N 4.549°W

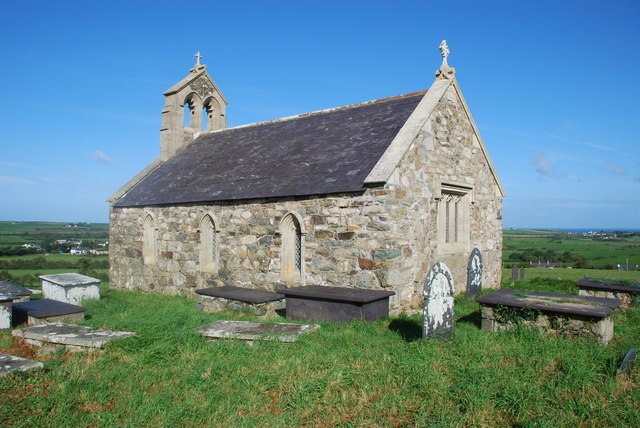
- St Ceidio's Church

- Location within Gwynedd
- OS grid reference: SH2838
- Community: Buan
- Principal area: Gwynedd
- Preserved county: Gwynedd
- Country: Wales
- Sovereign state: United Kingdom
- Post town: PWLLHELI
- Postcode district: LL53
- Dialling code: 01758
- Police: North Wales
- Fire: North Wales
- Ambulance: Welsh
- UK Parliament: Dwyfor Meirionnydd
- Senedd Cymru – Welsh Parliament: Gwynedd Maldwyn

Ceidio is a former civil parish in the Welsh county of Gwynedd. It was abolished in 1934, and incorporated into Buan.

The small church of St Ceidio is ancient and has been twice restored, in 1897 and 2006.
