= Llanfaglan =

Coordinates: 53.117°N 4.287°W

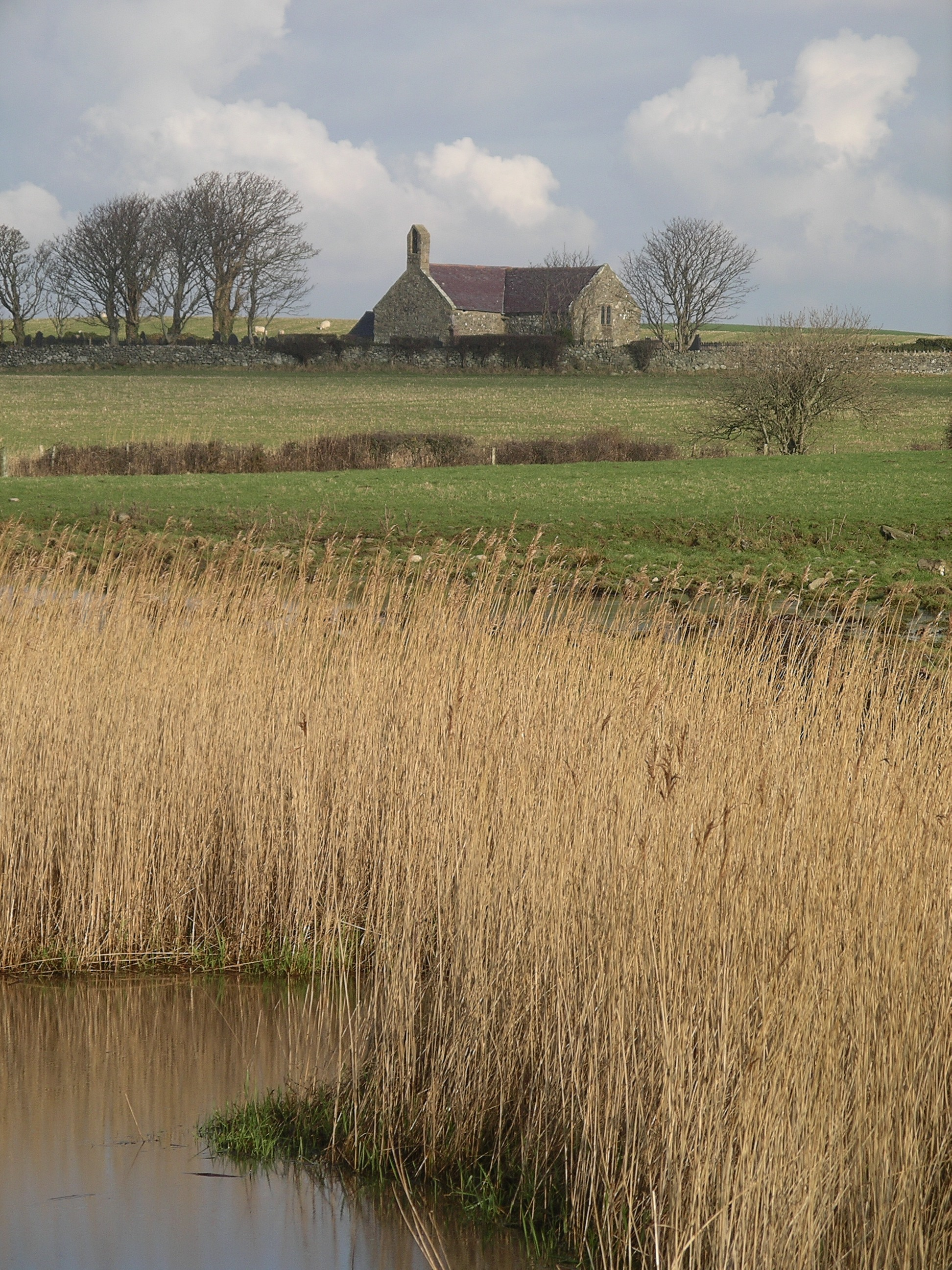
- St Baglan's church, Llanfaglan

- Location within Gwynedd
- OS grid reference: SH469602
- Community: Bontnewydd
- Principal area: Gwynedd
- Country: Wales
- Sovereign state: United Kingdom
- Post town: CAERNARFON
- Postcode district: LL54
- Dialling code: 01286
- Police: North Wales
- Fire: North Wales
- Ambulance: Welsh
- UK Parliament: Dwyfor Meirionnydd
- Senedd Cymru – Welsh Parliament: Arfon

Llanfaglan is a parish in Gwynedd, north-west Wales. It lay in the medieval cwmwd of Is Gwyrfai.

Llanfaglan is a medieval parish bordering with the parish of Llanbeblig, Caernarfon, on the shore of the Menai Strait and Traeth y Foryd.

It is in the modern community of Bontnewydd.

The church in Llanfaglan, St Baglan's (Grid reference SH 455 606) stands alone in the middle of a field and is now owned by the Friends of Friendless Churches. In 2005, it was discovered that the church and the older part of the cemetery were part of a pentagonal enclosure. The period of this enclosure is not known as it is the only one of this type known of in Europe up to now. A 5th or 6th Century gravestone inscribed with Fili Lovernii Anatemori, has been reused as a lintel over the door. This was the gravestone of Anatemarios, mab Loverniws. Although the Christian church probably dates from the 13th century, additions date from the 17th century as do the internal fittings. The church remains consecrated and is still in occasional use.

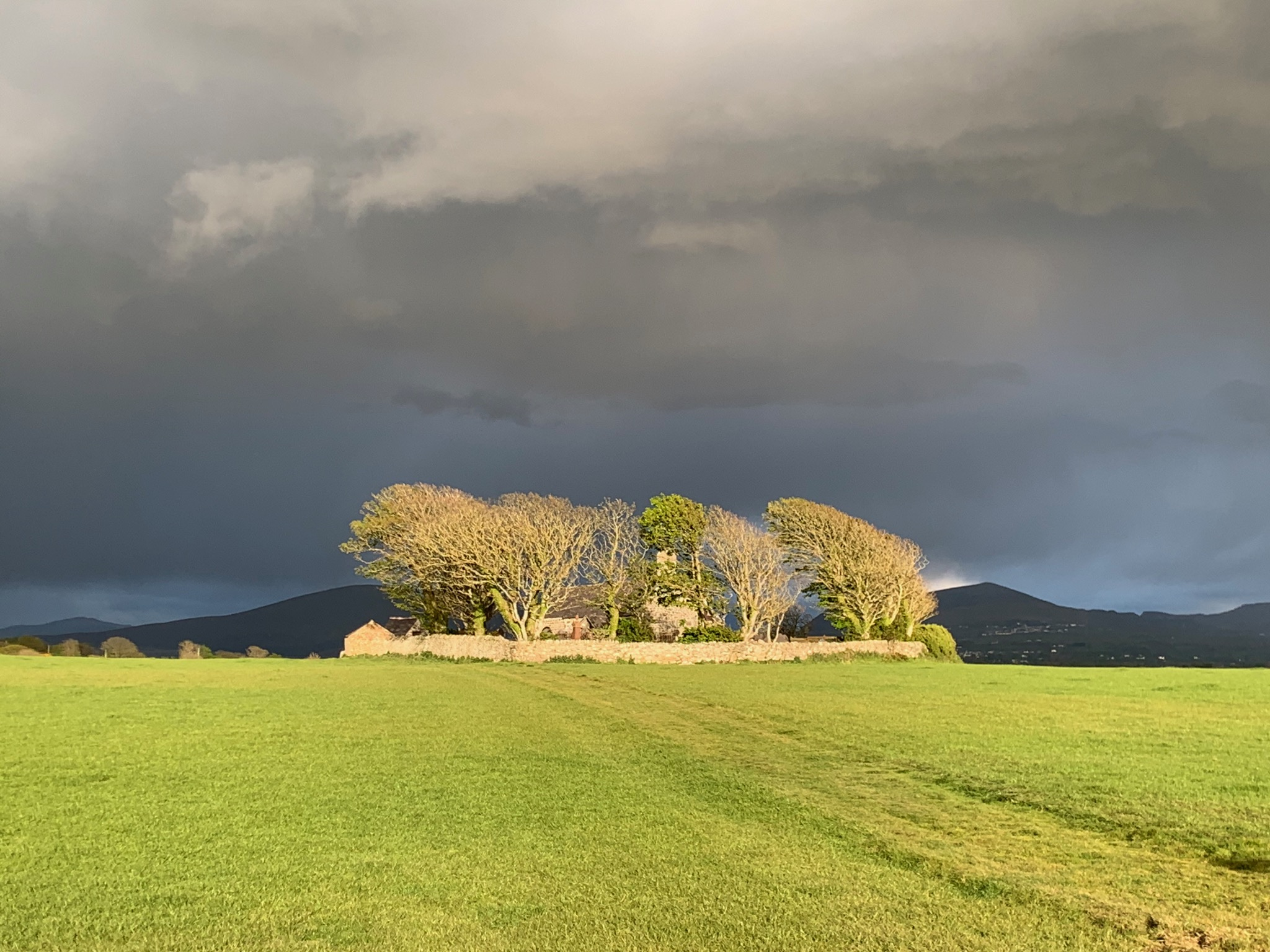
The church, just before the storm; 2021

== Anatemori Fili Lovernii ==
The stone notes the burial place of Lovernii the son of Anatemori. These are Brythonic names in a Latin inscription, not Latin names as claimed by some; the only Latin word here is Fili. This stone dates from roughly the end of the 5th to early 6th century. Loverniws is a personal name, in Cornish Lowern and in Breton, Louarn, (still in use today as a personal name). The Modern Welsh name is Llwynog (meaning fox). Whoever Lonerniws was, he was someone of status in society, as he was named after an animal. We see this also with the First Nations people of North America. His father's name Anatemarios is equivalent to “enaid” and “mawr” giving the name Eneidfawr. This is the influence of Latin because of the Roman settlement at Segontium nearby, where we see the Brythonic language being corrupted by Latin. Brythonic is the British language from which Welsh, Cornish, and Breton have evolved.

== Ffynnon Faglan ==
Next to the church in an open field once stood a well known as Ffynnon Faglan or Baglan's Well (B mutates to F). Llanfaglan was said to be the holy place of St. Baglan yg Coet Alun and the erection of the well was attributed to him. The water in the well was said to have healing powers. The afflicted area would be bathed and then into the well would be dropped a pin. The well was used also for the cure of warts. The wart would be washed, pricked with a pin and the pin then thrown into the well. The well was subsequently dredged in the nineteenth century (two basins of bent pins were recovered) and no longer exists, as it was completely removed around 2011.

== Maen Bedydd Baglan ==
A font is carved into the rock within a few yards of the site of the well. An article relating to this stone can be seen in the book Cam Arall i'r Gorffennol by Rhys Mwyn, a renowned archeologist in Wales, (ISBN 978-1-84527-567-9) published by Gwasg Carreg Gwalch.
