= Garn Boduan =

Celtic pre Roman hillfort in north Wales

Highest point
- Elevation: 279 m (915 ft)
- Prominence: 172 m (564 ft)
- Listing: Marilyn

Geography
- Location: Llŷn Peninsula, Wales
- Parent range: Snowdonia and Llyn Peninsula

Garn Boduan
- Gwynedd, Wales, UK
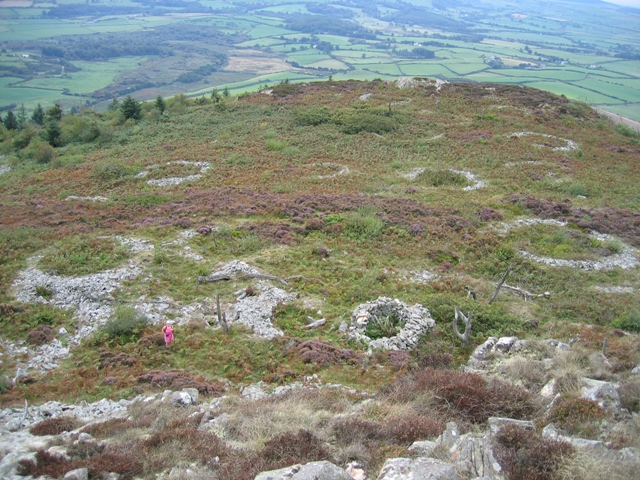
- Stone hut circles on Garn Boduan

Location
- Location in Wales Gwynedd
- Coordinates: 52.9247°N 4.5141°W
- Grid reference: SH311393

Garn Boduan is an Iron Age hillfort and hill near Nefyn, on the Llŷn Peninsula in Wales.

In a survey in the 1950s the traces of over 170 round houses were identified on this site, and around 100 round houses are still visible on the ground. Between 100 and 400 people may have lived in this fort. The lower stone rampart is the original defence built in the Iron Age. At a later date, perhaps in the 6th/7th century AD, a smaller rampart was built on the eastern side.

== See also ==
- List of hillforts in Wales
- List of Scheduled prehistoric Monuments in Gwynedd
