= Llanfair-is-gaer =

Former parish in Gwynedd, Wales

Coordinates: 53.170°N 4.243°W

Llanfair-is-gaer was an ecclesiastical parish in Caernarfon, Gwynedd: the parish church was St Mary's.

The ancient parish of Llanfair-is-gaer comprised the five townships of Bonyrafallen, Botandreg, Brynffynnon, Llanfair Isaf and Portdinorwig.

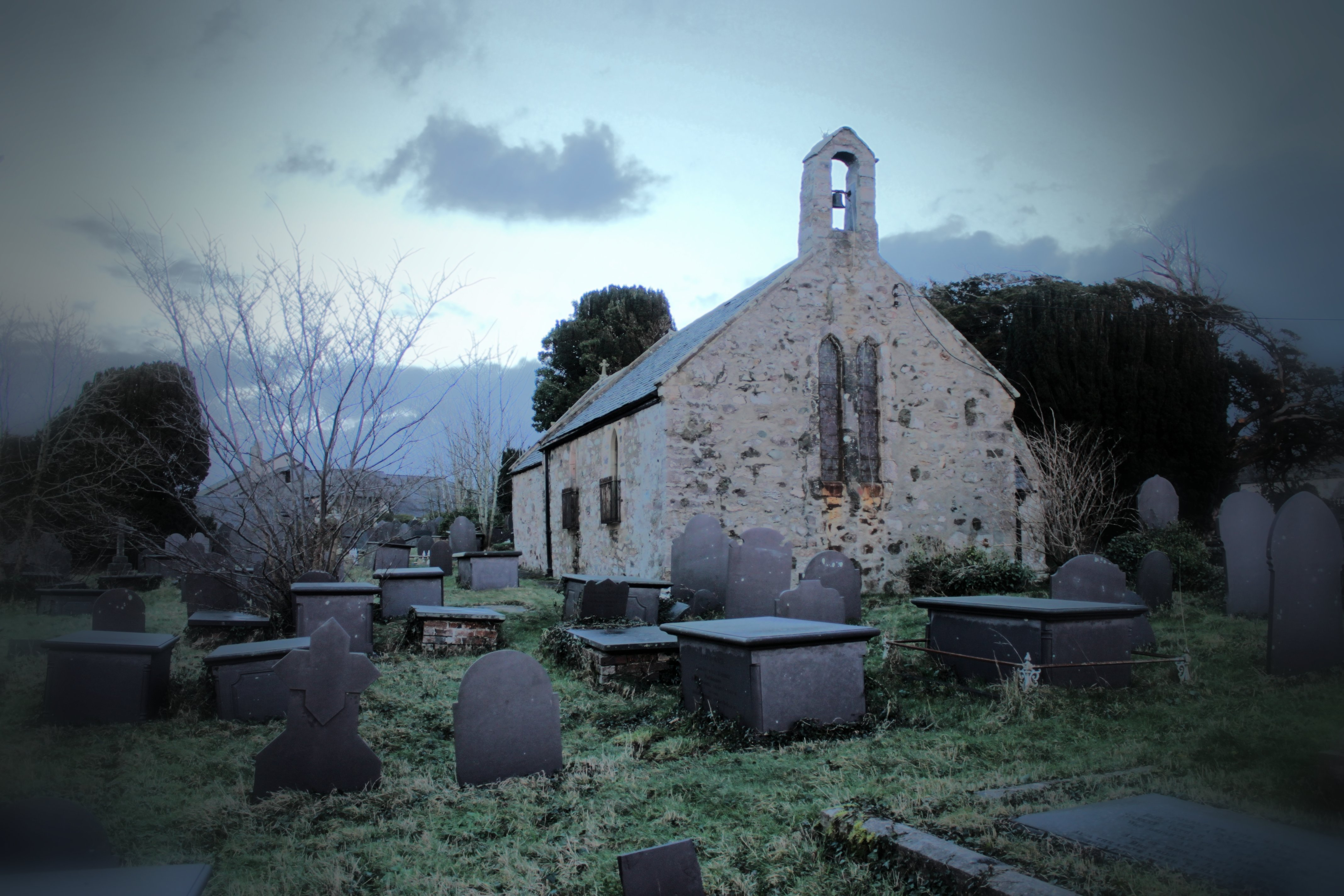
Llanfair-is-gaer
