= Bodferin =

Coordinates: 52.846°N 4.708°W

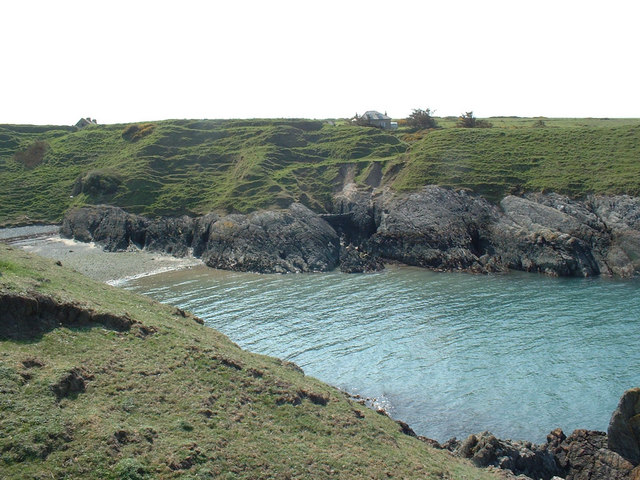
- Porth Ferin

- Location within Gwynedd
- OS grid reference: SH1731
- Community: Aberdaron
- Principal area: Gwynedd
- Preserved county: Gwynedd
- Country: Wales
- Sovereign state: United Kingdom
- Post town: PWLLHELI
- Postcode district: LL53
- Dialling code: 01758
- Police: North Wales
- Fire: North Wales
- Ambulance: Welsh
- UK Parliament: Dwyfor Meirionnydd
- Senedd Cymru – Welsh Parliament: Gwynedd Maldwyn

Bodferin is a former civil parish in the Welsh county of Gwynedd. It was abolished in 1934, and incorporated into Aberdaron.

John Marius Wilson's Imperial Gazetteer of England and Wales (1870-72) describes it as having been "on the coast, 4½ miles N by W of Aberdaron, and 14 WSW of Pwllheli rail station. Post Town, Aberdaron, under Pwllheli. Acres, 511. Real property, £278. Pop., 50. Houses, 12. The living is a perpetual curacy, united with Llaniestyn, in the diocese of Bangor. The church has disappeared; but there are ruins of an ancient chapel."
