= Penllyn, Gwynedd =

Coordinates: 52.92°N 4.218°W

Penllyn
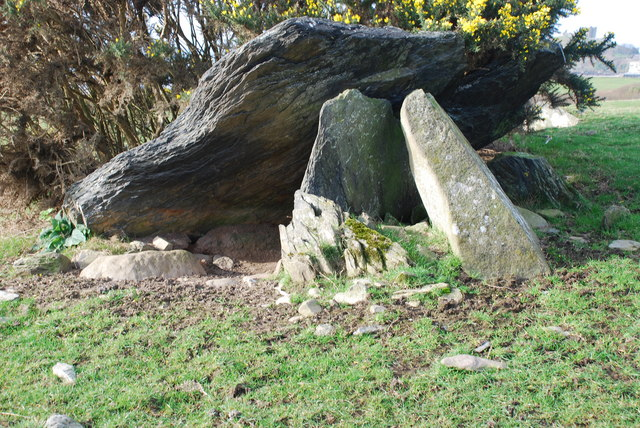
- Cromlech Caer-dyni

- Location within Gwynedd
- OS grid reference: SH5138
- Community: Criccieth
- Principal area: Gwynedd
- Preserved county: Gwynedd
- Country: Wales
- Sovereign state: United Kingdom
- Post town: CRICCIETH
- Postcode district: LL52
- Dialling code: 01766
- Police: North Wales
- Fire: North Wales
- Ambulance: Welsh
- UK Parliament: Caernarfon
- Senedd Cymru – Welsh Parliament: Dwyfor Meirionnydd

Penllyn is a former civil parish in the Welsh county of Gwynedd. The parish was created in 1894 from the part of Criccieth parish that lay outside the ancient borough. It was abolished in 1934, and divided between Llanystumdwy and Criccieth. The area gives its name to a special stage used during the 2013 Wales Rally GB.
