= Llaniestyn, Gwynedd =

Coordinates: 52.874°N 4.573°W

Llaniestyn
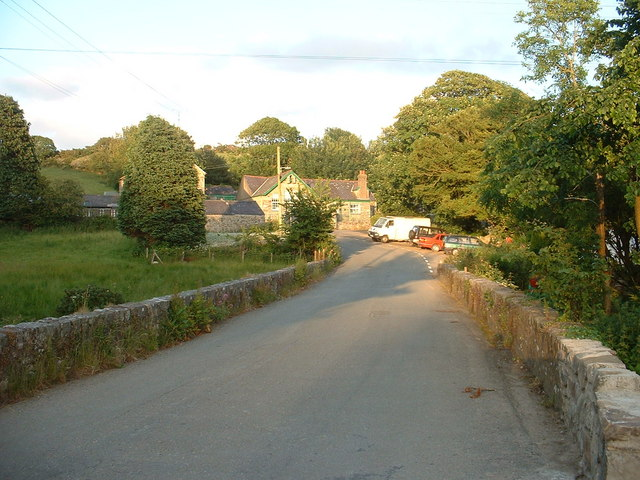
- Llaniestyn

- Location within Gwynedd
- OS grid reference: SH268338
- Community: Tudweiliog
- Principal area: Gwynedd
- Preserved county: Gwynedd
- Country: Wales
- Sovereign state: United Kingdom
- Post town: PWLLHELI
- Postcode district: LL53
- Dialling code: 01758
- Police: North Wales
- Fire: North Wales
- Ambulance: Welsh
- UK Parliament: Dwyfor Meirionnydd
- Senedd Cymru – Welsh Parliament: Dwyfor Meirionnydd

Llaniestyn is a village and former civil parish in the Welsh county of Gwynedd. The parish was abolished in 1934, and divided between Tudweiliog and Botwnnog. St Iestyn's Church stands in the centre of the village and is a Grade I listed building.
