= North West Wales =

Area of Wales

Coordinates: 53°N 4°W

Map of North West Wales

North West Wales (Welsh: Gogledd-Orllewin Cymru) is an area or region of Wales, commonly defined as a grouping of the principal areas of Conwy County Borough, Gwynedd and the Isle of Anglesey in the north-west of the country. These principal areas make up the entire preserved county of Gwynedd, and parts of Clwyd. It is bordered by Denbighshire, in North East Wales to the east, Powys, and Ceredigion in Mid Wales to the south, and the Irish Sea to the north and west (as Cardigan Bay). It is the more mountainous, rural, and sparsely populated part of the north Wales geographic region.

Settlements include: Bangor, Caernarfon, Colwyn Bay, Holyhead, Llandudno, and Pwllheli. The port of Holyhead serves as the major sea link between Wales and Ireland. Snowdonia National Park is located wholly in the area, hosting Snowdon, the largest peak in British Isles excluding the Scottish Highlands. The area also hosts AONBs (Area of Outstanding Natural Beauty) in the Llŷn Peninsula and Isle of Anglesey, and the Castles and Town Walls of King Edward UNESCO World Heritage Site.

== Usage and definition ==
The term North West Wales is used by the Welsh Government in the Wales Spatial Plan and the BBC.

== Description ==
North West Wales comprises Conwy, Gwynedd and the Anglesey. The Welsh Government's strategy People, Places, Futures treats the trio as a single functional region, labelled Eryri a Môn, sharing a bilingual heartland and a coastal labour market focused on Bangor, Caernarfon and Llandudno.

At the 2021 census the combined population was about 301,000: 114,800 in Conwy, 117,400 in Gwynedd, and 68,900 on Anglesey. The land area of roughly 4,390 km^{2} gives an average population density near 69 inhabitants per square kilometre, among the most sparsely populated parts of Great Britain, and the median age in each county is several years above the Welsh mean.

Physically the region is dominated by Snowdonia (Eryri) national park, 2,130 km^{2} of upland and coast that contains Snowdon (Yr Wyddfa), Wales's highest peak. Two AONBs—the Llŷn Peninsula and the Anglesey AONB—add further landscape protection, while the four Castles and Town Walls of King Edward at Caernarfon, Conwy, Harlech and Beaumaris form a single UNESCO World Heritage Site. TTourism linked to these assets underpins much of the service economy, generating an estimated £1.9 billion in visitor expenditure across North Wales in 2023. The ferry port of Holyhead complements this sector, remaining the United Kingdom's busiest roll-on/roll-off link with Ireland and handling about 2.1 million passengers in 2023.

Economic policy is now shaped by the £1 billion North Wales Growth Deal, signed in December 2020, which aims to create up to 4,200 jobs and add £2.4 billion in net GVA across North Wales, with flagship low-carbon and digital projects clustered in Gwynedd and on Anglesey.

== See also ==
- South West Wales
- North East Wales
- Mid Wales
- South East Wales
