= Nefyn =

Town in Gwynedd, Wales

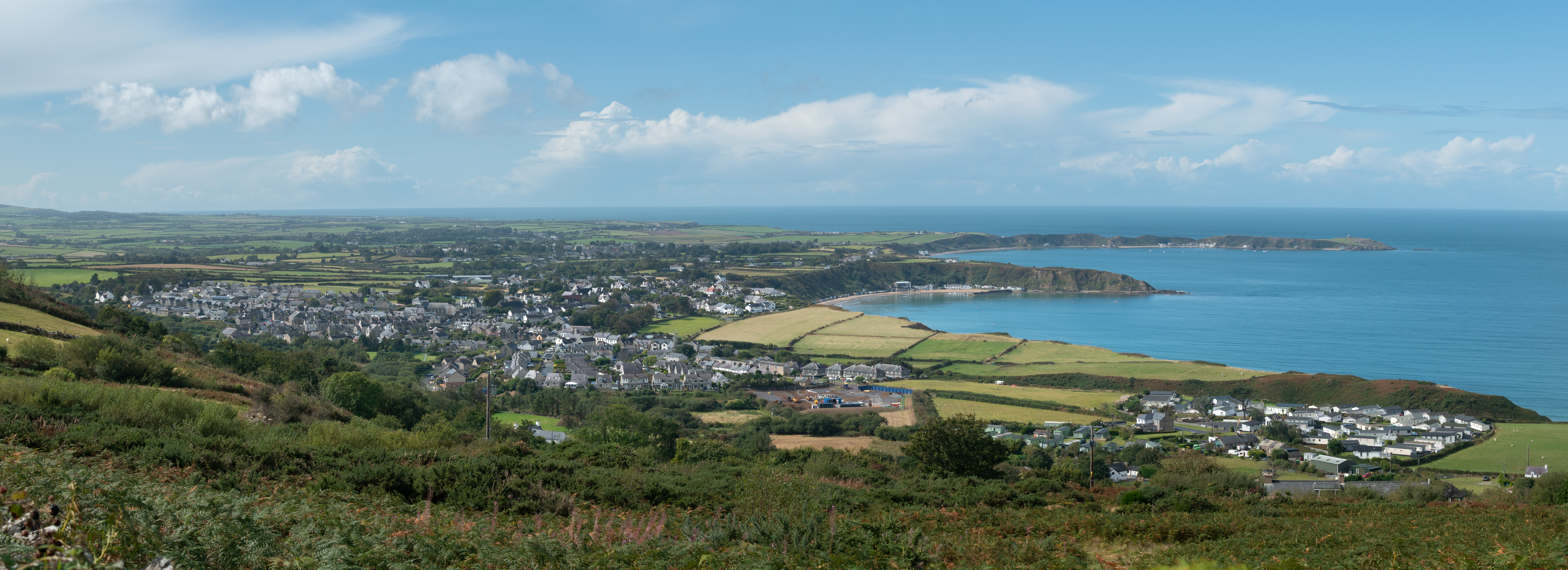
- A view over Nefyn

- Location within Gwynedd
- Population: 2,602 (2011)
- OS grid reference: SH304405
- Community: Nefyn
- Principal area: Gwynedd
- Preserved county: Gwynedd
- Country: Wales
- Sovereign state: United Kingdom
- Post town: PWLLHELI
- Postcode district: LL53
- Dialling code: 01758
- Police: North Wales
- Fire: North Wales
- Ambulance: Welsh
- UK Parliament: Caernarfon
- Senedd Cymru – Welsh Parliament: Gwynedd Maldwyn
- List of places UK Wales Gwynedd 52.935°N 4.524°W Map of the community

Nefyn (Welsh pronunciation: [ˈnɛvɨn], archaically anglicised as Nevin) is a town and community on the northwest coast of the Llŷn Peninsula, Gwynedd, Wales. Nefyn is popular with visitors for its sandy beach, and has one substantial hotel, a community pub and a beach café. The A497 road terminates in the town centre.

The community includes Edern and Morfa Nefyn. In 2011, the population was 2,602, with Nefyn itself having 1,373 people.

== History ==
The history of the area can be traced back to 300 BC with the Iron Age hillfort of Garn Boduan overlooking Nefyn. The remains of 170 round stone huts and ramparts are still visible on top of the 917 feet (280 m) hill.

The earliest known reference to Nefyn in documents dates from the latter part of the 11th century, when it is mentioned as a landing place of the Welsh prince, Gruffudd ap Cynan.

Gerald of Wales, writing in his account of a journey around Wales in 1188, says that he slept at Nefyn on the eve of Palm Sunday.

Nefyn was the location of the court of the commote of Dinlaen: part of the cantref of Llŷn.

Edward I of England held a jousting tournament in the town in 1284 to celebrate his victory over the Welsh, emphasising its importance at that time as a trading town. In 1355, it became a free borough and remained an important centre of commerce.

The sea was always an important part of the economy of Nefyn; and fishing, particularly for herring, became the prime trade for most of the 18th and 19th centuries: so much so that the town's coat of arms bears three herrings. Herring were locally referred to as "Nefyn beef". In 1910, Nefyn had 40 herring fishing boats, but herring fishing ceased around the time of the First World War. The area nurtured many ships' captains in the age of sail, and shipbuilding was also an important local industry. About 3 miles to the south-west is Madryn Castle, home of Sir Love Jones-Parry, 1st Baronet, one of the founders of the settlement of Puerto Madryn in Argentina.

=== Parish church and origin of the name Nefyn ===
The foundations of the old St Mary's parish church date from the 6th century, although the present building was erected in 1827. It would have been an important staging post for pilgrimages to Ynys Enlli (Bardsey Island). The old church is no longer a place of worship but houses a museum dedicated to the maritime history of Nefyn. Since 2013, archaeologists have been investigating the area under the church and have uncovered a 13th–14th century brooch and the remains of a lady buried sometime between 1180 and 1250 in an older form of entombment called a cist grave.

The place name is of uncertain origin. It is recorded as Newin in 1254, and as Nefyn in 1291. It may represent a personal name. The official spelling of the name was changed from Nevin to Nefyn in 1955.

The Romans recorded a tribe occupying the peninsula called the 'Gangani', who are also recorded as a tribe in Ireland.

=== 20th century and after ===
Nefyn & District Golf Club was formed in 1907. The course added a further 9 holes in 1912 and a third set of 9 holes in 1933. The current course is made up of a front ten with a choice of two back eights. It is set high on the sea cliffs of the narrow peninsula overlooking Porthdinllaen bay.

Since 1929, Nefyn has played host to a Beach Mission, which runs for two weeks at the beginning of August each year.

Nefyn football club, Nefyn United F.C., was formed in 1932 and has enjoyed some success over the years, winning numerous league titles. At present, the senior team competes in the Welsh Alliance League: it was promoted from the Gwynedd League in 2005–06.

During the Second World War, the Royal Air Force built a Chain Home radar station to the south-west of Nefyn.

In 1977, the Llŷn Maritime Museum was opened in the Church of St Mary by a group of volunteers. It closed in 2000 on grounds of health and safety, but was redeveloped from 2007 and reopened in 2014.

The area has a history of earth tremors and landslides. A tremor in the area on 12 December 1940 was reported by the Cambrian News as having caused two fatalities including John Thomas of Nefyn who died of a heart attack. On 19 July 1984, an earthquake measuring 5.4 on the Richter scale had an epicentre near Nefyn. This was one of the strongest tremors recorded in Britain in recent times but caused little structural damage. A fatal landslide occurred at Y Lôn Gam on 2 January 2001. On 19 April 2021, a landslide resulted in a cliff collapse, which affected gardens in Rhodfa'r Môr, but there were no casualties. A further landslide on 29 October 2021 blocked vehicular access to the beach at Y Lôn Gam and the adjacent cliff path was closed.

Nefyn is twinned with Puerto Madryn, a town in Chubut Province in Argentina (see Welsh settlement in Argentina).

== Demographics ==
=== Welsh language ===
According to the 2011 Census, Nefyn is the community with the 28th highest percentage of Welsh speakers in Wales. 74.2% of residents aged three and over reported being able to speak Welsh in the 2011 Census, as compared to 77.9% reporting being able to do so in the 2001 Census. In the 2021 census, 73.1% of respondents reported being able to speak Welsh.

== Governance ==
There are two Nefyn electoral wards (Nefyn and Morfa Nefyn). The population of Nefyn Ward at the 2011 census was 1,373, and at the 2021 census it was 1,290.

== Nefyn landslide, April 2021 ==
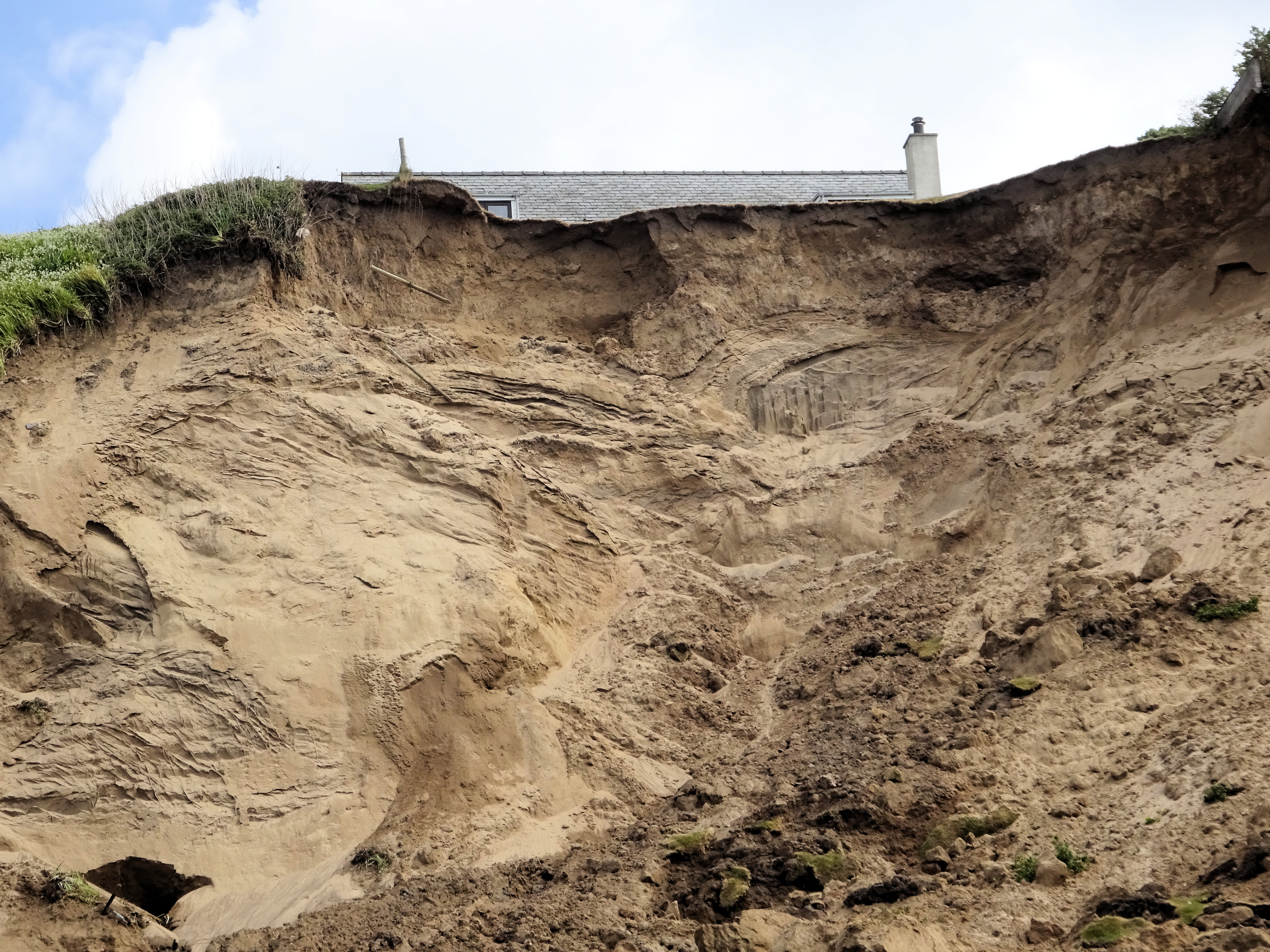

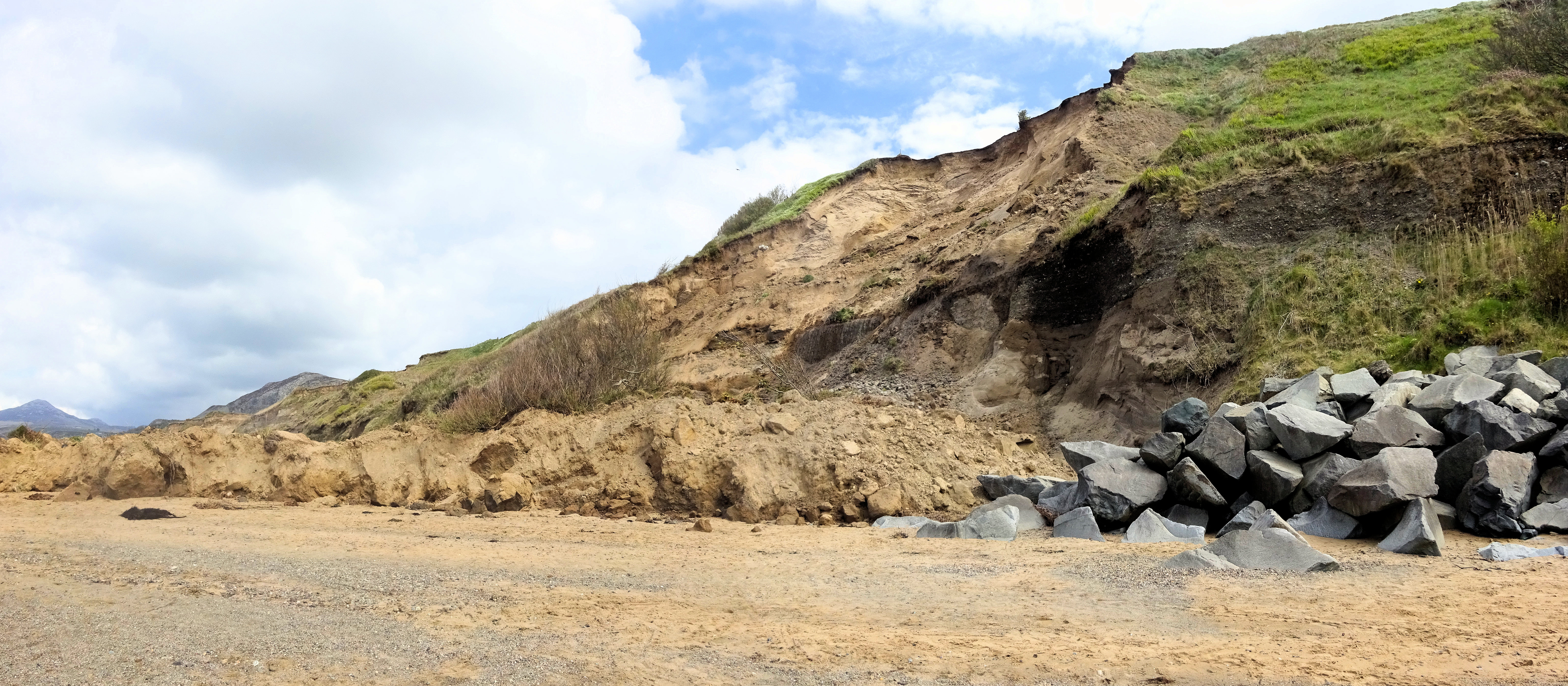

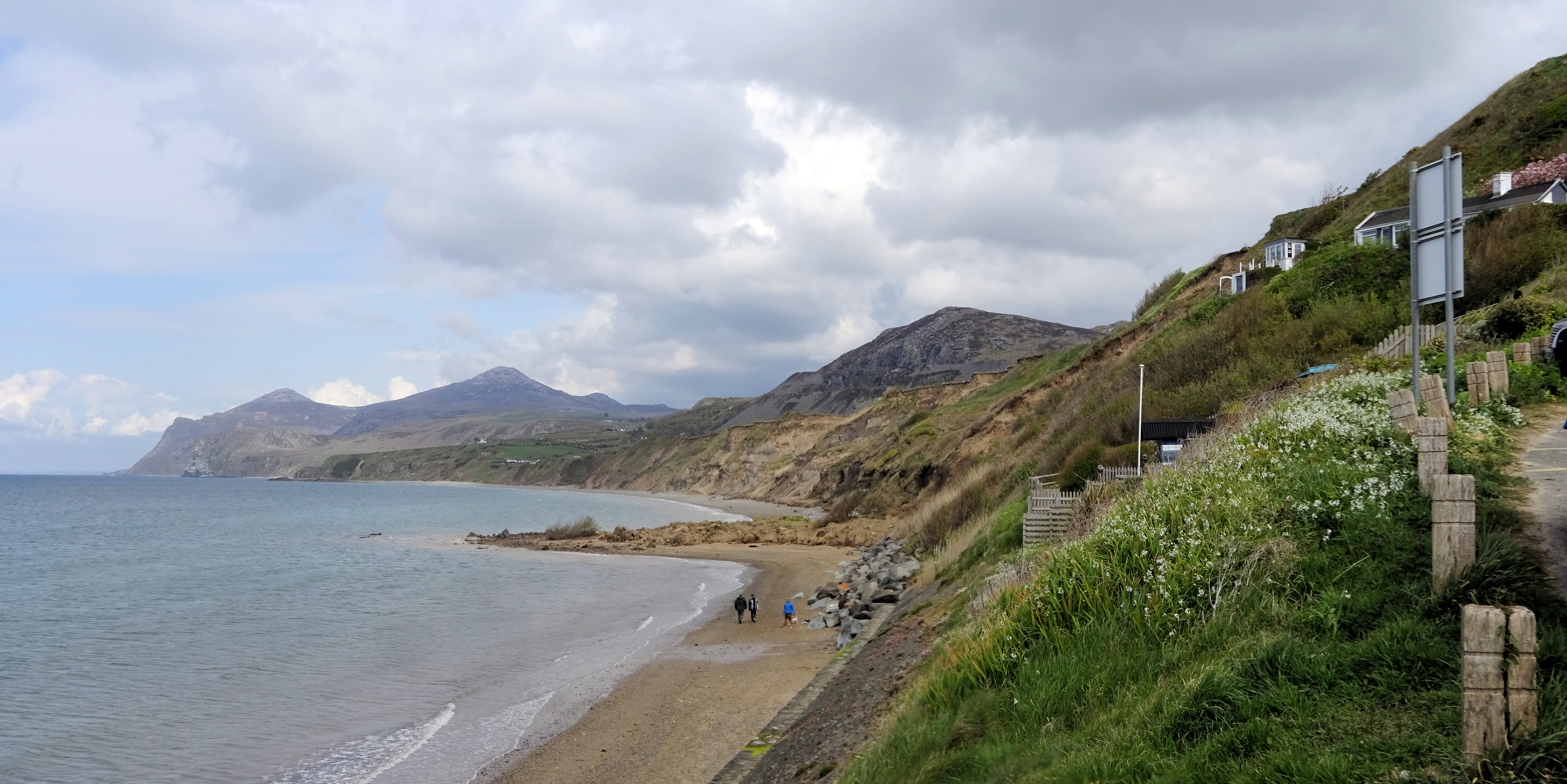

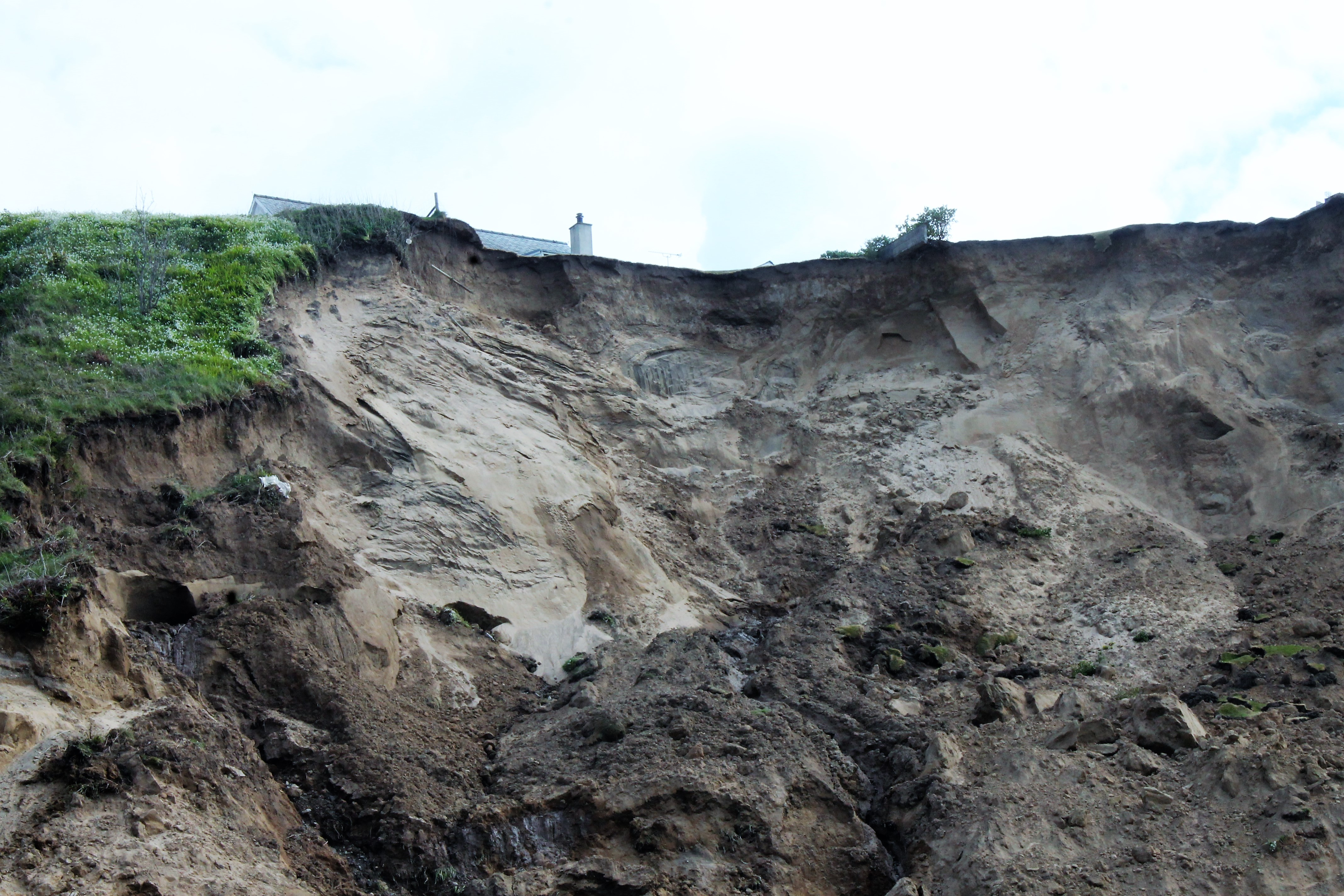

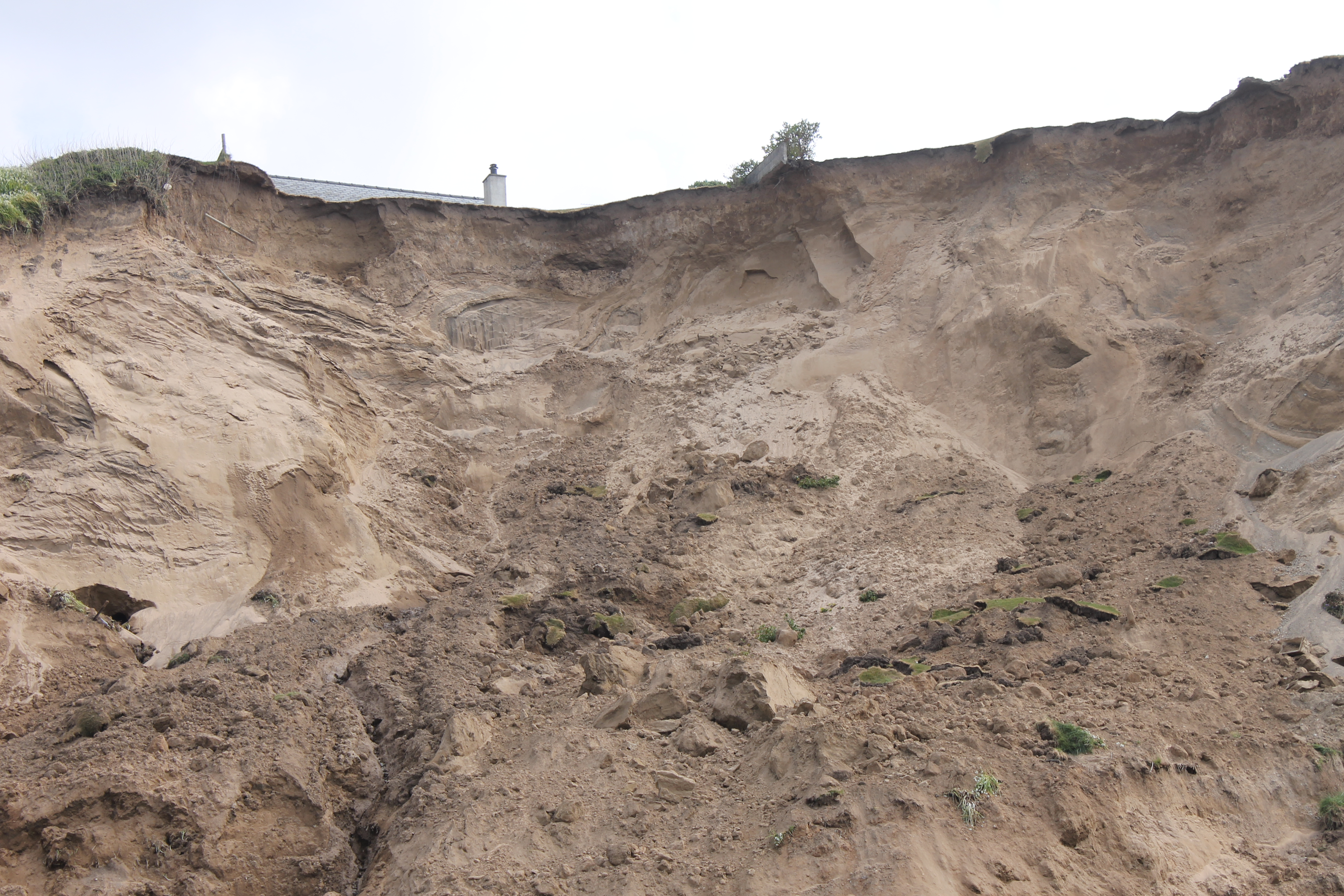

== Notable people ==
- Harpist John Parry (c. 1710–1782), known as Parry Ddall Rhiwabon (Blind Parry of Rhiwabon).
- Sir Thomas Duncombe Love Jones-Parry (1832–1891), 1st Baronet, Liberal MP and one of the founders of the Welsh settlement in Argentina, inherited the Madryn estate near Nefyn in 1853.
- Elizabeth Watkin-Jones (1887–1966), author of children's books in the Welsh language, was born in Nefyn on 13 July 1887.
- Singer Duffy was born in Nefyn.
