= List of churches in Gwynedd =

The following is a list of churches in Gwynedd, a county in Wales.

== Active churches ==
The only community which probably has no active churches is Llanfrothen although Saint Brothen's Church still has the occasional service.

There is no online register of churches belonging to the Union of Welsh Independents, so the only source for UWI churches is the Coflein (historic buildings) register, at which point it becomes impossible to distinguish open from closed UWI churches.

The council area has an estimated 243 to 338 active churches for 123,600 inhabitants, a ratio of one church to every 366 to 509 inhabitants.

Name	Community (settlement)	Dedication	Web	Founded	Denomination	Ministry Area	Notes
Capel Bethania, Abergwyngregyn	Abergwyngregyn	Bethany			Presbyterian		
St Hywyn, Aberdaron	Aberdaron	Hywyn		Medieval	Church in Wales	Bro Enlli	Grade I listed. "New" church used 1841 - 1940s
Capel Deunant, Aberdaron	Aberdaron			1895	Presbyterian		
St Maelrhys, Llanfaelrhys	Aberdaron (Llanfaelrhys)	Maelrhys		Medieval	Church in Wales	Bro Enlli	
Capel Bethesda, Rhoshirwaun	Aberdaron (Rhoshirwaun)	Pool of Bethesda		1814	Baptist Union		Current building 1904
Capel Uwchmynydd	Aberdaron (Uwchmynydd)			1871	Presbyterian		Rebuilt 1904
Capel Nebo, Rhiw	Aberdaron (Y Rhiw)	Nebo		1807	Independent		Building 1813, rebuilt 1876
St Peter, Aberdyfi	Aberdyfi	Peter		1830s	Church in Wales	Bro Ystumanner	
Capel Bethel, Aberdyfi	Aberdyfi	Bethel		1829	Methodist		Rebuilt 1868
Aberdovey English Presbyterian Church	Aberdyfi			1881	Presbyterian		Current building 1893
St Catherine, Arthog	Arthog	Catherine of Alexandria		late C18th	Church in Wales	Bro Cymer	Originally chapel of ease to Llangelynnin
Capel Caerdon, Arthog	Arthog				Unknown		Still active in 2011
St Cynon, Fairbourne	Arthog (Fairbourne)	Cynon		1927	Church in Wales	Bro Cymer	
Capel Peniel, Islaw'r Dref	Arthog (Islaw'r Dref)	Penuel		1825	Independent		Rebuilt c1850. Found in Coflein only; perhaps defunct
Christ Church, Bala	Bala	Jesus		1811	Church in Wales	Bala	Rebuilt 1853-1857
Our Lady of Fatima, Bala	Bala	Mary		1948	Roman Catholic	Dolgellau Parish	Congregation may be older
Capel Tegid, Bala	Bala			1757	Presbyterian	Thomas Charles Area Pastorate	Rebuilt 1809, 1867. AKA Capel Coffa Thomas Charles
Capel Heol-y-Domen, Bala	Bala			1779	Independent		Rebuilt 1813, 1867
Bala Evangelical Church	Bala			1981	AECW		
Mount Zion Pentecostal Church	Bala	Zion			Unknown		Found in Coflein only; perhaps defunct
Bangor Cathedral	Bangor	Deiniol		Ancient	Church in Wales	Bro Deiniol	Grade I listed
Our Lady & St James, Bangor	Bangor	Mary & James			Roman Catholic	Bangor & Caernarfon Parish	From 1996, meets in St James' CiW church
Penrallt English Baptist Church	Bangor			1875	Baptist Union GB		Moved to larger building (Twr-Gwyn, built 1854) 2003
Capel Peniel, Bangor	Bangor	Penuel		1814	Baptist Union		Rebuilt 1865, 1909. New building 1950
St John's English Methodist Church, Bangor	Bangor	John ?		1873	Methodist	Bangor & Holyhead Circuit	
Capel Berea Newydd, Bangor	Bangor	Berea		1860	Presbyterian		Rebuilt 1907, moved to smaller building 2003
Capel Tyddyn-yr-Ordor, Bangor	Bangor			1790	Independent		Found in Coflein only; perhaps defunct
Capel Glanadda, Bangor	Bangor				Independent		Found in Coflein only; perhaps defunct
Ebenezer Evangelical Church	Bangor	Eben-Ezer		1858	AECW		Rebuilt 1876. Began as Methodist. AECW 1969
Bangor Pentecostal Church	Bangor			1882	Assemblies of God		Meets in old English Presbyterian Church
Holy Cross, Maesgeirchen	Bangor (Maesgeirchen)	Cross			Church in Wales	Bro Deiniol	
St David, Barmouth	Barmouth	David of Wales		1830	Church in Wales	Bro Ardudwy	
St John, Barmouth	Barmouth	John the Evangelist		1889-1895	Church in Wales	Bro Ardudwy	
St Tudwal, Barmouth	Barmouth	Tudwal		1891	Roman Catholic	Harlech & Barmouth Parish	Rebuilt 1904-1905
Christ Church English Presbyterian Church	Barmouth	Jesus		1878	Presbyterian		Shares building (1866) with Capel Caersalem
Capel Caersalem, Barmouth	Barmouth	Jerusalem		1825	Presbyterian		New building 1866. Shares building with Christ Church
Barmouth Elim Church	Barmouth			1997	Elim		
SS Mary & Bodfan, Llanaber	Barmouth (Llanaber)	Mary & Bodfan		Medieval	Church in Wales	Bro Ardudwy	Grade I listed
St Mary, Beddgelert	Beddgelert	Mary		Ancient	Church in Wales	Bro Eifionydd	Previously a priory
Capel Peniel, Nantmor	Beddgelert (Nantmor)	Penuel		1829	Presbyterian		Rebuilt 1868. On PCW site but apparently a house
Christ Church, Bethesda	Bethesda	Jesus		1855-1856	Church in Wales	Bro Ogwen	
Capel Bethel, Carneddi	Bethesda (Rachub)	Bethel		1885	Baptist Union		
Jerusalem United Church, Bethesda	Bethesda	Jerusalem		1842	Presbyterian		Grade I listed
Capel Salem, Bethesda	Bethesda	Jerusalem		1871	Independent		Found in Coflein only; perhaps defunct
Coetmor Church	Bethesda (Coetmor)				Church in Wales	Bro Ogwen	
St Garmon, Betws Garmon	Betws Garmon	Germanus of Auxerre		Medieval	Church in Wales	Llanbeblig with Caernarfon	Rebuilt and slightly moved 1841-1842
Capel Libanus, Bontnewydd	Bontnewydd	Mount Lebanon		1867	Independent		Found in Coflein only; perhaps defunct
St Beuno, Botwnnog	Botwnnog	Beuno		Medieval	Church in Wales	Bro Madryn	
Capel Rhydbach, Botwnnog	Botwnnog			1889	Presbyterian		
St Mary, Bryncroes	Botwnnog (Bryncroes)	Mary		Medieval	Church in Wales	Bro Madryn	
Capel Ty Mawr, Bryncroes	Botwnnog (Bryncroes)			1752	Presbyterian		Rebuilt 1840
Capel Peniel, Tyddynshin	Botwnnog (nr Bryncroes)	Penuel			Baptist Union		
Capel Hebron, Llangwnnadl	Botwnnog (Llangwnnadl)	Hebron		1822	Independent		Rebuilt 1909. Found in Coflein only; perhaps defunct
Capel Rehoboth, Llaniestyn	Botwnnog (Llaniestyn)	Rehoboth		1800	Independent		Building 1807, rebuilt 1869
Capel Salem, Sarn Mellteyrn	Botwnnog (Sarn Meyllteyrn)	Jerusalem		1879	Presbyterian		
Capel Abergeirw	Brithdir & Llanfachreth (Abergeirw)			1820	Presbyterian		Rebuilt 1873
Capel Brithdir	Brithdir & Llanfachreth (Brithdir)			1860	Independent		Found in Coflein only; perhaps defunct
St Paul, Bryncoedifor	Brithdir & Llanfachreth (Bryncoedifor)	Paul		1846	Church in Wales	Bro Cymer	
St Machreth, Llanfachreth	Brithdir & Llanfachreth (Llanfachreth)	Machreth		Medieval	Church in Wales	Bro Cymer	Rebuilt 1871-1874
Capel Ffrwd, Llanfachreth	Brithdir & Llanfachreth (Llanfachreth)			1840	Independent		Rebuilt 1875. Found in Coflein only; perhaps defunct
Capel Rhyd-y-main	Brithdir & Llanfachreth (Rhyd-y-main)			1791	Independent		Found in Coflein only; perhaps defunct
Capel Bethlehem, Bryncrug	Bryn-crug	Bethlehem		1800	Presbyterian		Rebuilt 1883
Capel Saron, Bryncrug	Bryn-crug	Sharon Plain		1837	Independent		Found in Coflein only; perhaps defunct
Capel Peniel, Ceidio	Buan (Ceidio)	Penuel		1823	Congregational		Found in Coflein only; perhaps defunct
St Mary, Caernarfon	Caernarfon	Mary		Medieval	Church in Wales	Llanbeblig with Caernarfon	Grade I listed
St Peblig, Caernarfon	Caernarfon	Peblig, son of Elen		Medieval	Church in Wales	Llanbeblig with Caernarfon	Grade I listed
SS David & Helen, Caernarfon	Caernarfon	David of Wales & Elen			Roman Catholic	Bangor & Caernarfon Parish	
Capel Caersalem, Caernarfon	Caernarfon	Jerusalem		1815	Baptist Union		Building 1827, rebuilt 1869. Christmas Evans 1832-8
Capel Ebeneser, Caernarfon	Caernarfon	Eben-Ezer		1806	Methodist		Rebuilt 1825
Castle Square English Presbyterian Church	Caernarfon			1870s	Presbyterian		Current building 1882-1883
Capel Seilo, Caernarfon	Caernarfon	Shiloh		1856	Presbyterian		New building 1869, rebuilt 1900. New building 1976
Noddfa Community Church, Caernarfon	Caernarfon			1956	Presbyterian		Moved into community centre 1980s
Capel Joppa, Caernarfon	Caernarfon	Joppa		1841	Independent		Found in Coflein only; perhaps defunct
Capel Salem, Caernarfon	Caernarfon	Jerusalem		1862	Independent		Grade II listed
Caernarfon Pentecostal Church	Caernarfon				Salt and Light		
St Beuno, Clynnog Fawr	Clynnog	Beuno		Medieval	Church in Wales	Plwyf St Beuno	Grade I listed
Capel Ebeneser, Clynnog	Clynnog	Eben-Ezer		1844	Presbyterian		Rebuilt 1863
Capel Libanus, Pantglas	Clynnog (Pant Glas)	Mount Lebanon		1868	Presbyterian		
Capel Brynaerau, Pontllyfni	Clynnog (Pontllyfni)			pre-1901	Presbyterian		
Holy Trinity, Corris	Corris	Trinity			Church in Wales	Bro Cyfeiliog a Mawddwy	
Capel Salem, Corris	Corris	Jerusalem		1851	Independent		Rebuilt 1868, 1895. In use as of 2000s
St Catherine, Criccieth	Criccieth	Catherine of Alexandria		Medieval	Church in Wales	Bro Eifionydd	
Capel Berea, Criccieth	Criccieth	Berea		1790s	Baptist Union		Moved buildings 1866 from Capel Pen-y-maes
Capel y Traeth, Criccieth	Criccieth			1879	Presbyterian / UWI		Two churches (English & Welsh) worship together
Capel Jerwsalem, Criccieth	Criccieth	Jerusalem		1868	Independent		
Criccieth Family Church	Criccieth						
Goleudy Criccieth Community Church	Criccieth			2006	Independent/Evangelical Alliance		
St Mary, Dolbenmaen	Dolbenmaen	Mary		Medieval	Church in Wales	Bro Eifionydd	Previously a chapel of Penmorfa
Capel Soar, Bryncir	Dolbenmaen (Bryncir)	Zoara		1868	Presbyterian		
Capel Horeb, Garndolbenmaen	Dolbenmaen (Garndolbenmaen)	Mount Horeb		1786	Baptist Union		Rebuilt 1866, 1891
Capel Jerwsalem, Garndolbenmaen	Dolbenmaen (Garndolbenmaen)	Jerusalem		1780	Presbyterian		Rebuilt 1873, 1915
Capel Bethel, Golan	Dolbenmaen (Golan)	Bethel		1833	Presbyterian		
Capel Seion, Penmorfa	Dolbenmaen (Penmorfa)	Zion		1868	Independent		Found in Coflein only; perhaps defunct
Capel Tabor, Pentrefelin	Dolbenmaen (Pentrefelin)	Mount Tabor			Independent		Found in Coflein only; perhaps defunct
St Mary, Dolgellau	Dolgellau	Mary		Medieval	Church in Wales	Bro Cymer	Rebuilt 1716
Our Lady of Seven Sorrows, Dolgellau	Dolgellau	Mary		1930s	Roman Catholic	Dolgellau Parish	Building 1963-1970
Judah Welsh Baptist Church, Dolgellau	Dolgellau	Judah		1800	Baptist Union		Rebuilt 1839
Capel Ebeneser, Dolgellau	Dolgellau	Eben-Ezer		1805	Methodist		Rebuilt 1880
Capel Salem, Dolgellau	Dolgellau	Jerusalem		1766	Presbyterian		Rebuilt 1809, 1894
Capel Tabernacl, Dolgellau	Dolgellau	Tabernacle		1868	Independent		Found in Coflein only; perhaps defunct
Capel Tabor, Tabor	Dolgellau (Tabor)	Mount Tabor		pre-1847	Independent		Found in Coflein only; perhaps defunct
Capel Horeb, Dyffryn Ardudwy	Dyffryn Ardudwy	Mount Horeb		1790	Presbyterian		Rebuilt 1863, 1889
Capel Rehoboth, Coed Ystumgwern	Dyffryn Ardudwy (Coed Ystumgwern)	Rehoboth		1828	Independent		Rebuilt 1880. Found in Coflein only; perhaps defunct
St Dwywe, Llanddwywe	Dyffryn Ardudwy (Talybont)	Dwywe		Medieval	Church in Wales	Bro Ardudwy	
St David, Blaenau Ffestiniog	Ffestiniog (Blaenau Ffestiniog)	David of Wales		1842	Church in Wales	Bro Moelwyn	
St Mary Magdalene, Blaenau Ffestiniog	Ffestiniog (Blaenau Ffestiniog)	Mary Magdalene			Roman Catholic	Blaenau Ffestiniog & Gellilydan	
Capel y Bowydd, Blaenau Ffestiniog	Ffestiniog (Blaenau Ffestiniog)			1882	Presbyterian		
Capel Calfaria, Blaenau Ffestiniog	Ffestiniog (Blaenau Ffestiniog)	Calvary		1871	Baptist		Replaced Capel Soar 1881. In Llan acc. to BUW site
Capel Brynbowydd, Blaenau Ffestiniog	Ffestiniog (Blaenau Ffestiniog)			1882	Independent		Found in Coflein only; perhaps defunct
Capel Jerwsalem, Blaenau Ffestiniog	Ffestiniog (Blaenau Ffestiniog)	Jerusalem		1868	Independent		Found in Coflein only; perhaps defunct
St Michael, Llan Ffestiniog	Ffestiniog (Llan Ffestiniog)	Michael		Medieval	Church in Wales	Bro Moelwyn	Rebuilt 1843
Capel Bethel, Llan Ffestiniog	Ffestiniog (Llan Ffestiniog)	Bethel		1830	Independent		Replaced Capel Saron 1868. Coflein only; defunct?
Capel Cedron, Llan Ffestiniog	Ffestiniog (Llan Ffestiniog)	Kidron Valley		pre-1905	Independent		Found in Coflein only; perhaps defunct
Capel Pantycelyn, Llan Ffestiniog	Ffestiniog (Llan Ffestiniog)			pre-1905	Independent		Found in Coflein only; perhaps defunct
All Saints of Wales, Blaenau Ffestiniog	Ffestiniog (Manod)	Saints of Wales			Greek Orthodox		Meets in old CiW church of St Martha, Manod
Capel Bethesda, Manod	Ffestiniog (Manod)	Pool of Bethesda		1819	Presbyterian		New building 1848, 1870
Capel Hyfrydfa, Manod	Ffestiniog (Manod)				Independent		Replaced Capel Bethania 1879. Coflein only; defunct?
Capel Salem, Rhiwbryfdir	Ffestiniog (Rhiwbryfdir)	Jerusalem		1861	Independent		Found in Coflein only; perhaps defunct
Capel Carmel, Tanygrisiau	Ffestiniog (Tanygrisiau)	Mount Carmel		1835	Independent		Rebuilt 1862. Found in Coflein only; perhaps defunct
Capel Libanus, Ganllwyd	Ganllwyd	Mount Lebanon		pre-1851	Independent		Found in Coflein only; perhaps defunct
St Tanwg, Harlech	Harlech	Tanwg		1841	Church in Wales	Bro Ardudwy	Built to replace St Tanwg (Llandanwg), see below
St David in Zion, Harlech	Harlech	David of Wales		pre-1998	Roman Catholic	Harlech & Barmouth Parish	Meets in old Seion Methodist Chapel (built 1814)
Goleudy Church Harlech	Harlech			2022	Independent/Evangelical Alliance		
Capel Jerwsalem, Harlech	Harlech	Jerusalem		1881	Independent		
Rehoboth Baptist Chapel, Harlech	Harlech	Rehoboth		1820	Scotch Baptist	Still open for occasional services	
Capel Engedi, Harlech/Penrhiwgoch	Harlech (Penrhiwgoch)	Ein Gedi		1834	Scotch Baptist	Still open for occasional services	
St Aelhaearn, Llanaelhaearn	Llanaelhaearn	Aelhaiarn		Medieval	Church in Wales	Plwyf St Beuno	
Capel y Babell, Llanaelhaearn	Llanaelhaearn	Tabernacle		1876	Presbyterian		
Capel Bethlehem, Trefor	Llanaelhaearn (Trefor)	Bethlehem		1874	Independent		Found in Coflein only; perhaps defunct
Capel Maesyneuadd, Trefor	Llanaelhaearn (Trefor)			1812	Independent		Rebuilt 1880. Found in Coflein only; perhaps defunct
St Peter, Llanbedr	Llanbedr	Peter		Medieval	Church in Wales	Bro Ardudwy	Until 1845 a chapel of ease to Llandanwg
Capel y Ddôl, Llanbedr	Llanbedr	Moriah		1856	Presbyterian		Rebuilt 1913. Grade II listed
Capel Salem, Llanbedr	Llanbedr (Pentre Gwynfryn)	Jerusalem		1826-1851	Baptist Union		
St Pedrog, Llanbedrog	Llanbedrog	Pedroc		Medieval	Church in Wales	Bro Enlli	
Capel Rehoboth, Llanbedrog	Llanbedrog	Rehoboth		1816	Methodist		
Capel Peniel Newydd, Llanbedrog	Llanbedrog	Penuel		1791	Presbyterian		Rebuilt 1866. Chapel sold, services in former schoolroom
Capel Seion, Llanbedrog	Llanbedrog	Zion		1883	Independent		Found in Coflein only; perhaps defunct
Our Lady & St Cynfil Chapel, Penrhos	Llanbedrog (Penrhos)	Mary & Cynfil		c. 1964	Roman Catholic	Porthmadog & Pwllheli	Chapel of a care home for Polish people
St Padarn, Llanberis	Llanberis	Padarn		1884-1885	Church in Wales	Bro Eryri	
Capel Coch, Llanberis	Llanberis			1802	Presbyterian		Rebuilt 1834, 1846, 1864, 1893
Capel Jerwsalem, Llanberis	Llanberis	Jerusalem		1832	Independent		Found in Coflein only; perhaps defunct
St Peris, Nant Peris	Llanberis (Nant Peris)	Peris		Medieval	Church in Wales	Bro Eryri	
Capel Rehoboth, Nant Peris	Llanberis (Nant Peris)	Rehoboth		1833	Presbyterian		Rebuilt 1876
St Deiniolen, Llanddeiniolen	Llanddeiniolen	Deiniolen s. of Deiniol		Medieval	Church in Wales	Bro Eryri	Rebuilt 1843
Capel Saron, Bethel	Llanddeiniolen (Bethel)	Sharon Plain		1856	Methodist		
Capel Cysegr, Bethel	Llanddeiniolen (Bethel)			1864	Presbyterian	Glannau'r Saint Pastorate	
Capel Bethel, Bethel	Llanddeiniolen (Bethel)	Bethel		1813	Independent		Gave its name to the village
Capel Brynrefail	Llanddeiniolen (Brynrefail)			1839	Presbyterian		Building 1844
Capel Libanus, Clwt-y-bont	Llanddeiniolen (Clwt-y-bont)	Mount Lebanon		1877	Baptist Union		
Christ Church, Deiniolen	Llanddeiniolen (Deiniolen)	Jesus		1857	Church in Wales	Bro Eryri	
Capel Cefnywaun, Deiniolen	Llanddeiniolen (Deiniolen)			1838	Presbyterian		Rebuilt 1868
Capel Ebeneser, Deiniolen	Llanddeiniolen (Deiniolen)	Eben-Ezer		1823	Independent		Rebuilt 1858. Found in Coflein only; perhaps defunct
Capel Sardis, Dinorwig	Llanddeiniolen (Dinorwig)	Sardis		1820	Baptist Union		Rebuilt 1836. Closed. Church and adjoining chapel house sold in 2014.
St Helen, Penisa'r Waun	Llanddeiniolen (Penisa'r Waun)	Elen ?			Church in Wales	Bro Eryri	
Capel Bosra, Penisa'r Waun	Llanddeiniolen (Penisa'r Waun)	Bozrah		1841	Independent		Found in Coflein only; perhaps defunct
Capel Pisgah, Rhiwlas	Llanddeiniolen (Rhiwlas)	Mount Pisgah		1832	Methodist		
Capel Peniel, Rhiwlas	Llanddeiniolen (Rhiwlas)	Penuel		1831	Independent		Rebuilt 1865. Found in Coflein only; perhaps defunct
St Derfel, Llandderfel	Llandderfel	Derfel		Medieval	Church in Wales	Llandrillo-yn-Edeirnion, Llandderfel	Grade I listed. Famous as the cult site of St Derfel
Capel Saron, Llandderfel	Llandderfel	Sharon Plain		1814	Presbyterian		Rebuilt 1888
Capel Cefnddwysarn	Llandderfel (Cefnddwysarn)			1822	Presbyterian		New building pre-1890
Capel Cwmtirmynach	Llandderfel (Cwmtirmynach)			1826	Presbyterian		Rebuilt 1880
Capel Llawrybettws, Glan-yr-afon	Llandderfel (Glan-yr-afon)			1803	Presbyterian		Rebuilt 1865. Grade II listed
Capel Rhyd-y-wernen	Llandderfel (Rhyd-y-wernen)			1775	Independent		Rebuilt 1828. Found in Coflein only; perhaps defunct
Capel Soar, Tyn-y-bwlch	Llandderfel (Tyn-y-bwlch)	Zoara		1827	Independent		Rebuilt 1888. Found in Coflein only; perhaps defunct
St Twrog, Llandwrog	Llandwrog	Twrog		Medieval	Church in Wales	Plwyf St Beuno	Rebuilt 1856-1860
Capel Salem, Llandwrog	Llandwrog	Jerusalem		1856	Methodist		Rebuilt 1908
Capel Bwlan, Llandwrog	Llandwrog			1814	Presbyterian		Rebuilt 1841
Monastery of SS John the Baptist & George	Llandwrog (Carmel)	John Baptist & George			E. Orthodox		Was Pisgah Baptist chapel
Capel Carmel, Carmel	Llandwrog (Carmel)	Mount Carmel		1827	Presbyterian	Bro Lleu Pastorate	Rebuilt 1871
Chapel of SS John the Baptist & George	Llandwrog (Cilgwyn)	John Baptist & George			E. Orthodox		Monastery church, was Independent chapel
Capel Bwlch-y-llyn, Fron	Llandwrog (Fron)			1907	Independent		Found in Coflein only; perhaps defunct
Capel Brynrodyn, Groeslon	Llandwrog (Groeslon)			1773	Presbyterian	Bro Lleu Pastorate	Rebuilt 1869
St Tegai, Llandygai	Llandygai	Tegai		Medieval	Church in Wales	Bro Ogwen	
SS Anne & Mary, Tan-y-bwlch	Llandygai (Mynydd Llandygai)	Anne & Mary		1813	Church in Wales	Bro Ogwen	In converted school after St Ann's (reb. 1865) unsafe
St Mary, Tregarth	Llandygai (Tregarth)	Mary		1869	Church in Wales	Bro Ogwen	
Capel Seilo, Tregarth	Llandygai (Tregarth)	Shiloh		1829	Methodist		Rebuilt 1896
SS Mary & Egryn, Llanegryn	Llanegryn	Mary & Egryn		Medieval	Church in Wales	Bro Ystumanner	Grade I listed
Capel Peniel Newydd, Llanegryn	Llanegryn	Penuel		1811	Presbyterian		Rebuilt 1878. Sold and new building opened 2007
Capel Ebeneser, Llanegryn	Llanegryn	Eben-Ezer		1817	Independent		Rebuilt 1839. Found in Coflein only; perhaps defunct
St Illtyd, Llanelltyd	Llanelltyd	Illtud		Medieval	Church in Wales	Bro Cymer	
Capel Coffa, Llanelltyd	Llanelltyd			1802	Independent		Rebuilt 1924. Found in Coflein only; perhaps defunct
Capel Tiberias, Borthwnog	Llanelltyd (Borthwnog)	Sea of Galilee		pre-1905	Independent		Found in Coflein only; perhaps defunct
St Engan, Llanengan	Llanengan	Einion Frenin		Medieval	Church in Wales	Bro Enlli	Grade I listed
Capel y Bwlch, Llanengan	Llanengan			1806	Presbyterian		Rebuilt 1813, 1826, 1870
Capel Calfaria, Abersoch	Llanengan (Abersoch)	Calvary			Baptist Union		
Capel y Graig, Abersoch	Llanengan (Abersoch)			1904	Presbyterian		
Capel Abersoch	Llanengan (Abersoch)			1832	Independent		Found in Coflein only; perhaps defunct
Capel Bwlchtocyn	Llanengan (Bwlchtocyn)			1796	Independent		Found in Coflein only; perhaps defunct
St Cian, Llangian	Llanengan (Llangian)	Cían		Medieval	Church in Wales	Bro Enlli	
Capel Smyrna, Llangian	Llanengan (Llangian)	Smyrna		1878	Presbyterian		
Capel Carmel, Mynytho	Llanengan (Mynytho)	Mount Carmel		1840	Methodist		Rebuilt 1878
Capel Horeb, Mynytho	Llanengan (Mynytho)	Mount Horeb		1821	Independent		Rebuilt 1895. Found in Coflein only; perhaps defunct
Capel y Nant, Nanhoron	Llanengan (Nanhoron)			1788	Presbyterian		Rebuilt 1877
Capel Newydd, Nanhoron	Llanengan (Nanhoron)			1770-1772	Independent		Oldest surviving nonconformist chapel in north Wales
St Mary, Llanfair	Llanfair	Mary		Medieval	Church in Wales	Bro Ardudwy	
Capel Caersalem, Llanfair	Llanfair	Jerusalem		1863	Baptist Union		On BUW site but disused according to Coflein
St Tanwg, Llandanwg	Llanfair (Llandanwg)	Tanwg		Medieval	Church in Wales	Bro Ardudwy	Grade I listed. Abandoned 1845, restored 1884
St Michael, Llanfihangel-y-Pennant	Llanfihangel-y-Pennant	Michael		Medieval	Church in Wales	Bro Ystumanner	
St David, Abergynolwyn	Llanfih.-y-Pennant (Abergynolwyn)	David of Wales		1879-1880	Church in Wales	Bro Ystumanner	
Capel Ty'n Ddôl, Abergynolwyn	Llanfih.-y-Pennant (Abergynolwyn)			1806	Presbyterian		Rebuilt 1866
Capel Cwrt, Abergynolwyn	Llanfih.-y-Pennant (Abergynolwyn)			1878	Independent		Found in Coflein only; perhaps defunct
St Celynnin, Llwyngwril	Llangelynnin (Llwyngwril)	Celynin		1841-1843	Church in Wales	Bro Cymer	
Capel Peniel, Llwyngwril	Llangelynnin (Llwyngwril)	Penuel		1807	Independent		Found in Coflein only; perhaps defunct
Capel Rhos-y-gwaliau	Llangywer (Rhos-y-gwaliau)				Presbyterian		
Capel Carmel, Rachub	Llanllechid (Rachub)	Mount Carmel		1839	Independent		Rebuilt 1860. Found in Coflein only; perhaps defunct
Holy Cross, Tal-y-bont	Llanllechid (Tal-y-bont)	Cross		1892	Church in Wales	Bro Ogwen	
Capel Bethlehem, Tal-y-bont	Llanllechid (Tal-y-bont)	Bethlehem		1825	Independent		Rebuilt 1860. Found in Coflein only; perhaps defunct
Capel Saron, Ty'n-y-maes	Llanllechid (Ty'n-y-maes)	Sharon Plain		1861	Independent		Found in Coflein only; perhaps defunct
St Rhedyw, Llanllyfni	Llanllyfni	Rhedyw		Medieval	Church in Wales	Plwyf St Beuno	
Capel Ebeneser, Llanllyfni	Llanllyfni	Eben-Ezer			Baptist Union		
Capel Moreia, Llanllyfni	Llanllyfni	Moriah		1869	Independent		Found in Coflein only; perhaps defunct
Capel Baladeulyn, Nantlle	Llanllyfni (Nantlle)				Presbyterian	Bro Lleu Pastorate	
Christ Church, Penygroes	Llanllyfni (Penygroes)	Jesus		pre-1890	Church in Wales	Plwyf St Beuno	Current building 1890
Capel Calfaria, Penygroes	Llanllyfni (Penygroes)	Calvary			Baptist Union		
Capel y Groes, Penygroes	Llanllyfni (Penygroes)	Cross			Presbyterian	Bro Lleu Pastorate	
Capel Soar, Penygroes	Llanllyfni (Penygroes)	Zoara			Independent		Coflein only. Demolished 80s, services in vestry. Defunct?
St John, Talysarn	Llanllyfni (Talysarn)	John ?		late C19th	Church in Wales	Plwyf St Beuno	
Capel Seion, Talysarn	Llanllyfni (Talysarn)	Zion		1802	Independent		Found in Coflein only; perhaps defunct
Holy Cross, Llannor	Llannor	Cross		Medieval	Church in Wales	Bro Enlli	
St Cawrdaf, Abererch	Llannor (Abererch)	Cawrdaf		Medieval	Church in Wales	Bro Eifionydd	Grade I listed
Capel Isaf, Abererch	Llannor (Abererch)				Presbyterian		
Capel Ebeneser, Abererch	Llannor (Abererch)	Eben-Ezer		1822	Independent		Rebuilt 1868. Found in Coflein only; perhaps defunct
Capel Berea, Efailnewydd	Llannor (Efailnewydd)	Berea			Presbyterian		
Capel Llwyndyrus	Llannor (Llwyndyrys)				Presbyterian		
Capel Bethel, Penrhos	Llannor (Penrhos)	Bethel			Presbyterian		
Capel Pentreuchaf	Llannor (Pentreuchaf)				Presbyterian		
Capel Ebeneser, Y Ffôr	Llannor (Y Ffôr)	Eben-Ezer			Presbyterian		
Capel Salem, Y Ffôr	Llannor (Y Ffôr)	Jerusalem		1863	Independent		Found in Coflein only; perhaps defunct
St Michael, Llanrug	Llanrug	Michael			Church in Wales	Bro Eryri	
Capel y Rhos, Llanrug	Llanrug				Presbyterian	Glannau'r Saint Pastorate	
Capel Bryngwyn, Llanrug	Llanrug			1837	Independent		Rebuilt 1870. Found in Coflein only; perhaps defunct
Capel Tabernacl, Cwm-y-glo	Llanrug (Cwm-y-glo)	Tabernacle		1851	Independent		Rebuilt 1865. Found in Coflein only; perhaps defunct
Capel Ainon, Llanuwchllyn	Llanuwchllyn	Ænon			Baptist Union		
Capel Glanaber, Llanuwchllyn	Llanuwchllyn				Presbyterian	Llanuwchllyn Area Pastorate	
Capel Cynllwyd	Llanuwchllyn (Cwm Cynllwyd)				Presbyterian		
Capel Soar, Dolddeuli	Llanuwchllyn (Dolddeuli)	Zoara		1841	Independent		Found in Coflein only; perhaps defunct
Capel Carmel, Dolhendre	Llanuwchllyn (Dolhendre)	Mount Carmel		1833	Independent		Rebuilt 1893. Found in Coflein only; perhaps defunct
Capel Peniel, Rhosdylluan	Llanuwchllyn (Rhosdylluan)	Penuel		1829	Independent		Rebuilt 1895. Found in Coflein only; perhaps defunct
Hen Gapel (Ebeneser), Werglodd	Llanuwchllyn (Werglodd)	Eben-Ezer		1746	Independent		Rebuilt 1810, 1871. Coflein only; defunct? Grade II listed
St Gwyndaf, Llanwnda	Llanwnda	Gwyndaf		Medieval	Church in Wales	Plwyf St Beuno	Rebuilt 1847
Capel Glanrhyd, Llanwnda	Llanwnda			1899	Presbyterian	Bro Lleu Pastorate	
Capel Bethsaida, Llanwnda	Llanwnda	Bethsaida		1826	Independent		Found in Coflein only; perhaps defunct
Capel Gorffwysfa, Pen-y-ffridd	Llanwnda (Pen-y-ffridd)			1903	Independent		Found in Coflein only; perhaps defunct
Capel Horeb, Rhostryfan	Llanwnda (Rhostryfan)	Mount Horeb			Presbyterian	Bro Lleu Pastorate	
Capel Tabernacl, Rhostryfan	Llanwnda (Rhostryfan)	Tabernacle		1866	Independent		Found in Coflein only; perhaps defunct
Capel Saron, Saron	Llanwnda (Saron)	Sharon Plain		1812	Independent		Rebuilt 1863. Found in Coflein only; perhaps defunct
Capel Llidiardau	Llanycil (Llidiardau)				Presbyterian		
Capel Parc	Llanycil (Parc)				Presbyterian	Thomas Charles Area Pastorate	
Capel Talybont, Rhyd-uchaf	Llanycil (Rhyd-uchaf)			1837	Presbyterian		
St John the Baptist, Llanystumdwy	Llanystumdwy	John the Baptist		pre-C19th	Church in Wales	Bro Eifionydd	Rebuilt 1819, 1862
Capel Moreia, Llanystumdwy	Llanystumdwy	Moriah			Presbyterian		
Capel Uchaf, Chwilog	Llanystumdwy (Chwilog)				Presbyterian / UWI		Two churches worship together since 2011.
Capel Siloh, Chwilog	Llanystumdwy (Chwilog)	Shiloh		1835	Independent		Rebuilt 1869. Found in Coflein only; perhaps defunct
St Garmon, Llanarmon	Llanystumdwy (Llanarmon)	Germanus of Auxerre		Medieval	Church in Wales	Bro Eifionydd	
St Cybi, Llangybi	Llanystumdwy (Llangybi)	Cybi		Medieval	Church in Wales	Bro Eifionydd	
Capel Pantglas, Llangybi	Llanystumdwy (Llangybi)			1836	Independent		Found in Coflein only; perhaps defunct
Capel Sardis, Llangybi	Llanystumdwy (Llangybi)	Sardis		1820	Independent		Found in Coflein only; perhaps defunct
Capel Helyg, Llangybi	Llanystumdwy (Llangybi)			1652	Independent		Rebuilt 1834, 1877. Coflein only; perhaps defunct
Capel Pencaenewydd	Llanystumdwy (Pencaenewydd)				Presbyterian		
Capel-y-Beirdd	Llanystumdwy (Ynys, nr Rhoslan)				Baptist Union		
Capel Brynengan	Llanystumdwy (Ynys Creua)				Presbyterian		
SS Twrog & Mary, Maentwrog	Maentwrog	Twrog & Mary		Ancient	Church in Wales	Bro Moelwyn	Rebuilt 1896. Grade II listed
Capel Glanywern, Maentwrog	Maentwrog			1810	Independent		Found in Coflein only; perhaps defunct
Capel Gilgal, Maentwrog	Maentwrog	Gilgal		1841	Independent		Found in Coflein only; perhaps defunct
Holy Cross, Gellilydan	Maentwrog (Gellilydan)	Cross		1952	Roman Catholic	Blaenau Ffestiniog & Gellilydan	Building (converted, Grade II) former tannery
Capel Maentwrog Uchaf, Gellilydan	Maentwrog (Gellilydan)				Presbyterian		
Capel Utica	Maentwrog (Utica)			1843	Independent		Rebuilt 1897. Found in Coflein only; perhaps defunct
Capel Horeb, Aberangell	Mawddwy (Aberangell)	Mount Horeb		1899	Independent		Active as of 2000s
Capel Ebeneser, Dinas Mawddwy	Mawddwy (Dinas Mawddwy)	Eben-Ezer		1795	Independent		Rebuilt 1832, 1868. Active as of 2015
St Tydecho, Mallwyd	Mawddwy (Mallwyd)	Tydecho		Medieval	Church in Wales	Bro Cyfeiliog a Mawddwy	Grade II listed
Capel Bethsaida, Mallwyd	Mawddwy (Mallwyd)	Bethsaida		1821	Independent		Found in Coflein only; perhaps defunct
St David, Nefyn	Nefyn	David of Wales		1903-1904	Church in Wales	Bro Madryn	
Capel Isaf, Nefyn	Nefyn				Presbyterian		
Capel Soar, Pen-y-bryn	Nefyn	Zoara		1828	Independent		Rebuilt 1880
St Edern, Edern	Nefyn (Edern)	Edeyrn			Church in Wales	Bro Madryn	Rebuilt 1867-1868
Capel Edern	Nefyn (Edern)				Presbyterian		
Capel Moreia, Morfa Nefyn	Nefyn (Morfa Nefyn)	Moriah			Presbyterian		
St Peter ad Vincula, Pennal	Pennal	Peter		Ancient	Church in Wales	Bro Ystumanner	Grade II listed
Capel Pennal	Pennal				Presbyterian		
Holy Trinity, Penrhyndeudraeth	Penrhyndeudraeth	Trinity		1858	Church in Wales	Bro Moelwyn	
Capel Bethel, Penrhyndeudraeth	Penrhyndeudraeth	Bethel			Baptist Union		
Penrhyn Methodist Church	Penrhyndeudraeth				Methodist		
Capel Nasareth, Penrhyndeudraeth	Penrhyndeudraeth	Nazareth		1777	Presbyterian		
Capel Fron, Penrhyndeudraeth	Penrhyndeudraeth				FIEC		
St Cedol, Pentir	Pentir	Cedol		1848	Church in Wales	Bro Ogwen	
Capel Bethmaca, Glasinfryn	Pentir (Glasinfryn)	?		1836	Independent		Rebuilt 1866, 1895. Coflein only; perhaps defunct
St Peter, Penrhosgarnedd	Pentir (Penrhosgarnedd)	Peter		1956	Church in Wales	Bro Deiniol	
Capel Beula, Penrhosgarnedd	Pentir (Penrhosgarnedd)	Beulah		1836	Independent		Rebuilt 1872. Found in Coflein only; perhaps defunct
St Beuno, Pistyll	Pistyll	Beuno		Medieval	Church in Wales	Bro Madryn	Grade I listed
Capel Llithfaen	Pistyll (Llithfaen)				Presbyterian		
St John, Porthmadog	Porthmadog	John ?		1873-1876	Church in Wales	Bro Eifionydd	
Most Holy Redeemer, Porthmadog	Porthmadog	Jesus		1933	Roman Catholic	Porthmadog & Pwllheli	
Capel y Porth, Porthmadog	Porthmadog				Presbyterian		
Capel Salem, Porthmadog	Porthmadog	Jerusalem		1827	Independent		Rebuilt 1860. Grade II listed. Seemingly still active
St Cyngar, Borth-y-Gest	Porthmadog (Borth-y-Gest)	Cyngar of Llangefni		1913	Church in Wales	Bro Eifionydd	
Capel Bethel, Borth-y-Gest	Porthmadog (Borth-y-Gest)	Bethel		1866	Independent		
Capel Siloam, Morfa Bychan	Porthmadog (Morfa Bychan)	Pool of Siloam		1856	Independent		Rebuilt 1902. Found in Coflein only; perhaps defunct
St Michael, Treflys	Porthmadog (nr Morfa Bychan)	Michael		Medieval	Church in Wales	Bro Eifionydd	
Peniel Chapel, Tremadog	Porthmadog (Tremadog)	Penuel		1808-1810	Presbyterian		Grade I building sold 2010, meets in Memorial Hall
St Peter, Pwllheli	Pwllheli	Peter		1832-1834	Church in Wales	Bro Enlli	Current building 1886-1887
St Joseph, Pwllheli	Pwllheli	Joseph			Roman Catholic	Porthmadog & Pwllheli	
Capel Tabernacl, Pwllheli	Pwllheli	Tabernacle		1815	Baptist Union		Rebuilt 1861
Capel Seion, Pwllheli	Pwllheli	Zion		1861	Methodist		Rebuilt 1880. On MC website but disused acc. to Coflein
Capel y Drindod, Pwllheli	Pwllheli	Trinity			Presbyterian		
Ala Road English Presbyterian Church	Pwllheli			1894	Presbyterian		
Capel Pen-lan, Pwllheli	Pwllheli			1672	Independent		Rebuilt a number of times. Still active
Capel Soar, Talsarnau	Talsarnau	Zoara			Methodist		Closed 2018
Capel Newydd, Talsarnau	Talsarnau				FIEC		
Talsarnau Independent Chapel	Talsarnau			1867	Independent		Now used as a saw-mill
St Tecwyn, Llandecwyn	Talsarnau (Llandecwyn)	Tecwyn		Medieval	Church in Wales	Bro Ardudwy	
Capel Bryn Tecwyn, Llandecwyn	Talsarnau (Llandecwyn)				Presbyterian		Closed 2018
St Michael, Llanfihangel-y-traethau	Talsarnau (Llanfihangel-y-traethau)	Michael		pre-C19th	Church in Wales	Bro Ardudwy	
St Madryn, Trawsfynydd	Trawsfynydd	Madryn		Medieval	Church in Wales	Bro Moelwyn	
Capel Moreia, Trawsfynydd	Trawsfynydd	Moriah			Presbyterian		
Capel Jerwsalem, Trawsfynydd	Trawsfynydd	Jerusalem		1826	Independent		Rebuilt 1893. Found in Coflein only; perhaps defunct
Capel Cwm Prysor	Trawsfynydd (Cwm Prysor)				Presbyterian		
Capel Pen-y-stryd, Trawsfynydd	Trawsfynydd (Pen-y-stryd)			1789	Independent		Rebuilt 1890. Found in Coflein only; perhaps defunct
St Cwyfan, Tudweiliog	Tudweiliog	Cwyfan		Medieval	Church in Wales	Bro Madryn	Rebuilt 1849
Capel Tudweiliog	Tudweiliog				Presbyterian		
Capel Garnfadryn	Tudweiliog (Garnfadryn)				Presbyterian		
St Tudwen, Llandudwen	Tudweiliog (Llandudwen)	Tudwen			Church in Wales	Bro Madryn	
St Gwynhoedl, Llangwnadl	Tudweiliog (Llangwnnadl)	Gwynhoedl		Medieval	Church in Wales	Bro Madryn	Grade I listed
St Iestyn, Llaniestyn	Tudweiliog (Llaniestyn)	Iestyn		Medieval	Church in Wales	Bro Madryn	Grade I listed
Capel Dinas, Llaniestyn	Tudweiliog (Llaniestyn)				Presbyterian		
St Cadfan, Tywyn	Tywyn	Cadfan		Ancient	Church in Wales	Bro Ystumanner	Grade I listed
St David, Tywyn	Tywyn	David of Wales		1966-1969	Roman Catholic	Tywyn & Machynlleth	Congregation may be older
Tywyn English Baptist Church	Tywyn				Baptist Union GB		
Capel Ebeneser, Dolgellau	Tywyn	Eben-Ezer			Methodist		
Capel Bethel, Tywyn	Tywyn	Bethel		1815	Presbyterian		Rebuilt 1871
Eglwys y Waun, Waunfawr	Waunfawr				Presbyterian		
Capel Caeathro	Waunfawr (Caeathro)			1824	Presbyterian	Glannau'r Saint Pastorate	Rebuilt early 1900s
St Mary, Y Felinheli	Y Felinheli	Mary		1865	Church in Wales	Llanfair-is-gaer	
Capel Bethania, Y Felinheli	Y Felinheli	Bethany			Presbyterian		
Capel Brynmenai, Y Felinheli	Y Felinheli			1866	Independent		Found in Coflein only; perhaps defunct
St Mary, Llanfair-is-gaer	Y Felinheli (Llanfair-is-gaer)	Mary		Medieval	Church in Wales	Llanfair-is-gaer	
Capel Siloh, Port Dinorwic	Y Felinheli (Port Dinorwic)	Shiloh		1834	Independent		Found in Coflein only; perhaps defunct

== Defunct churches ==
Churches that are known for a fact to be defunct are only included here if they are Church in Wales or Roman Catholic. Details of closed Nonconformist chapels can be found in the Coflein register.

Name	Community (settlement)	Dedication	Web	Founded	Redundant	Denomination	Notes
St Bodfan, Abergwyngregyn	Abergwyngregyn	Bodfan		pre-C19th		Church in Wales	Rebuilt 1878. Not on CiW website; presumably defunct
Capel Salem, Aberdaron	Aberdaron			1858		Methodist	Rebuilt 1898. Not on MC website; presumably defunct
Capel Enlli	Aberdaron (Bardsey Island)			1875		Presbyterian	Not on PCW website; presumably defunct
Capel Carmel, Capel Carmel	Aberdaron (Capel Carmel)	Mount Carmel		1818		Baptist	Not on BUW website; presumably defunct
Capel Penycaerau	Aberdaron (Penycaerau)			1878		Presbyterian	Not on PCW website; presumably defunct
Capel Saron, Rhoshirwaun	Aberdaron (Rhoshirwaun)	Sharon Plain		1903		Presbyterian	Not on PCW website; presumably defunct
Capel Rhydlios	Aberdaron (Rhydlios)			1904		Presbyterian	Not on PCW website; presumably defunct
Capel Horeb, Uwchmynydd	Aberdaron (Uwchmynydd)	Mount Horeb		1901		Methodist	Not on MC website; presumably defunct
St Aelrhiw, Y Rhiw	Aberdaron (Y Rhiw)	Aelrhiw		Medieval	recent	Church in Wales	Present structure C18th. Grade II listed
Capel Pisgah, Y Rhiw	Aberdaron (Y Rhiw)	Mount Pisgah		1832		Methodist	Building 1834, rebuilt 1877. Not on MC website; presumably defunct
Capel Tan-y-Foel, Y Rhiw	Aberdaron (Y Rhiw)			1832		Presbyterian	Rebuilt 1876. Now a house
Capel Galltraeth, Y Rhiw	Aberdaron (Y Rhiw)				1949	Baptist	
Christ the King, Aberdyfi	Aberdyfi	Jesus		1932	2016	Roman Catholic	First building 1942
Barmouth Junction Baptist Chapel	Arthog			1905		Baptist	Not on BUW website; presumably defunct
Capel Seion, Arthog	Arthog	Zion		1806		Presbyterian	Rebuilt 1868. Not on PCW website; presumably defunct
Friog English Presbyterian Church	Arthog (Friog)			pre-1905		Presbyterian	Not on PCW website; presumably defunct
Capel Saron, Friog	Arthog (Friog)	Sharon Plain		1925		Presbyterian	Not on PCW website; presumably defunct
Capel Salim, Bala	Bala	Salim		1835		Baptist	Rebuilt 1859. Not on BUW website; presumably defunct
Capel Ebeneser, Bala	Bala	Eben-Ezer		1835		Methodist	Not on MC website; presumably defunct
Capel Soar, Bala	Bala	Zoara				Presbyterian	Not on PCW website; presumably defunct
St Mary, Bangor	Bangor	Mary		1864	2014	Church in Wales	
St James, Bangor	Bangor	James		1866	pre-1996	Church in Wales	Building now used by Catholics
Capel Glan-Adda, Bangor	Bangor					Baptist	Not on BUW website; presumably defunct
Capel Seion, Bangor	Bangor	Zion		1857		Methodist	Rebuilt 1878-1879. Not on MC website; presumably defunct
Capel Pendref, Bangor	Bangor			1882		Independent	For sale 2017
Capel Seion, Barmouth	Barmouth	Zion		1876		Baptist	Not on BUW website; presumably defunct
Capel Ebeneser, Barmouth	Barmouth	Eben-Ezer		1806		Methodist	Rebuilt 1856. Not on MC website; presumably defunct
Capel Bethel, Barmouth	Barmouth	Bethel		pre-1905		Presbyterian	Not on PCW website; presumably defunct
Park Road Chapel, Barmouth	Barmouth			1893		Presbyterian	Rebuilt 1915. Not on PCW website; presumably defunct
Capel Siloam, Barmouth	Barmouth	Pool of Siloam		1828		Independent	Rebuilt 1870. Building has 'found new use' - local website
Capel Parsel, Llanaber	Barmouth (Llanaber)			1800		Presbyterian	Not on PCW website; presumably defunct
Capel Maesgeirchen	Bangor (Maesgeirchen)			1952		Presbyterian	Not on PCW website; presumably defunct
St Philip, Caerdeon	Barmouth (Caerdeon)	Philip		1862		Church in Wales	Consecrated 1875. Occasional services still held
Capel Beddgelert	Beddgelert			1794		Presbyterian	Not on PCW website; presumably defunct
Capel Bethania, Bethania	Beddgelert (Nant Gwynant)	Bethany		1822		Presbyterian	Rebuilt 1867. Not on PCW website; presumably defunct
Capel Carneddi	Bethesda			1816		Presbyterian	Rebuilt 1828, 1868. Not on PCW website; presumably defunct
SS Pius X & Richard Gwyn, Bethesda	Bethesda	Pope Pius X & Richard Gwyn		1961	2016	Roman Catholic	One of six Roman Catholic churches closed in Gwynedd in 2016
Capel Bethania, Bethesda	Bethesda	Bethany		1885	2015	Independent	Grade II listed
Capel Salem, Rachub	Bethesda (Rachub)	Jerusalem		1837		Methodist	Rebuilt 1876. Not on MC website; presumably defunct
Capel Rhyd Ddu	Betws Garmon (Rhyd Ddu)					Baptist	Not on BUW website; presumably defunct
Capel Siloam, Bontnewydd	Bontnewydd			1840		Presbyterian	Rebuilt 1877, 1896. Not on PCW website; presumably defunct
St Baglan, Llanfaglan	Bontnewydd (Llanfaglan)	Baglan		Medieval	pre-1991	Church in Wales	Grade I listed. Friends of Friendless Churches 1991
Capel Pen-y-graig	Bontnewydd (Llanfaglan)			1863		Presbyterian	Not on PCW website; presumably defunct
Capel Bethel, Bryncroes	Botwnnog (Bryncroes)	Bethel		1879	pre-2010	Independent	Now a house
Capel Bryn-mawr	Botwnnog (Bryn-mawr)			1877		Presbyterian	Not on PCW website; presumably defunct
Capel Gallt-traeth	Botwnnog (Gallt-traeth)			1893		Baptist	Not on BUW website; presumably defunct
St Gwynnin, Llanndegwning	Botwnnog (Llandegwning)	Gwynnin		pre-1840		Church in Wales	Rebuilt 1840. Not on CiW website; presumably defunct
Capel Neigwl	Botwnnog (Llandegwning)			1887		Presbyterian	Not on PCW website; presumably defunct
St Peter ad Vincula, Botwnnog	Botwnnog (Sarn Meyllteyrn)	Peter		pre-1846		Church in Wales	Rebuilt 1846. Not on CiW website; presumably defunct
St Mark, Brithdir	Brithdir & Llanfachreth (Brithdir)	Mark		1895-1898		Church in Wales	Grade I listed. Friends of Friendless Churches
Capel Rhiwspardyn, Brithdir	Brithdir & Llanfachreth (Brithdir)			1912		Presbyterian	Not on PCW website; presumably defunct
Capel Siloh, Bryn-coed-ifor	Brithdir & Llanfachreth (Bryn-coed-ifor)	Shiloh		1841		Presbyterian	Rebuilt 1874. Not on PCW website; presumably defunct
Capel Hermon, Capel Hermon	Brithdir & Llanfachreth (Capel Hermon)	Mount Hermon		1865		Presbyterian	Not on PCW website; presumably defunct
Capel Bethel, Llanfachreth	Brithdir & Llanfachreth (Llanfachreth)	Bethel		1804		Presbyterian	Rebuilt 1868. Not on PCW website; presumably defunct
Capel Carmel, Ffridd Carmel	Brithdir & Llanfachreth (Ystumgwadnaeth)	Mount Carmel		1834		Presbyterian	Not on PCW website; presumably defunct
St Matthew, Bryncrug	Bryn-crug	Matthew		1880-1882		Church in Wales	Not on CiW website; presumably defunct
St Buan, Boduan	Buan (Boduan)	Buan		Medieval		Church in Wales	Rebuilt c1790, restored 1891. Not on CiW website; presumably defunct
St Ceidio, Ceidio	Buan (Ceidio)	Ceidio		Medieval		Church in Wales	Not on CiW website; presumably defunct
St Tudwen, Llandudwen	Buan (Llandudwen)	Tudwen		Medieval		Church in Wales	Not on CiW website; presumably defunct
St Michael, Llanfihangel Bachellaeth	Buan (Llanfihangel Bachellaeth)	Michael		pre-C17th		Church in Wales	Not on CiW website; presumably defunct
Capel Rhyd-y-clafdy	Buan (Rhyd-y-clafdy)			1768		Presbyterian	Rebuilt 1881. Not on PCW website; presumably defunct
Capel Graigwen	Buan (nr Rhyd-y-clafdy)			1906		Presbyterian	Not on PCW website; presumably defunct
Christ Church, Caernarfon	Caernarfon	Jesus		1862-1864	1982	Church in Wales	Designed by Anthony Salvin. Now an activity centre
Capel Beulah, Caernarfon	Caernarfon	Beulah		1886		Presbyterian	Not on PCW website; presumably defunct
Capel Moreia, Caernarfon	Caernarfon	Moriah				Presbyterian	Not on PCW website; presumably defunct
Capel Pen-Dref, Caernarfon	Caernarfon			1791	pre-2012	Independent	Rebuilt 1822, 1838, 1862. Sold for housing c. 2012
Capel Uchaf, Capel Uchaf	Clynnog (Capel Uchaf)			1764		Presbyterian	Rebuilt 1811, 1870. Not on PCW website; presumably defunct
Capel Seion, Gyrn Goch	Clynnog (Gyrn Goch)	Zion		1826		Presbyterian	Rebuilt 1875. Not on PCW website; presumably defunct
Capel Bwlchyderwydd	Clynnog (Llanllyfni)			mid C19th		Presbyterian	Not on PCW website; presumably defunct
Capel Rehoboth, Corris	Corris	Rehoboth		1813		Presbyterian	Rebuilt 1834, 1869, 1925. Not on PCW website; presumably defunct
Ty Capel, Aberllefenni	Corris (Aberllefenni)			1839		?	Rebuilt 1874. Not on MC or PCW websites; presumably defunct
Capel Pantperthog	Corris (Pantperthog)			pre-1905		Presbyterian	Not on PCW website; presumably defunct
St Deiniol, Criccieth	Criccieth	Deiniol		1884-1887	1988	Church in Wales	Converted into flats 1994
Holy Spirit, Criccieth	Criccieth	Holy Spirit			2016	Roman Catholic	
Capel Seion, Criccieth	Criccieth	Zion		1809		Methodist	Rebuilt 1869. Not on MC website; presumably defunct
Capel Saron, Cwmystradllyn	Dolbenmaen (Cwmystradllyn)	Sharon Plain		1885		Presbyterian	Building 1888. Not on PCW website; presumably defunct
St David, Garndolbenmaen	Dolbenmaen (Garndolbenmaen)	David of Wales		1898-1900		Church in Wales	Not on CiW website; presumably defunct
Capel Ainon, Golan	Dolbenmaen (Golan)	Ænon		1862		Baptist	Not on BUW website; presumably defunct
St Michael, Llanfihangel-y-Pennant	Dolbenmaen (Llanfihangel-y-Pennant)	Michael		pre-C17th		Church in Wales	Not on CiW website; presumably defunct
St Beuno, Penmorfa	Dolbenmaen (Penmorfa)	Beuno		Ancient		Church in Wales	Friends of Friendless Churches 1999
Capel Bethel, Penmorfa	Dolbenmaen (Penmorfa)	Bethel		1891		Presbyterian	Not on PCW website; presumably defunct
St Cynhaearn, Ynyscynhaearn	Dolbenmaen (Pentrefelin)	Cynhaearn		Medieval		Church in Wales	Friends of Friendless Churches 2003. Rebuilt 1832. Originally Porthmadog parish church
Capel Cedron, Pentrefelin	Dolbenmaen (Pentrefelin)			1867		Presbyterian	Not on PCW website; presumably defunct
English Presbyterian Chapel, Dolgellau	Dolgellau					Presbyterian	Not on PCW website; presumably defunct
Capel Rhiwspardyn, Cross Foxes	Dolgellau (Cross Foxes)			1828		Presbyterian	Rebuilt 1868. Not on PCW website; presumably defunct
Capel Ty'n Drain	Dyffryn Ardudwy					Presbyterian	Not on PCW website; presumably defunct
St Enddwyn, Llanenddwyn	Dyffryn Ardudwy (Llanenddwyn)	Enddwyn		Medieval		Church in Wales	Grade II listed. Not on CiW website; presumably defunct
Capel Seion, Blaenau Ffestiniog	Ffestiniog (Blaenau Ffestiniog)	Zion		1864		Baptist	Rebuilt 1879. Not on BUW website; presumably defunct
Capel Maenofferen, Blaenau Ffestiniog	Ffestiniog (Blaenau Ffestiniog)			1903		Presbyterian	Not on PCW website; presumably defunct
Capel Frongoch, Cae-Clyd	Ffestiniog (Cae-Clyd)					Baptist	Not on BUW website; presumably defunct
Capel Peniel, Llan Ffestiniog	Ffestiniog (Llan Ffestiniog)	Penuel		1839		Presbyterian	Grade II listed. Not on PCW website; presumably defunct
St Martha, Manod	Ffestiniog (Manod)	Martha		1871		Church in Wales	Building c. 1880. Not on CiW website; presumably defunct
Capel Disgwylfa, Manod	Ffestiniog (Manod)			1899		Methodist	Not on MC website; presumably defunct
Capel Salem, Tanygrisiau	Ffestiniog (Tanygrisiau)	Jerusalem		1861		Baptist	Not on BUW website; presumably defunct
Capel Seilo, Tanygrisiau	Ffestiniog (Tanygrisiau)	Shiloh		1830		Methodist	Rebuilt 1871. Not on MC website; presumably defunct
Capel Trawsnant, Ganllwyd	Ganllwyd					Independent	Single line entry in Coflein only; presumably defunct
Capel Tabernacl, Harlech	Harlech	Tabernacle		1875		Baptist	Replaced Capel Ainon 1897. Closed in the 1990s
Capel Bethel, Harlech	Harlech	Bethel		1880		Baptist	Now a private house
Capel Llechwedd, Harlech	Harlech			pre-1905		Presbyterian	Now a private house
Capel Moreia, Harlech	Harlech	Moriah		1794		Presbyterian	Rebuilt 1837, 1864. Now a private house
Capel Llechwedd Du, Harlech	Harlech (Morfa Harlech)			1909		Presbyterian	Now a private house
Capel Cwmcoryn	Llanaelhaearn (Cwmcoryn)			1811		Presbyterian	Rebuilt 1871. Not on PCW website; presumably defunct
St George, Trefor	Llanaelhaearn (Trefor)	George		1879-1881		Church in Wales	Not on CiW website; presumably defunct
Capel Bethania, Trefor	Llanaelhaearn (Trefor)	Bethany		1896		Baptist	Not on BUW website; presumably defunct
Capel Gosen, Trefor	Llanaelhaearn (Trefor)	Goshen		1875		Presbyterian	Not on PCW website; presumably defunct
Capel Cwm Nantcol	Llanbedr (Cwm Nantcol)			1839		Presbyterian	Not on PCW website; presumably defunct
Capel Gwynfryn, Pentre Gwynfryn	Llanbedr (Pentre Gwynfryn)			1810		Presbyterian	Rebuilt 1961. Not on PCW website; presumably defunct
Tan Capel, Llanbedrog	Llanbedrog					Presbyterian	Not on PCW website; presumably defunct
St John Jones, Llanberis	Llanberis	John Jones			2016	Roman Catholic	Met since after 1979 in old Bethel Methodist chapel
Capel Seion, Llanberis	Llanberis	Zion		1869		Baptist	Not on BUW website; presumably defunct
Capel Bethel, Llanberis	Llanberis	Bethel		1873		Methodist	Not on MC website; presumably defunct
Capel Preswylfa, Llanberis	Llanberis			1882		Presbyterian	Not on PCW website; presumably defunct
Capel Gorphwysfa, Llanberis	Llanberis			1867		Presbyterian	Not on PCW website; presumably defunct
Capel Rhydfawr, Llanddeiniolen	Llanddeiniolen			1816		Presbyterian	Not on PCW website; presumably defunct
Capel Disgwylfa, Deiniolen	Llanddeiniolen (Deiniolen)			1864		Presbyterian	Not on PCW website; presumably defunct
St Mary, Dinorwig	Llanddeiniolen (Dinorwig)	Mary			1997	Church in Wales	Now a workshop
Capel Dinorwig	Llanddeiniolen (Dinorwig)			1833		Presbyterian	Rebuilt 1844. Not on PCW website; presumably defunct
Capel Glasgoed	Llanddeiniolen (Glasgoed)			1861		Presbyterian	Not on PCW website; presumably defunct
Capel Jehofah-Jire, Penisa'r Waun	Llanddeiniolen (Penisa'r Waun)	Jehovah-jireh		1808		Methodist	Building 1828. Not on MC website; presumably defunct
Capel Rhiwlas, Rhiwlas	Llanddeiniolen (Rhiwlas)			1854		Presbyterian	Not on PCW website; presumably defunct
Capel Seion, Seion	Llanddeiniolen (Seion)	Zion		1818		Methodist	Not on MC website; presumably defunct
Capel Pont Ciltalgarth	Llandderfel (Ciltalgarth)					?	
St Mark, Frongoch	Llandderfel (Frongoch)	Mark		1858		Church in Wales	Demolished
St James, Glan-yr-afon	Llandderfel (Glan-yr-afon)	James		1861-1864		Church in Wales	Grade II listed. Not on CiW website; presumably defunct
SS Mor & Deiniol, Llanfor	Llandderfel (Llanfor)	Mor & Deiniol		Medieval	1992	Church in Wales	
Capel Gwige Llanfor, Llanfor	Llandderfel (Llanfor)			1862		Presbyterian	Not on PCW website; presumably defunct
Capel Ceserea, Fron	Llandwrog (Fron)	Caesarea		1840		Presbyterian	Rebuilt 1864, 1880. Not on PCW website; presumably defunct
St Thomas, Groeslon	Llandwrog (Groeslon)	Thomas		1846-1853		Church in Wales	Demolished
Capel Ramoth, Groeslon	Llandwrog (Groeslon)	Ramoth-Gilead		1872		Baptist	Not on BUW website; presumably defunct
Capel Caersalem, Bethesda	Llandygai	Jerusalem		1834		Baptist	Not on BUW website; presumably defunct
Capel Penygroes, Tregarth	Llandygai (Tregarth)			1837		Presbyterian	Not on PCW website; presumably defunct
St Bartholomew, Bontddu	Llanelltyd (Bontddu)	Bartholomew		c. 1895	c. 1975	Church in Wales	Demolished
Capel Soar, Taicynhaeaf	Llanelltyd (Taicynhaeaf)	Zoara		1846		Presbyterian	Rebuilt 1905. Not on PCW website; presumably defunct
St Garmon, Abersoch	Llanengan (Abersoch)	Germanus of Auxerre		1950s	2016	Roman Catholic	
Capel Bethlehem, Cilan	Llanengan (Cilan)	Bethlehem		1822		Presbyterian	Rebuilt 1835, 1855, 1875. Not on PCW website; presumably defunct
Capel Bethel, Llanfair	Llanfair	Bethel		1867		Presbyterian	Not on PCW website; presumably defunct
Capel Abertrinant	Llanfih.-y-Pennant (Abertrinant)			1832		Presbyterian	Rebuilt 1876. Not on PCW website; presumably defunct
Capel Ystradgwyn, Tal-y-llyn	Llanfih.-y-Pennant (Minffordd)			1828		Presbyterian	Rebuilt 1896. Not on PCW website; presumably defunct
St Mary, Tal-y-llyn	Llanfih.-y-Pennant (Tal-y-llyn)	Mary		Medieval		Church in Wales	Grade II* listed. Now redundant
St Brothen, Llanfrothen	Llanfrothen	Brothen		Medieval	pre-2002	Church in Wales	Grade I listed. Friends of Friendless Churches 2002
Capel Croesor	Llanfrothen (Croesor)			1863		Presbyterian	Not on PCW website; presumably defunct
St Catherine, Garreg	Llanfrothen (Garreg)	Catherine of Alexandria		C19th		Church in Wales	Not on CiW website; presumably defunct
St Celynnin, Llangelynnin	Llangelynnin	Celynin		Medieval		Church in Wales	Grade I listed. Disused 1867-1917, now disused again
St Mary, Rhoslefain	Llangelynnin (Rhoslefain)	Mary		1870		Church in Wales	Not on CiW website; presumably defunct
St Cywair, Llangywer	Llangywer	Cywair		Medieval	c. 2000	Church in Wales	Rebuilt 1780, 1871
Holy Trinity, Rhosygwaliau	Llangywer (Rhos-y-gwaliau)	Trinity		1879-1880		Church in Wales	Not on CiW website; presumably defunct
St Llechid, Llanllechid	Llanllechid	Llechid		Medieval		Church in Wales	Rebuilt 1844. Not on CiW website; presumably defunct
St Cynfil, Penrhos	Llannor (Penrhos)	Cynfil		pre-1842		Church in Wales	Current building 1842
St Deiniol, Llanuwchllyn	Llanuwchllyn	Deiniol		Medieval	2004	Church in Wales	
St Beuno, Llanycil	Llanycil	Beuno		Medieval	c. 2000	Church in Wales	
Capel Bethania, Aberangell	Mawddwy (Aberangell)	Bethany		1902		Presbyterian	In use as of 2000s but not on PCW site so defunct?
Capel Bethlehem, Cwm Cywarch	Mawddwy (Cwm Cywarch)	Bethlehem		1836		Independent	Rebuilt 1876. Now disused
St Tydecho, Llanymawddwy	Mawddwy (Llanymawddwy)	Tydecho		Medieval		Church in Wales	Not on CiW website; presumably defunct
St Mary, Nefyn	Nefyn	Mary		Medieval		Church in Wales	Rebuilt 1825-1827. Now a maritime museum
Resurrection of our Saviour, Morfa Nefyn	Nefyn (Morfa Nefyn)	Resurrection of Jesus		1968	2016	Roman Catholic	Congregation probably older
Capel Tabernacl, Morfa Nefyn	Nefyn (Morfa Nefyn)	Tabernacle		1862		Independent	Converted to a holiday cottage
St Elizabeth, Glasinfryn	Pentir (Glasinfryn)	Elizabeth		1871		Church in Wales	Now a house
St Cuwch, Carnguwch	Pistyll (Carnguwch)	Cuwch		Medieval		Church in Wales	Rebuilt 1882. Not on CiW website; presumably defunct
St Mary, Tremadog	Porthmadog (Tremadog)	Mary		1811	1995	Church in Wales	Now offices
Capel Salem, Pwllheli	Pwllheli	Jerusalem		1862		Presbyterian	Rebuilt 1893. Grade II listed. Not on PCW website; presumably defunct
Christ Church, Talsarnau	Talsarnau	Jesus		1871	2014	Church in Wales	Closed in 2014
Capel Beerseba, Tudweiliog	Tudweiliog	Beersheba		1825-1828		Independent	Now a house
St Mary, Penllech	Tudweiliog (Penllech)	Mary		Medieval		Church in Wales	Friends of Friendless Churches 2009
Capel Bethesda, Tywyn	Tywyn	Pool of Bethesda		1820	c. 2010	Independent	Rebuilt 1892. In residential use 2016
St John the Evangelist, Waunfawr	Waunfawr	John the Evangelist		1880		Church in Wales	
