= List of places in Gwynedd =

Map of places in Gwynedd compiled from this list
See the list of places in Wales for places in other principal areas.

This is a list of cities, towns and villages in the principal area of Gwynedd, Wales.

== A ==
Aberangell, Aberdaron, Aberdesach, Aberdyfi, Abererch, Abergwyngregyn, Abergynolwyn, Aberllefenni, Abersoch, Afon Wen, Arthog

== B ==
Bala, Bangor, Barmouth, Beddgelert, Bethania, Bethel, Bethesda, Betws Garmon, Blaenau Ffestiniog, Boduan, Bontddu, Bontnewydd, Botwnnog, Brithdir, Bryncroes, Bryn-crug, Bwlch-derwin, Bwlchtocyn

== C ==
Caeathro, Caerhun, Caernarfon, Capel Curig, Carmel, Chwilog, Clynnog Fawr, Clwt-y-bont, Corris Uchaf, Corris, Criccieth, Croesor, Cwm-y-glo

== D ==
Deiniolen, Dinas Dinlle, Dinas Mawddwy, Dinas, Dinorwig, Dolgellau, Dolmelinllyn

== E ==
Edern, Efailnewydd, Esgairgeiliog

== F ==
Fairbourne, Friog

== G ==
Ganllwyd, Garndolbenmaen, Gellilydan, Glasinfryn, Golan, Groeslon

== H ==
Harlech

== L ==
Llanaber, Llanaelhaearn, Llanbedr, Llanbedrog, Llanberis, Llandanwg, Llanegryn, Llandegwning, Llanddeiniolen, Llandwrog, Llanelltyd, Llanengan, Llanfair Llanfihangel-y-pennant, Abergynolwyn, Llanfihangel-y-pennant, Cwm Pennant, Llanfrothen, Llangwnnadl, Llangybi, Llaniestyn, Llan Ffestiniog, Llangian, Llanllechid, Llanymawddwy, Llannor, Llanrug, Llanwnda, Llanystumdwy, Llithfaen, Llwyndyrys, Llwyngwril

== M ==
Mallwyd, Maentwrog, Minffordd, Morfa Nefyn, Mynydd Llandegai, Mynytho

== N ==
Nantlle, Nantmor, Nasareth, Nebo, Nefyn

== P ==
Pant Glas, Penffridd, Penisa'r Waun, Penmaenpool, Pennal, Penrhos, Penrhosgarnedd, Penrhyndeudraeth, Pentre Gwynfryn, Penygroes, Pen-y-meinl, Pistyll, Pontllyfni, Pontrug, Porth Dinllaen, Porthmadog, Portmeirion, Prenteg, Pwllheli

== R ==
Rachub, Rhiw, Rhiwddolion, Rhiwlas (in Llanddeiniolen community), Rhiwlas (in Llandderfel community), Rhosgadfan, Rhostryfan, Rhoshirwaun, Rhoslefair, Rhyd Ddu, Rhyd-y-clafdy, Rhos-y-gwaliau

== S ==
Sarn Meyllteyrn

== T ==
Tal-y-bont (near Bangor), Tal-y-bont (near Barmouth), Talysarn, Trawsfynydd, Trefor, Tregarth, Tremadog, Tudweiliog, Tywyn, Talsarnau

== U ==
Uwchmynydd

== W ==
Waunfawr

== Y ==
Y Felinheli, Y Ffor

== See also ==
- List of places in Gwynedd (categorised)
