= William Rowlands (Gwilym Lleyn) =

Welsh Methodist minister and bibliographer (1802–1865)

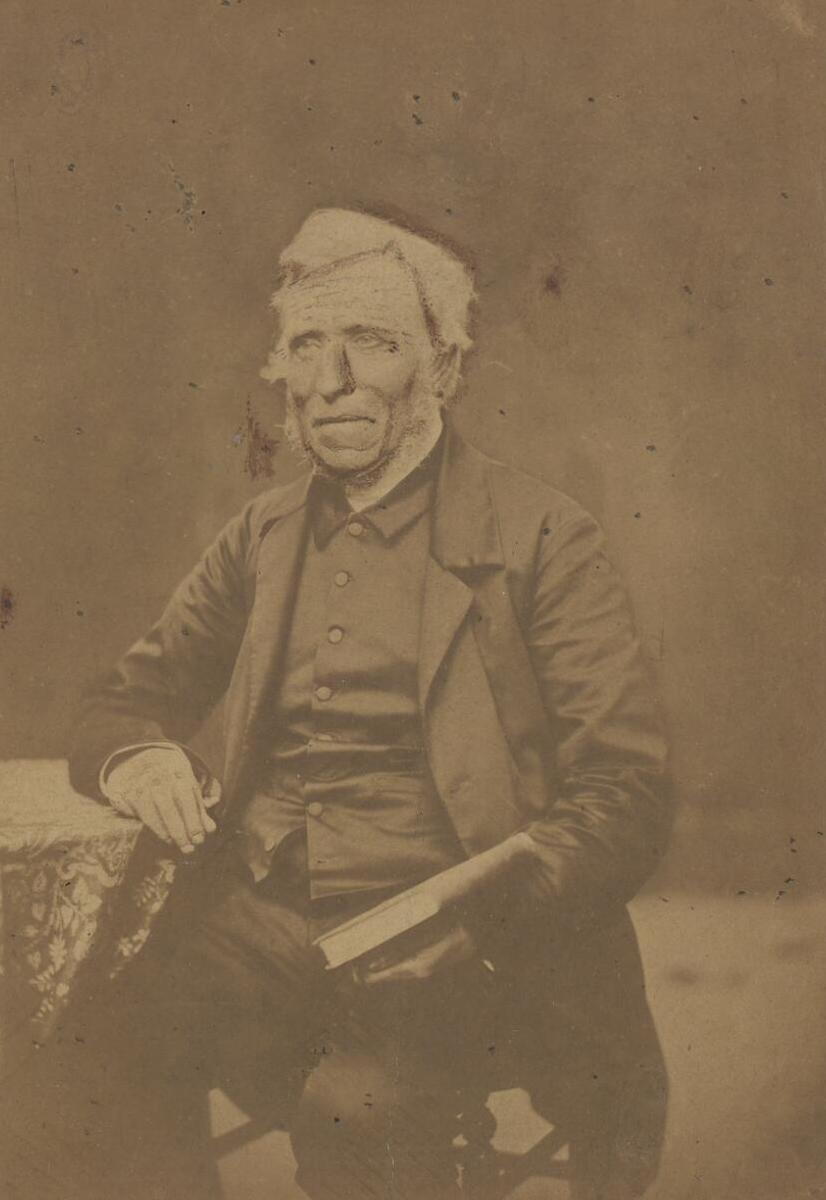
Photograph William Rowlands 'Gwilym Lleyn' c.1860

William Rowlands (1802–1865), known as Gwylym Lleyn, was a Welsh bibliographer and Methodist minister.

== Life ==
The son of Thomas and Eleanor Rowlands, he was born at Bryn Croes, Carnarvonshire, on 24 August 1802. After a little schooling at Bryn Croes and Botwnnog, he took up his father's craft of weaving, living in various places in Carnarvonshire.

Rowlands had been brought up a Calvinistic Methodist, but at the age of 18 he adopted Arminian views, and joined the Wesleyans. In March 1821 he began to preach at Bryn Caled; shortly afterwards he and his parents settled at Ty Coch, near Bangor. After some years' experience as a lay preacher, he acted for a short time as substitute in the Cardigan circuit for John Davies, chairman of the Welsh district, in July 1828. He was retained in the circuit on Davies's return, and in August 1829 he was admitted as a probationer to the Wesleyan methodist ministry and appointed to the Cardiff circuit. He then served in succession the following chapels: Merthyr (1831), Amlwch (1834), Pwllheli (1835), Newmarket (1837), Ruthin (1840), Llanidloes (1842), Tredegar (1845), Machynlleth (1848), Bryn Mawr (1850), Llanidloes (1853), Tredegar (1856), Aberystwyth (1858), and Machynlleth (1861).

In 1864 Rowlands retired from circuit work and settled as a supernumerary at Oswestry, where he died on 21 March 1865. He was buried at Caerau, near Llanidloes. At an Eisteddfod at Eglwysfaer in 1865, a prize for the best elegy on Rowlands was won by E. Edwards of Aberystwyth, and the elegy was published in 1866.

== Works ==
The major work of Rowlands is bibliographical and biographical: Llyfryddiaeth y Cymry (Cambrian Bibliography), a record of Welsh books, books printed in Wales, and books having reference to the country, from 1546 to 1800. It was begun about 1828, and Rowlands researched it while travelling. Part of his list of books was printed in Y Traethodydd; but it was not until 1869 that the book appeared at Llanidloes, edited and enlarged by Daniel Silvan Evans.

Rowlands also published religious works, including an essay on Providence (1836), a translation of Wesley's tract on Romanism (1838), and memoirs of the Rev. J. Milward (1839) and the Rev. J. Davies (1847). He was editor of the Eurgrawn Wesleyaidd from 1842 to 1845, and from 1852 to 1856. Gwilym Lleyn (his literary title) compiled biographies of Welsh worthies, which on his death were acquired by the publisher of Enwogion Cymru (1870), and included under the title "Lleyn MSS".

== Notes ==
Attribution This article incorporates text from a publication now in the public domain: Lee, Sidney, ed. (1897). "Rowlands, William". Dictionary of National Biography. Vol. 49. London: Smith, Elder & Co.
