= Llangybi =

Llangybi can refer to one of several villages named after Saint Cybi, their reputed founder.

In Wales

- Llangybi, Ceredigion
- Llangybi, Gwynedd
- Llangybi, Monmouthshire
