= Nesta Wyn Jones =

Welsh poet and writer

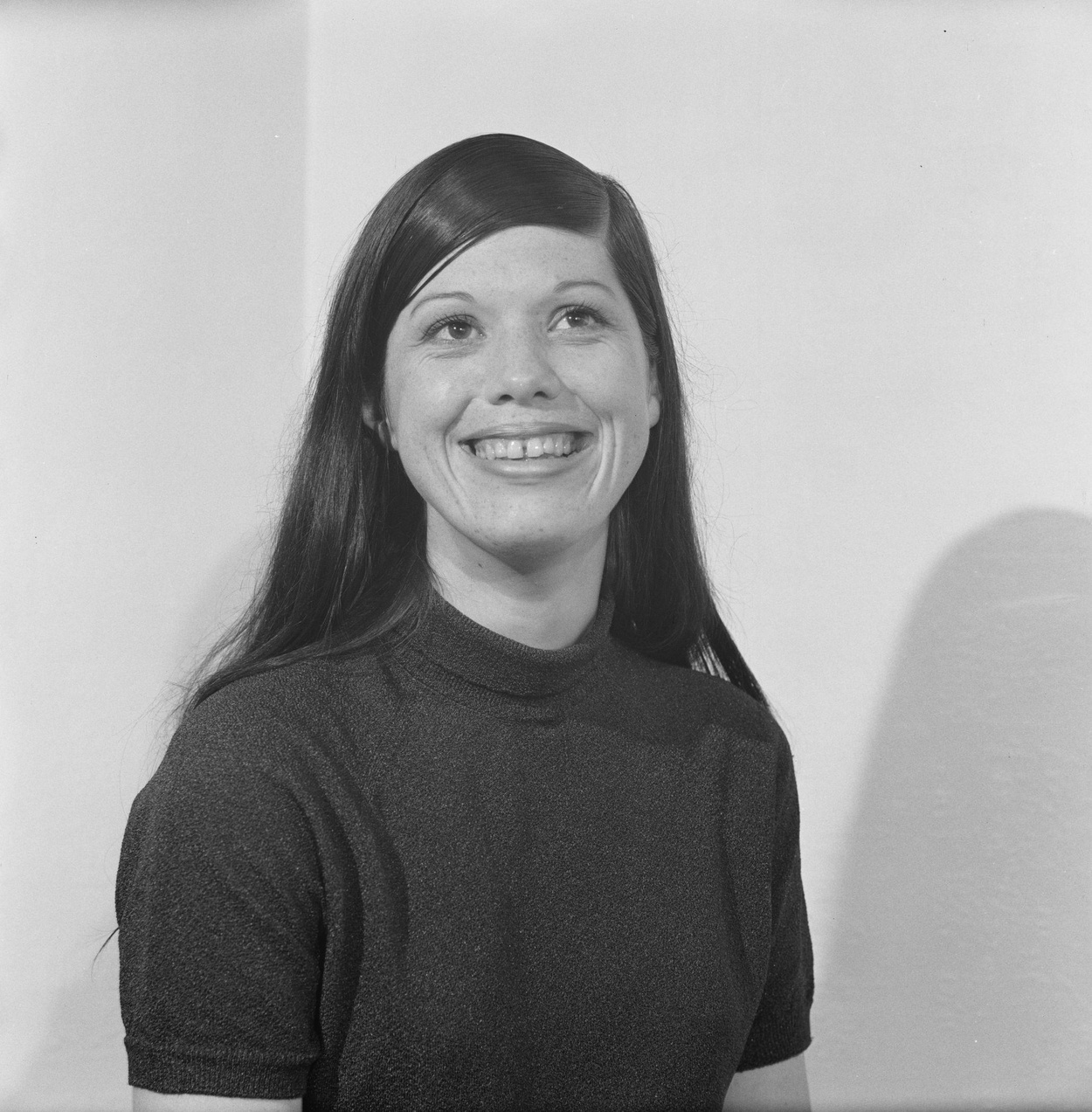
- Born: June 22, 1946; Abergeirw, Gwynedd
- Died: April 5, 2025 (aged 78); Dolgellau
- Citizenship: Wales
- Education: Bangor University
- Occupations: Poet, writer

Nesta Wyn Jones (22 June 1946 – 5 April 2025) was a poet and writer from Wales. She won the Arts Council award in 1987 for her poetry collection Rhwng Chwerthin a Chrio.

== Early life and education ==
Nesta Wyn Jones was raised in Abergeirw, Gwynedd. She attended Rhydygorlan Primary School, Abergeirw, and then Dr Williams' School, Dolgellau, before going on to complete a degree in Welsh at Bangor University.

== Career ==
Nesta Wyn Jones worked at Bangor University on the "Gorwelion" series of project books for secondary schools teaching Welsh as a first language, and then with the Welsh Books Council in Aberystwyth.

Her first book, Cannwyll yn Olau, won first prize in the Arts Council's Young Poets Competition. She went on to win a travel scholarship from the Arts Council in both 1976 and 1991, as well as an Arts Council award in 1987 for Rhwng Chwerthin a Chrio. She has been a member of the Welsh Academy since 1970.

== Personal life ==
Nesta Wyn Jones lived on a farm in Abergeirw, in the Dolgellau area. She married her late husband, Gwilym, in 1982 and her daughter, Annest Gwilym, was born in 1983. Nesta Wyn Jones died on 5 April 2025 at the age of 78. In a tribute to her, Gwerfyl Pierce Jones, former Chief Executive of the Welsh Books Council, said she was "an exceptional poet, writer and critic."

== Bibliography ==
- Cannwyll yn Olau (Gomer, 1969)
- Ffenest Ddu (Gomer, 1973)
- Dyddiadur Israel (Gomer, 1981)
- Rhwng Chwerthin a Chrio (Gomer, 1986)
- Cyfri Pryfed (Gomer, 1990)
- Dawns y Sêr (Gomer, 1999)
