= Willie Hopkins =

Wales international rugby union player

- Full name: William John Hopkins
- Born: 18 June 1896 Margam, Wales
- Died: 7 July 1968 (aged 72) Morfa Nefyn, Wales

Rugby union career
- Position: Fly-half
International career
Years	Team	Apps	(Points)
1925	Wales	2	(3)

William John Hopkins (18 June 1896 – 7 July 1968) was a Welsh international rugby union player.

Born and raised in Port Talbot, Hopkins was educated at The Mountain School, where in addition to rugby he had success as a swimmer. He was a Welsh Schoolboys rugby representative.

Hopkins played junior rugby for Aberavon Rovers and in 1923 toured France with his county team.

A half–back, Hopkins was capped twice for Wales, debuting against England at Twickenham at 1925.

Hopkins took over as captain of Aberavon RFC in 1925–26.

== See also ==
- List of Wales national rugby union players
