= Dic Goodman =

Welsh poet (1920–2013)

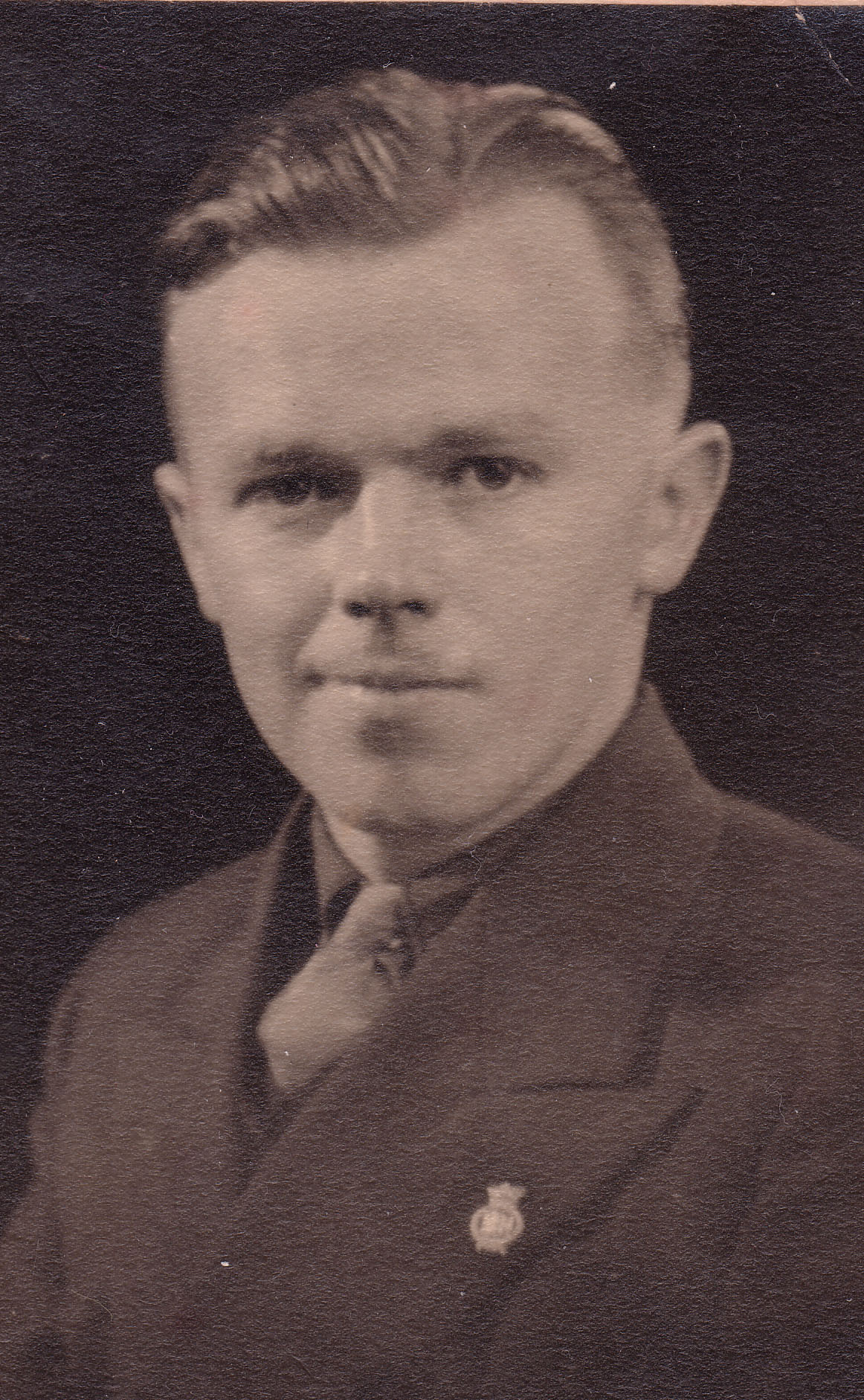
In his Navy days

Richard Goodman Jones (20 January 1920 – 4 March 2013) was a Welsh poet, better known as Dic. He was a resident of Mynytho on the Llŷn Peninsula, Gwynedd.

== Background ==
Richard was born to his mother Kate, and his father of his same name who died within 1 month of Richard's birth. Though Kate remarried within 9 years, Richard remained an only child, and eventually lost his stepfather in a farming accident. Richard was brought up in humble circumstances in the North Welsh village Mynytho, where he attended Foel Gron primary school. He never disassociated himself with the area.

In 1952 he married Laura Ellen Jones (also of Mynytho) and fathered two children; Sian and Dafydd. He died on 4 March 2013, at the age of 93. He was survived by his wife, two children and two grandchildren by his son Dafydd.

== His work ==
Richard explored numerous professions, from being a painter and decorator, an insurance salesman, and a World War II merchant seaman to being a teacher at Pont-y-Gof primary school, in Botwnnog. As a poet, he has won many bardic chairs, but never the National Eisteddfod. Many collections of his work have been published, including Hanes Y Daith and a book about space. He was a renowned writer of the englyn form.

== Bibliography ==
- Caneuon y Gwynt a'r Glaw (1975)
- I'r Rhai sy'n gweld Rhosyn Gwyllt (1979)
