= St Beuno's Church, Clynnog Fawr =

St Beuno's Church
- Eglwys Beuno Sant
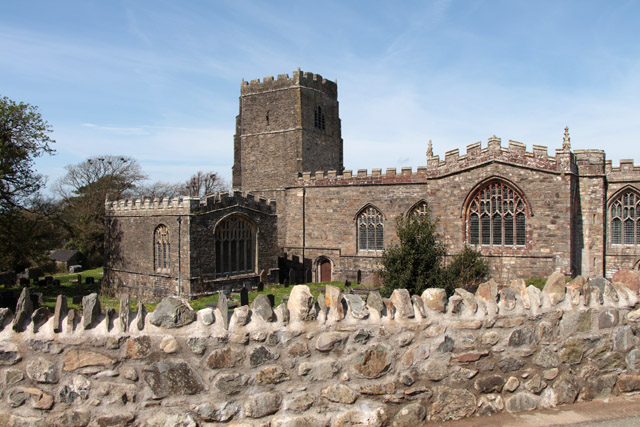
- The chapel (left) and church (right) from the south-east

- Location in Gwynedd
- 53.021015°N 4.365198°W
- Location: Clynnog Fawr, Gwynedd
- Country: Wales
- Denomination: Anglican (Church in Wales)
- Previous denomination: Roman Catholic

History
- Status: Parish church
- Founder: Beuno
- Dedication: Beuno

Architecture
- Functional status: Active
- Heritage designation: Grade I

Administration
- Diocese: Bangor
- Archdeaconry: Bangor
- Benefice: Beuno Sant, Uwch Gwyrfai
- Parish: Beuno Sant, Uwch Gwyrfai

St Beuno's Church is a place of worship located in the village of Clynnog Fawr, Gwynedd, Wales. It belongs to the Church in Wales, an Anglican denomination, and is one of six churches in the parish of Beuno Sant Uwch Gwyrfai. It is adjacent to St Beuno's Chapel, to which it is connected, and approximately 322 metres (352 yards) north-east of Ffynnon Beuno (Beuno's Well). Beuno was a seventh-century Welsh abbot who founded a clas on the site of the present church and was later buried there.

The church is significant for its architecture and fittings, and has been described by the Royal Commission on the Ancient and Historical Monuments of Wales as "one of the most notable [churches] in North Wales". It is a Grade I listed building.

== Administration ==
The church is one of six in the parish and benefice of Beuno Sant Uwch Gwyrfai, the other five being Christ Church, Penygroes; St Gwyndaf, Llanwnda; St Aelhaern, Llanaelhaearn; and St Twrog, Llandwrog. The parish is within the synod of Bangor, the archdeaconry of Bangor, and the diocese of Bangor.

== History ==
The earliest parts of the current church are the chancel and transepts, which date from c. 1480 and must have been completed by 1486, the date which appears on stained glass formerly in the east window. The nave was built soon afterwards, in c. 1500, but the fact it is an addition is clear from the fact that the external plinth and string course of the transepts are visible on its interior east wall. The north porch was probably built shortly after the nave, and the vestry, west tower, and St Beuno's chapel probably date from the early sixteenth century. The tower and chapel are similar in style and have uncusped window tracery similar to that of the tower of Bangor Cathedral, which was completed in 1532. The passage between the tower and chapel probably dates from the early seventeenth century.The church is recorded as having been burnt in 978 by the Vikings and later burnt again by the Normans The church is a Grade I listed building.

== Ffynnon Beuno ==
The well is located on the outskirts of the village, south-west of the church. It consists of a rectangular pool enclosed by a roughly dressed stone wall.

== See also ==
- List of churches in Gwynedd
- List of Church in Wales churches
