= Eurgrawn Wesleyaidd =

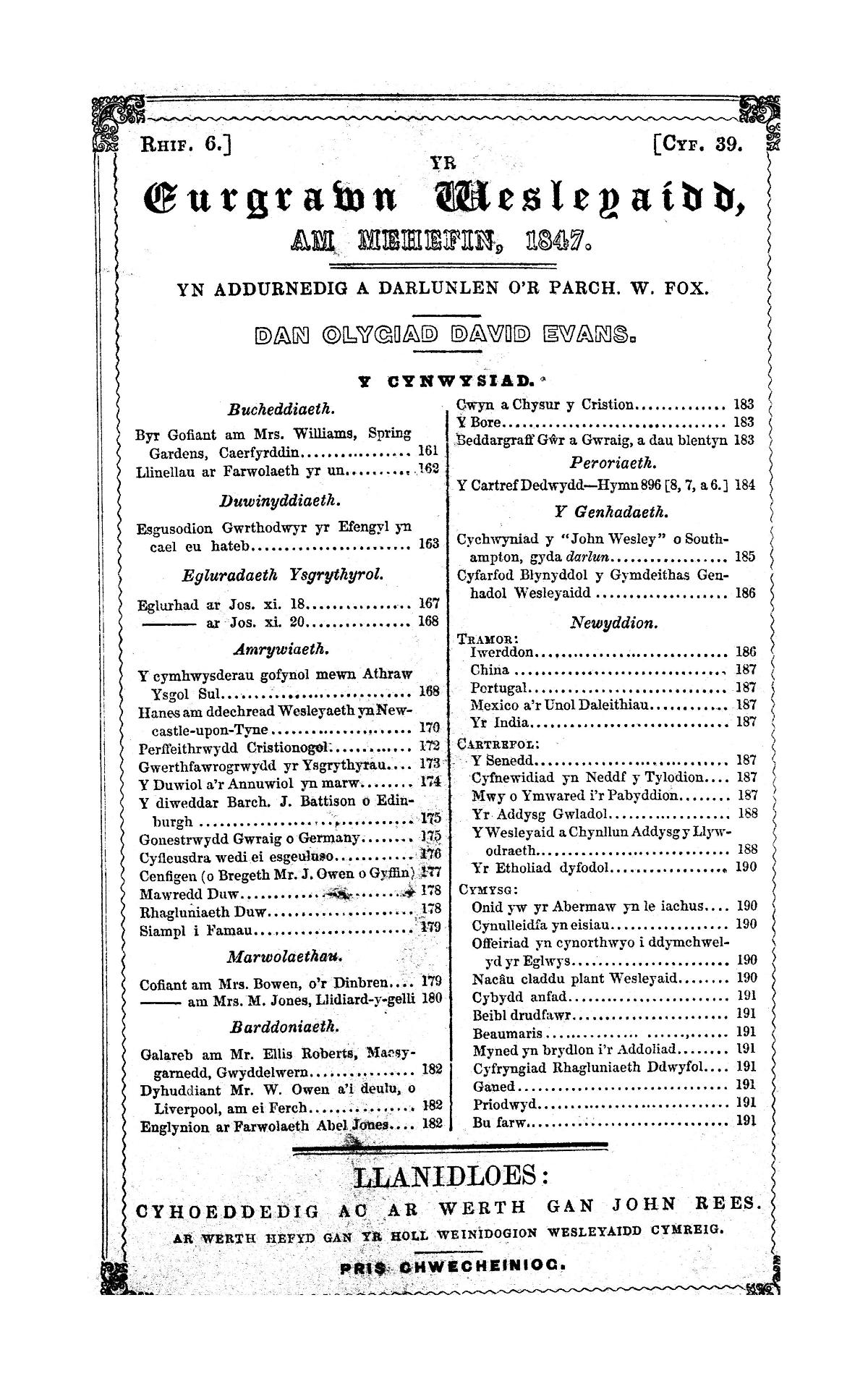
Eurgrawn Wesleyaidd (Welsh Journal)

Eurgrawn Wesleyaidd was a Welsh language periodical first published in Dolgellau by Richard Jones in 1809. Its contents, which included articles on religious subjects, literature, and philosophy and also poetry and biographies, were aimed at members of the Wesleyan Methodist Church. Its editors included Methodist ministers John Bryan (1776–1856) and Thomas Hughes (1854–1928). A product of the religious revival in Wales, where John and Charles Wesley and their followers preached widely, this magazine proved popular and was published in some form from 1809 until 1983.
