= Tudweiliog =

Village in Gwynedd, Wales

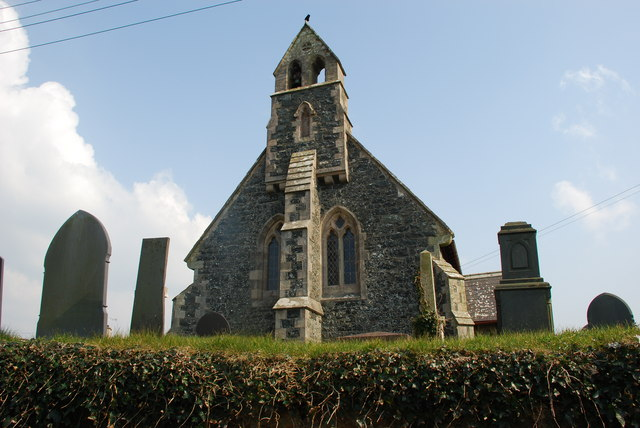
- St Cwyfan's Church

- Location within Gwynedd
- Area: 35.53 km^{2} (13.72 sq mi)
- Population: 970 (2011)
  - Density: 27/km^{2} (70/sq mi)
- OS grid reference: SH237367
- Community: Tudweiliog
- Principal area: Gwynedd
- Preserved county: Gwynedd
- Country: Wales
- Sovereign state: United Kingdom
- Post town: PWLLHELI
- Postcode district: LL53
- Dialling code: 01758
- Police: North Wales
- Fire: North Wales
- Ambulance: Welsh
- UK Parliament: Dwyfor Meirionnydd
- Senedd Cymru – Welsh Parliament: Dwyfor Meirionnydd
- List of places UK Wales Gwynedd 52.899°N 4.621°W Map of the community

Tudweiliog is a small, predominantly Welsh-speaking village and community on the northern coast of the Llŷn Peninsula in the Welsh county of Gwynedd. It is in the historic county of Caernarfonshire. The population has risen from 801 in 2001 to 970 in 2011. The community includes the small settlement of Llangwnnadl. The community covers just over 35 square kilometres (14 sq mi).

Agriculture is the main industry in Tudweiliog, with numerous farms both pastoral and arable.

== Etymology ==
The village name was often spelt "Tydweiliog" until the 1980s, representing a local pronunciation /tədˈwei̯ljɔɡ/ with an obscure vowel in the first syllable. However, since the publication in 1957 by the University of Wales, Aberystwyth, of a list of recommended official spellings of Welsh place names, where names are spelt in standard Welsh as a general rule, the form Tudweiliog is now in use on signage, pronounced as /tɨ̞dˈwei̯ljɔɡ/ (the "u" is pronounced as a kind of "i"). Colloquially, the origin of the name is as follows:

- One tells of a man called Wil living in a house and known to be lazy; in Welsh, "house" would be Tŷ, his name Wil and finally, "lazy" would be diog, which would combine to make Tywilddiog.
- Another tells of a priest riding his horse (Gweiliog) over the sea from Ireland to Porth Towyn beach, and upon arrival the horse left a hoofprint on a stone (there is a rock on the beach which does show what appears to be a hoofprint; this may be a natural formation or deliberately carved to solidify the tale). After that the priest calls out to the horse: "Tyrd Weiliog" ("Come Weiliog" – tyrd is commonly reduced to tyd /tɨ̞d/ colloquially, a name in the vocative case undergoes soft mutation: Gweiliog to Weiliog, hence "Tudweiliog").
- Another suggestion is that the name derives from Tudwal Loc ("Tudwal's Place" or "Tudwal's Priory", loc(us) being Latin for place, which in Old Welsh was the word borrowed for priory, modern Welsh llog, but in use today in this sense only in the compound name mynachlog, "monastery"). Loc as a place-name element is common in Brittany where St Tudwal emigrated from Wales to Armorica. The name suggests that St Tudwal had a priory here, the only evidence being a farmhouse called Mynachdy (which is literally "monk-house", usually in the sense of monastic grange) in an area called Rhos y Llan ("heath of the churchtown"). St Tudwal is known to have built a priory on one of the St Tudwal Islands named after him, southeast of Tudweiliog on the Llŷn Peninsula, near Abersoch. St Tudwal was one of the seven founding saints of Brittany. Tudwal Loc, however, is an impossible derivation, as such a pattern (saint's name + llog) does not occur in the Brythonic languages. In fact, the placename is Tudwal + the territorial suffix -iog (in this case causing vowel affection in the previous syllable (a > ei), hence the transformation Tudwaliog into Tudweiliog), and in line with other such names (e.g. Ffestiniog, territory of Ffestin).

== Amenities and attractions ==
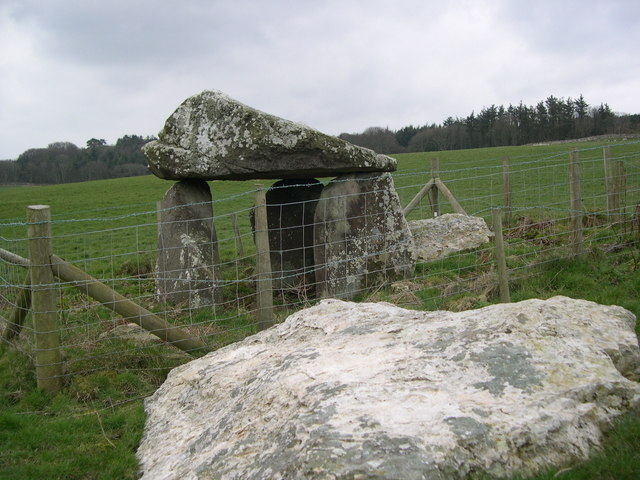
The burial chamber at Cefnamwlch (Coetan Arthur)

Tudweiliog is a small village with a population of around 1000 people. Tourism plays an important role in the village economy during the summer. The village is north of Penrhyn Llŷn overlooking the Irish Sea. Attractions include Coetan Arthur, a (burial chamber) on Mynydd Cefnamwlch; Bronze Age remains at the summit of Carn Fadryn; the sandy beaches of Tywyn and Penllech; and the historically important ports of Porth Ysgaden and Porth Colmon at Llangwnnadl, and Porth Gwylan, which is managed by the National Trust.

The village has a post office (which also functions as a village store), village hall, public house (the Lion Hotel, the largest building in the village), smithy, a primary school (Ysgol Tudweiliog, which celebrated its centenary in 2007), parish church, Nonconformist chapel and by the entrance of Towyn Farm beach is Cwt Tatws ("potato hut") which stocks Welsh bric-à-bracs/souvenirs, home decor and clothing and also includes a café.

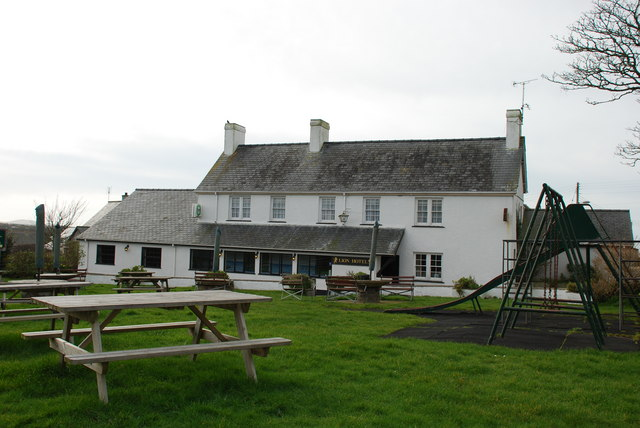
Gwesty'r Llew Lion Hotel

There are numerous campsites in and around Tudweiliog and a caravan site. There are also a handful of cottages for rent and B&Bs available to stay at. The local public house also provides a bed-and-breakfast service.

=== Cefnamwlch ===
The Cefnamwlch estate lies to the south of the village. The house is listed at Grade II*, and its gardens and grounds are designated Grade II on the Cadw/ICOMOS Register of Parks and Gardens of Special Historic Interest in Wales.

== Transport ==
A local bus service (provided by Nefyn Coaches) provides a connection every one and two hours (7 am, 8 am and 9 am for 1 hour buses, and every 2 hours from 9 am onwards) between Tudweiliog and Pwllheli, the nearest market town, approximately 10 miles (16 km) away. The bus stops at other villages on the way, including Nefyn, Dinas, Trefor and Pencaenewydd, depending on which bus is taken.

The B4417 goes through the village; the road and joining side-roads give access to nearby villages such as Morfa Nefyn and Nefyn, only a 7- and 10-minutes drive away respectively. The B4413 also provides a connection to Botwnnog, which houses the nearest high school (Ysgol Botwnnog) amongst other amenities. The B4413 also links up to the A499 which provides the connection to Pwllheli, where the nearest railway station is situated, along with many other larger stores. Botwnnog is approximately 11 minutes away, whilst Pwllheli is 20 minutes away when taking the route via the A497.

== Notable residents ==
Country music duo John ac Alun were both brought up in the village and attended the local school.
