= Mynytho =

Coordinates: 52.851°N 4.514°W

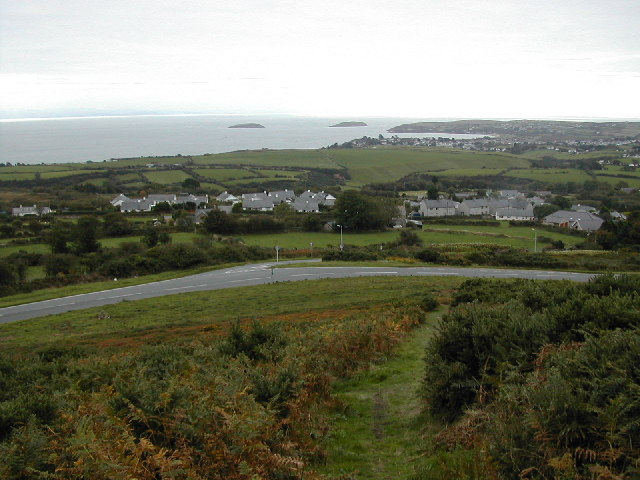
- Looking towards the south

- Location within Gwynedd
- Population: 536
- OS grid reference: SH307311
  - Cardiff: 110 mi (177 km)
- Community: Llanengan
- Principal area: Gwynedd
- Preserved county: Gwynedd
- Country: Wales
- Sovereign state: United Kingdom
- Post town: PWLLHELI
- Postcode district: LL53
- Dialling code: 01758
- Police: North Wales
- Fire: North Wales
- Ambulance: Welsh
- UK Parliament: Dwyfor Meirionnydd
- Senedd Cymru – Welsh Parliament: Dwyfor Meirionnydd

Mynytho is a small village in the parish of Llanengan near the southern coast of the Llŷn Peninsula in northwestern Wales. It consists of a few houses and some farmland. There are also several campsites on the outskirts of the village. The population was 536 as of the 2011 UK census with over a third born in England.

Mynytho's hall occupies a significant place in the history of the struggle for the recognition of Welsh culture and the Welsh language.

The following englyn by the poet R. Williams Parry appears on a plaque mounted on the wall of the hall.

Adeiladwyd gan dlodi, — nid cerrig

Ond cariad yw'r meini;

Cydernes yw'r coed arni,
Cyd-ddyheu a'i cododd hi.

In English this means

It is built of poverty, not stones

But love is its masonry,

Shared aspirations are its timber,
And shared commitment is what raised it up.

Mynytho is also the site of a small yet highly visible tower that stands on a hill (Foel Tŵr) overlooking the area. The tower, which is popularly known to English residents as the "Jampot", is an old windmill but was never a success due to crosswinds on the hill, it is identified on maps as being an old mill. The land (Foel Tŵr) on which it stands is owned by the National Trust.

The community supports its own large chapel called Horeb, which stands close to the common land and a spring said to have healing properties. Of historical interest is the older (18th century) but disused chapel (Capel Newydd) which stands on the left hand side of the road to Nanhoron.

Neighbouring villages and settlements include Llanbedrog, Abersoch, Llangian, Nanhoron, Rhydyclafdy and Botwnnog.

== Notable people ==
- John Jones (1836–1921), known as Myrddin Fardd, a Welsh writer, antiquarian, scholar and a collector of folklore.
- Dic Goodman (1920-2013), a Welsh poet and lifelong resident of the village.
- Eleri Llewelyn Morris, a Welsh author, born and lives in the village
