= Brithdir and Llanfachreth =

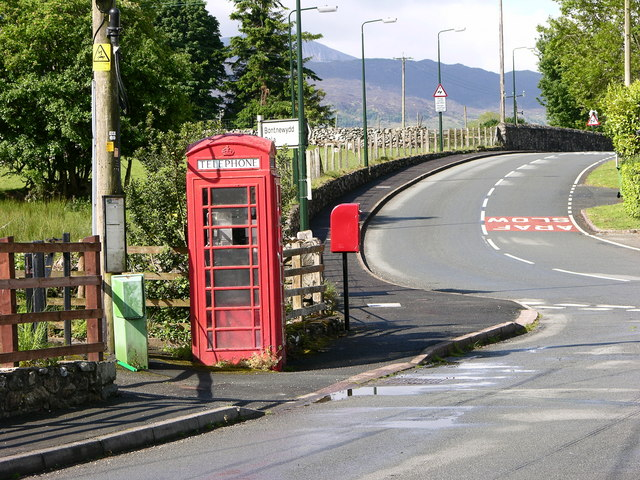

- Location within Gwynedd
- Population: 751
- OS grid reference: SH 790 210
  - Cardiff: 93.1 mi (149.8 km)
  - London: 178.4 mi (287.1 km)
- Community: Brithdir and Llanfachreth
- Principal area: Gwynedd
- Country: Wales
- Sovereign state: United Kingdom
- Post town: Dolgellau
- Police: North Wales
- Fire: North Wales
- Ambulance: Welsh
- List of places UK Wales Gwynedd 52.773068°N 3.795536°W Map of the community

Brithdir and Llanfachreth is a community in the county of Gwynedd, Wales, near Dolgellau, and is 93.1 miles (149.8 km) from Cardiff and 178.4 miles (287.1 km) from London. In 2011 the population of Brithdir and Llanfachreth was 751 with 67.3% of them able to speak Welsh.

At the local level, the community elects ten community councillors to Llanfachreth, Brithdir and Rhydymain Community Council. The community also includes the hamlet of Abergeirw.

== See also ==
- List of localities in Wales by population
