= Bryncroes =

Hamlet in Gwynedd, Wales

Coordinates: 52.851°N 4.634°W

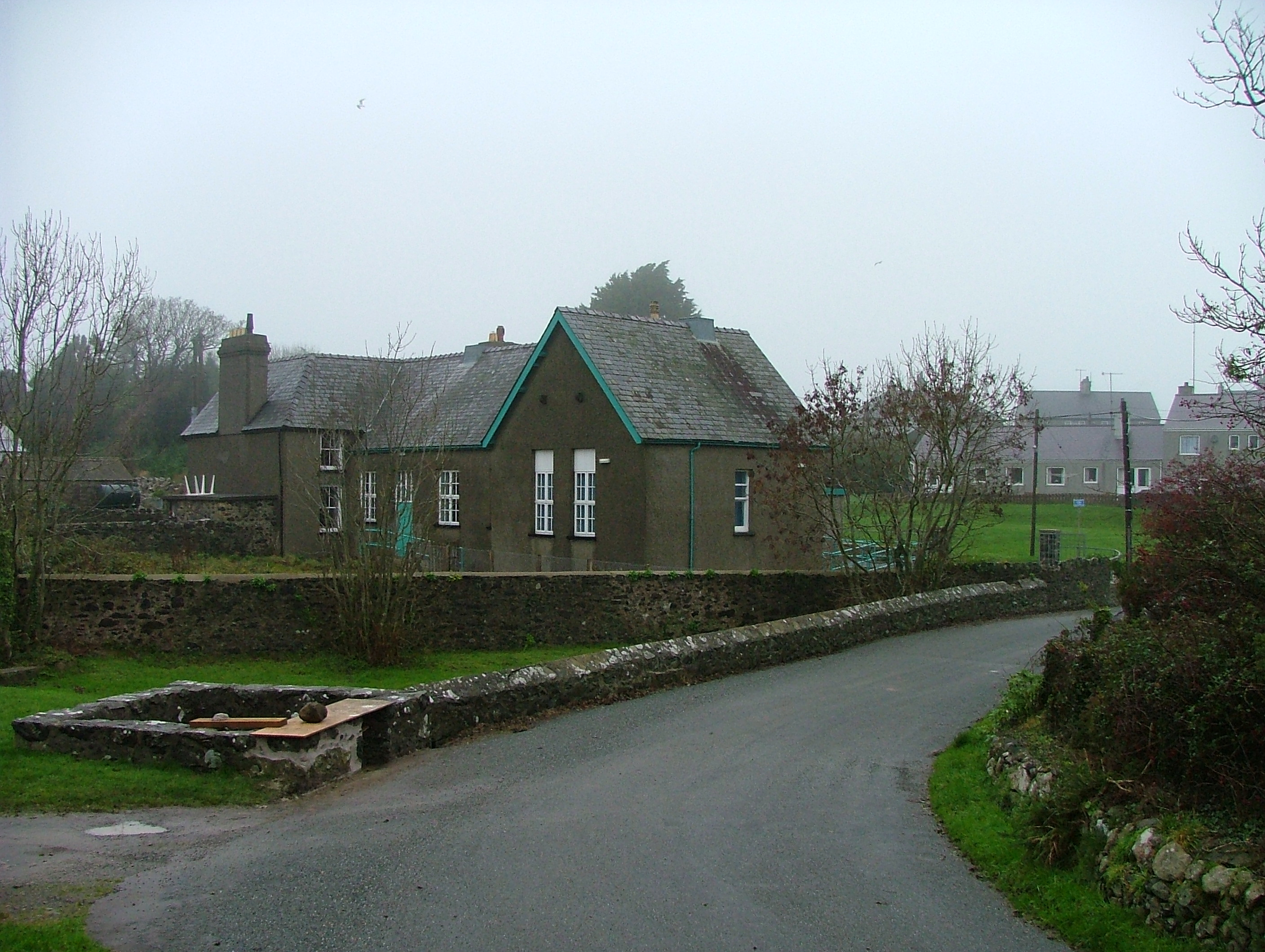
- Ysgol Bryncroes

- Location within Gwynedd
- OS grid reference: SH226314
- Community: Botwnnog
- Principal area: Gwynedd
- Preserved county: Gwynedd
- Country: Wales
- Sovereign state: United Kingdom
- Post town: PWLLHELI
- Postcode district: LL53
- Dialling code: 01758
- Police: North Wales
- Fire: North Wales
- Ambulance: Welsh
- UK Parliament: Dwyfor Meirionnydd
- Senedd Cymru – Welsh Parliament: Gwynedd Maldwyn

Bryncroes is a hamlet and former civil parish in Gwynedd in Wales, and lies on the Llŷn Peninsula approximately 2 km west of Sarn Meyllteyrn. The parish was abolished in 1934 and divided between Botwnnog and Aberdaron. The village was the scene of fierce protests between 1969 and 1972 when it was proposed to close the village school. However, the protests were in vain and the school closed, and is now a village community centre.

Near the school is a well, which was used as a stopping-off point of the pilgrims on their way to Bardsey Island (Welsh: Ynys Enlli).

William Rowlands (1802–1865), bardic name Gwylym Lleyn, was a Welsh bibliographer and Methodist minister. He was born at Bryn Croes.
