= Brithdir, Gwynedd =

Coordinates: 52.753°N 3.824°W

Brithdir
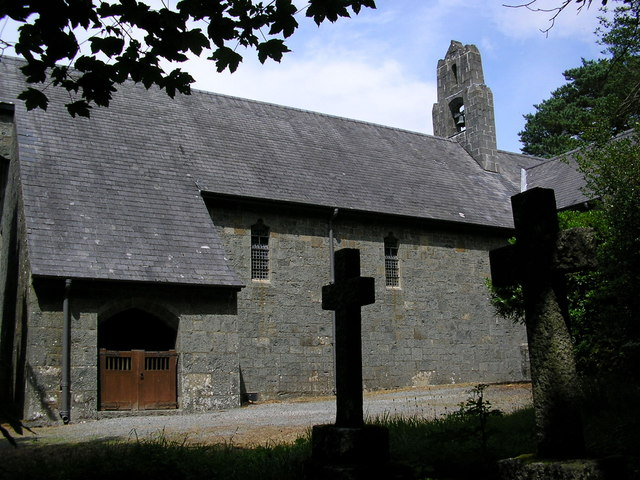
- St Mark's Church, Brithdir

- Location within Gwynedd
- OS grid reference: SH769188
- Community: Brithdir and Llanfachreth
- Principal area: Gwynedd
- Country: Wales
- Sovereign state: United Kingdom
- Post town: DOLGELLAU
- Postcode district: LL40
- Dialling code: 01341
- Police: North Wales
- Fire: North Wales
- Ambulance: Welsh
- UK Parliament: Dwyfor Meirionnydd
- Senedd Cymru – Welsh Parliament: Dwyfor Meirionnydd

Brithdir is a small hamlet on the outskirts of Dolgellau, Gwynedd in the community of Brithdir and Llanfachreth.

The Arts and Crafts Movement St Mark's Church is a Grade I listed building in the care of the Friends of Friendless Churches. Brithdir also includes a village hall, a phone box and a children's nursery.

== History ==
Human activity in Brithdir dates back to the 2nd century AD, where Romans established a military outpost in a field known as Cae'r Fynwent near the River Wnion. The 19th and 20th century saw increased mining activity, including copper and slate. The defining landmark in the village is St. Mark’s Church. It was commissioned by Louisa Tooth in memory of her late husband.
