= Penisa'r Waun =

Coordinates: 53.152°N 4.166°W

Penisa'r-waun
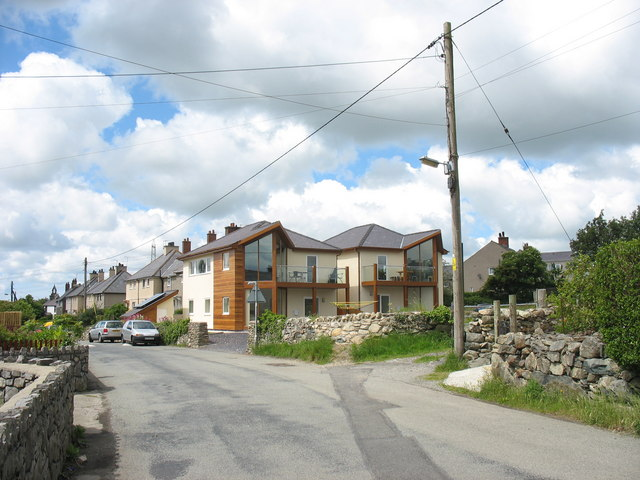
- Houses at Penisa'r-waun

- Location within Gwynedd
- OS grid reference: SH551638
- Community: Llanddeiniolen
- Principal area: Gwynedd
- Country: Wales
- Sovereign state: United Kingdom
- Post town: CAERNARFON
- Postcode district: LL55
- Dialling code: 01286
- Police: North Wales
- Fire: North Wales
- Ambulance: Welsh
- UK Parliament: Dwyfor Meirionnydd
- Senedd Cymru – Welsh Parliament: Arfon

Penisa'r-waun is a small village which is located 4 miles (6 km) to the east of Caernarfon and one mile (1.6 km) to the northeast of Llanrug on the A4244 in Gwynedd, north-west Wales.

== Education ==
The village includes a primary school, Ysgol Gymuned Penisarwaun, that instructs around 60 pupils aged between 3–11. The school is categorised as a Welsh-medium primary school and around 70% of the pupils come from Welsh-speaking homes.

== Governance ==
Penisa'r-waun is an electoral ward in the area. The majority of the population is shown as being in Llanddeiniolen community. The total population of the ward taken at the 2011 census was 1,768.
