= Llangian =

Coordinates: 52.830°N 4.531°W

Llangian: Welsh: Llangïan
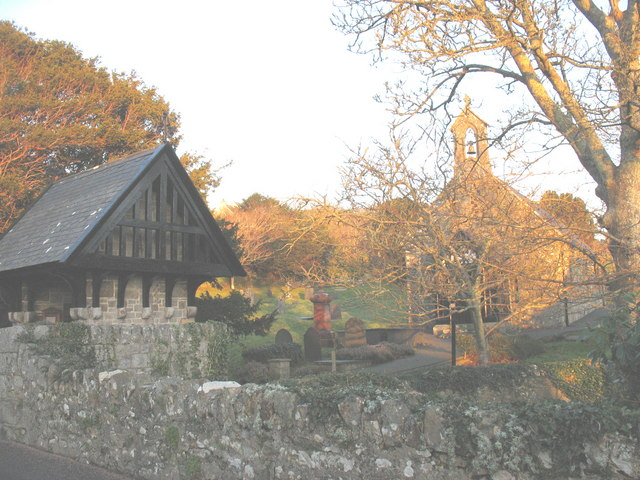
- St Cian's Church

- Location within Gwynedd
- OS grid reference: SH295288
- Community: Llanengan
- Principal area: Gwynedd
- Preserved county: Gwynedd
- Country: Wales
- Sovereign state: United Kingdom
- Post town: PWLLHELI
- Postcode district: LL53
- Dialling code: 01758
- Police: North Wales
- Fire: North Wales
- Ambulance: Welsh
- UK Parliament: Dwyfor Meirionnydd
- Senedd Cymru – Welsh Parliament: Dwyfor Meirionnydd

Llangian (Welsh: Llangïan) is a small village and former civil parish on the Llŷn Peninsula in the Welsh county of Gwynedd. It is located 1 mile (1.6 km) north west of Abersoch, in the community of Llanengan. The parish was abolished in 1934 and divided between Llanengan and Botwnnog.

The village's church of Saint Cian is connected to the Edwards family of Nanhoron.
