= Sarn Meyllteyrn =

Coordinates: 52.860°N 4.616°W

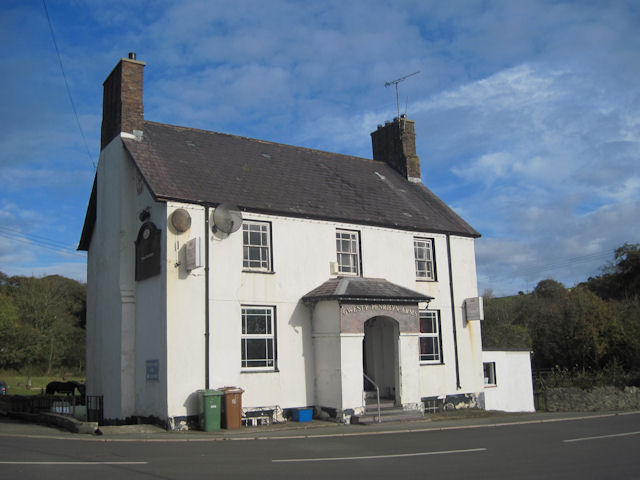
- Penrhyn Arms

- Location within Gwynedd
- OS grid reference: SH239324
- Community: Botwnnog
- Principal area: Gwynedd
- Preserved county: Gwynedd
- Country: Wales
- Sovereign state: United Kingdom
- Post town: PWLLHELI
- Postcode district: LL53
- Dialling code: 01758
- Police: North Wales
- Fire: North Wales
- Ambulance: Welsh
- UK Parliament: Dwyfor Meirionnydd
- Senedd Cymru – Welsh Parliament: Dwyfor Meirionnydd

Sarn Meyllteyrn is a village and former civil parish (known at the time as Mellteyrn) in the Welsh county of Gwynedd. It is in the west of the Llŷn Peninsula (Welsh: Penrhyn Llŷn), 8.4 miles (13.5 km) west of Pwllheli and 24.3 miles (39.2 km) south-west of Caernarfon. The village is often referred to simply as Sarn. The parish was abolished in 1934 and divided between the communities of Botwnnog and Tudweiliog.

== History ==
At the end of the nineteenth century and the beginning of the twentieth Sarn Mellteyrn was apparently a thriving village, surrounded by numerous quarries, and with three mills nearby. There were four public houses, a police station and a National School. The village church, on the northern side of the village, was dedicated to St Peter, known as St Peter ad Vincula (Latin: 'in chains'). It was mostly demolished in the 1990s. The ruins enclose a prehistoric standing stone, probably Bronze Age.

Sarn Mellteyrn has two chapels, Salem and Capel Ty Mawr, both Grade II listed buildings, and both Presbyterian Church of Wales.

== Governance ==
For elections to Gwynedd Council, the village forms part of the electoral division of Botwnnog, Dwyfor, electing one councillor. Gwenno Glyn of Llais Gwynedd was elected in 2012.

== Geography ==
The river Soch runs through the village on its way to Abersoch. The village lies in a small valley with Mynydd Rhiw to the South, Mynydd Cefnamlwch to the North and Carn Fadryn to the North-East.

== Education ==
Primary education is provided by Ysgol Pont y Gôf, in the nearby village of Botwnnog. The school is in the Ysgol Botwnnog catchment area and this is where the majority of pupils go on to complete secondary education.

== Transport ==
Sarn Meyllteyrn lies on the B4413 between Llanbedrog and Aberdaron. Buses from Pwllheli to Aberdaron and Uwchmynydd serve the village and are operated by Nefyn Coaches and Arriva Buses Wales. The nearest railway station is at Pwllheli.
