= Abergeirw =

Coordinates: 52.844°N 3.829°W

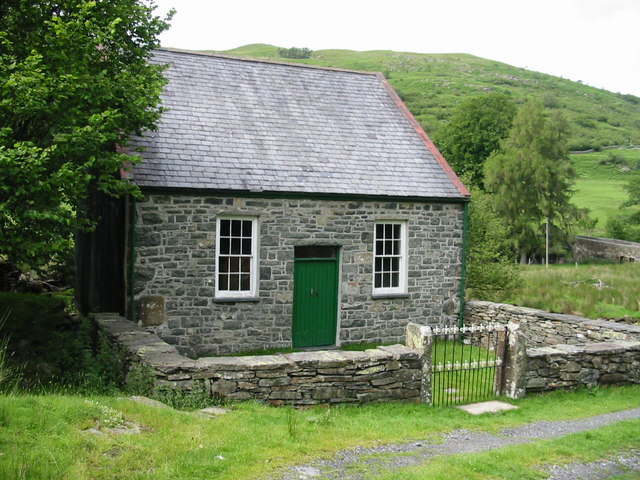
- Abergeirw Chapel

- Location within Gwynedd
- OS grid reference: SH768289
- Community: Brithdir and Llanfachreth
- Principal area: Gwynedd
- Country: Wales
- Sovereign state: United Kingdom
- Post town: DOLGELLAU
- Postcode district: LL40
- Dialling code: 01341
- Police: North Wales
- Fire: North Wales
- Ambulance: Welsh
- UK Parliament: Dwyfor Meirionnydd
- Senedd Cymru – Welsh Parliament: Gwynedd Maldwyn

Abergeirw is a hamlet located in Gwynedd, North Wales.

The village of nine properties is located between Dolgellau and Trawsfynydd.

On 19 December 2008 National Grid plc connected it to the UK national electricity power grid, making it the last village in Wales to be supplied with mains electricity.
