= Llangybi, Gwynedd =

Former civil parish in Gwynedd, Wales

Coordinates: 52.944°N 4.340°W

Llangybi
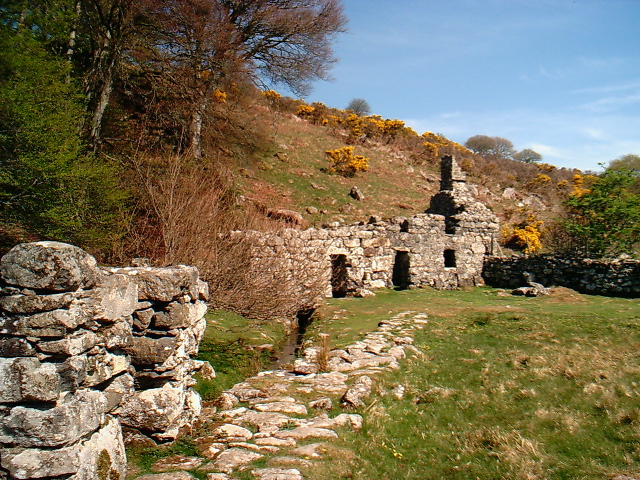
- Ffynnon Gybi

- Location within Gwynedd
- OS grid reference: SH427411
- Community: Llanystumdwy
- Principal area: Gwynedd
- Preserved county: Gwynedd
- Country: Wales
- Sovereign state: United Kingdom
- Post town: PWLLHELI
- Postcode district: LL53
- Dialling code: 01766
- Police: North Wales
- Fire: North Wales
- Ambulance: Welsh
- UK Parliament: Dwyfor Meirionnydd
- Senedd Cymru – Welsh Parliament: Dwyfor Meirionnydd

Llangybi (English: Cybi's Church) is a village and former civil parish in the Eifionydd area of the Welsh county of Gwynedd, near Llanarmon. The parish was abolished in 1934 and divided between Llanystumdwy and Llannor.

== History ==
The parish was described by Samuel Lewis in his A Topographical Dictionary of Wales published in 1833.

"This parish, which derives its name from the dedication of its church to Saint Cybi, an eminent British saint, who flourished towards the close of the sixth century, is pleasantly situated in the south-western portion of the county, and nearly in the centre of the promontory which separates Cardigan bay from the bay of Carnarvon. It is of very considerable extent, and the lands are mostly enclosed and in a good state of cultivation : the surrounding scenery is pleasingly diversified, comprising some fine views of the adjacent country, which abounds with varied and picturesque beauty. At Pontrhyd Goch is a slate quarry, which, however, is worked only on a limited scale, the slates being of rather an inferior quality, and the demand for them confined principally to the immediate neighbour-hood. The road from Carnarvon to Pwllheli passes through the parish.

== St Cybi's Church ==
St Cybi's church is a Grade II* listed building. The lychgate is listed at Grade II and a Celtic cross] in the churchyard, dating from the 7th or 9th century, is a Scheduled monument.

== Ffynnon Cybi (St Cybi's Well) ==
As well as various menhirs, tumuli and stone circles in the countryside around, the village is noted for a holy well, Ffynnon Gybi (English: St Cybi's Well). According to local tradition the girls who wished to know their lover's intentions would spread their pocket-handkerchiefs on the water of the well, and, if the water pushed the handkerchiefs to the south they knew that everything was right and that their lovers were honest and honourable in their intentions; but, if the water shifted the handkerchiefs northwards, they concluded the contrary. The well is a Grade I listed building and a scheduled monument.

== Gallery ==
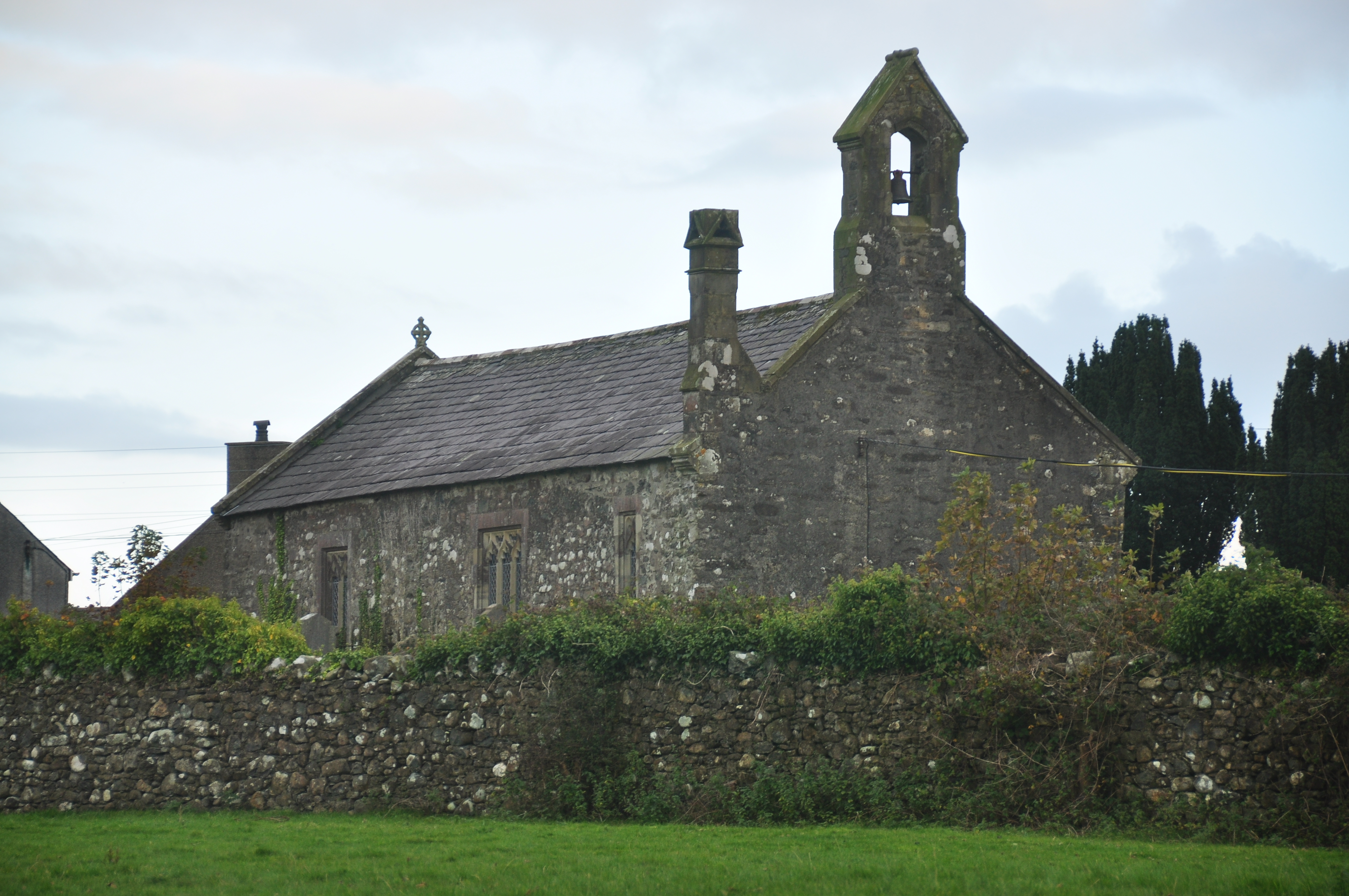
St Cybi's Church

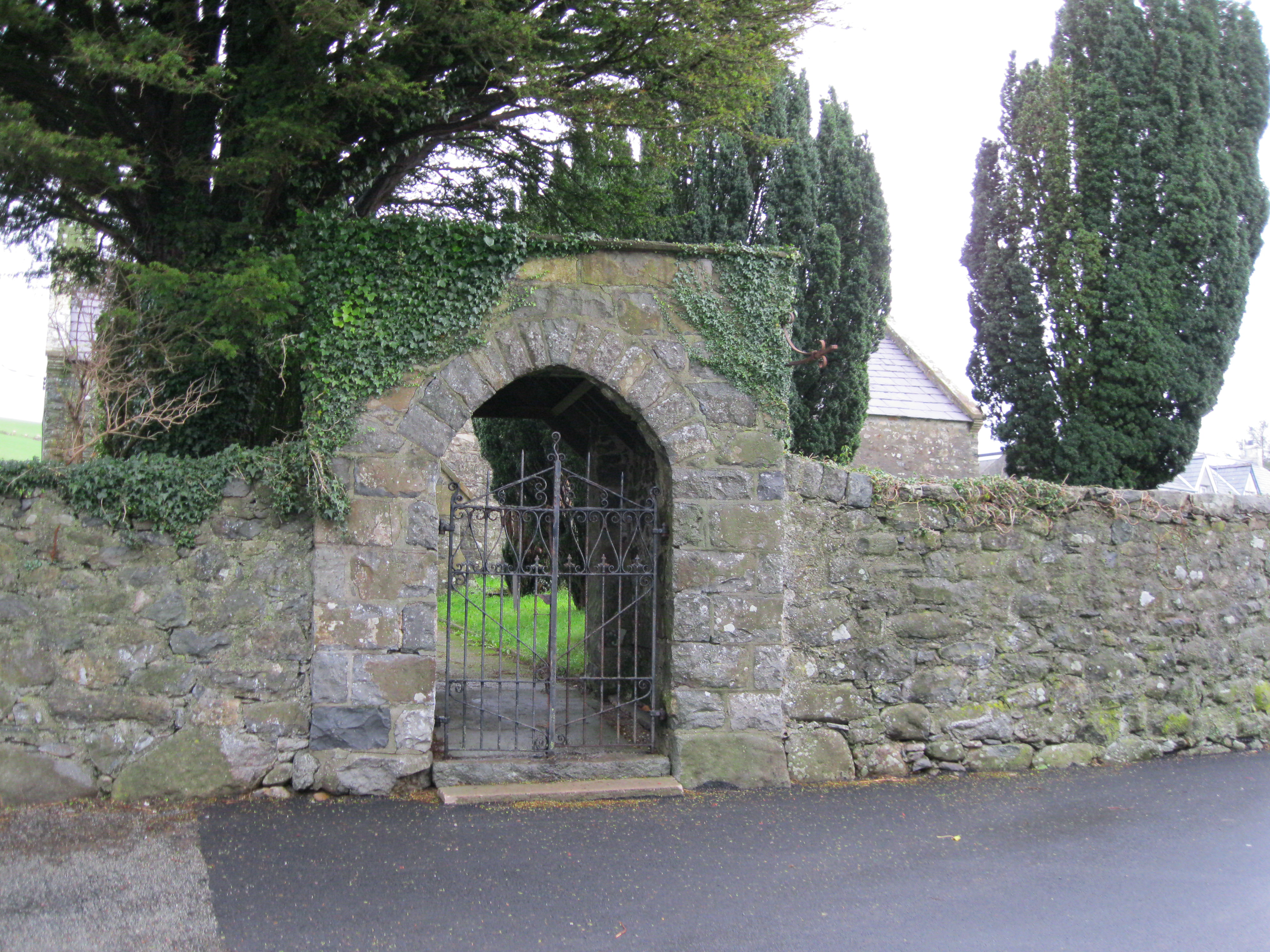
Lychgate

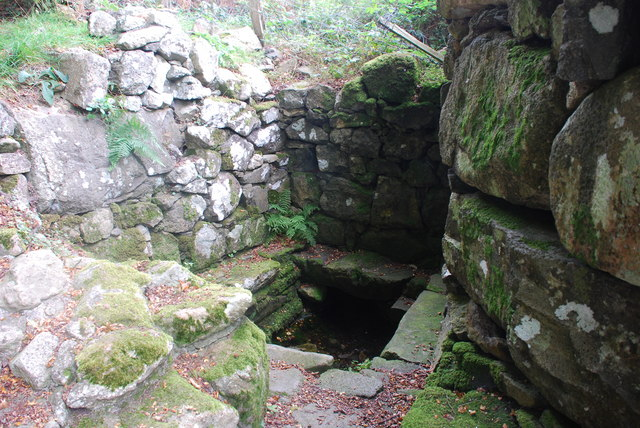
Ffynnon Cybi

== Bibliography ==
Sacred Wells in Wales by John Rhys and T. E. Morris, in Folklore, Vol. 4, No. 1 (Mar., 1893), pp. 55–79
