= Morfa Nefyn =

Coordinates: 52.932°N 4.549°W

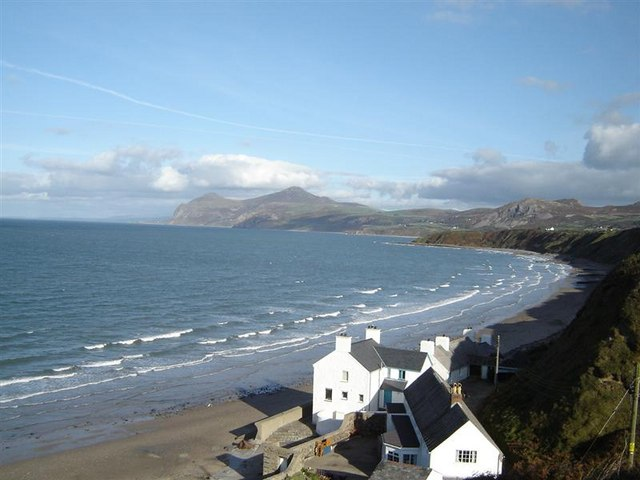
- Morfa Nefyn beach facing Yr Eifl

- Location within Gwynedd
- Population: 1,229 (Ward 2011)
- OS grid reference: SH286402
  - Cardiff: 115 mi (185 km)
- Community: Nefyn
- Principal area: Gwynedd
- Preserved county: Gwynedd
- Country: Wales
- Sovereign state: United Kingdom
- Post town: PWLLHELI
- Postcode district: LL53
- Dialling code: 01758
- Police: North Wales
- Fire: North Wales
- Ambulance: Welsh
- UK Parliament: Dwyfor Meirionnydd
- Senedd Cymru – Welsh Parliament: Dwyfor Meirionnydd

Morfa Nefyn (Welsh pronunciation) is a village on the northern coast of the Llŷn Peninsula in Gwynedd, Wales. It lies on the crossroads of the B4417 and B4412. The village has seen a rise in popularity as house prices in nearby villages on the Llŷn Peninsula such as Abersoch and Llanbedrog have risen rapidly. Many homes are now holiday homes and a complex of holiday flats has recently been built by the entrance to the beach. The neighbouring town of Nefyn has more in the way of shops and services, and Pwllheli is 7 miles (11 km) on the A497 road.

The beach is mainly sand with small amounts of shale. To the west is the fishing hamlet of Porthdinllaen with a pub, the Tŷ Coch Inn, at the top of the beach. Porthdinllaen has a lifeboat station which houses an inshore lifeboat, as well as a dock for the local Coast Guard.

== Welsh language ==
According to the United Kingdom Census 2021, 72.3 per cent of all usual residents aged 3+ in Morfa Nefyn can speak Welsh. The 2011 census noted 72.0 per cent of all usual residents aged 3 years and older in the village could speak Welsh.
