= Botwnnog =

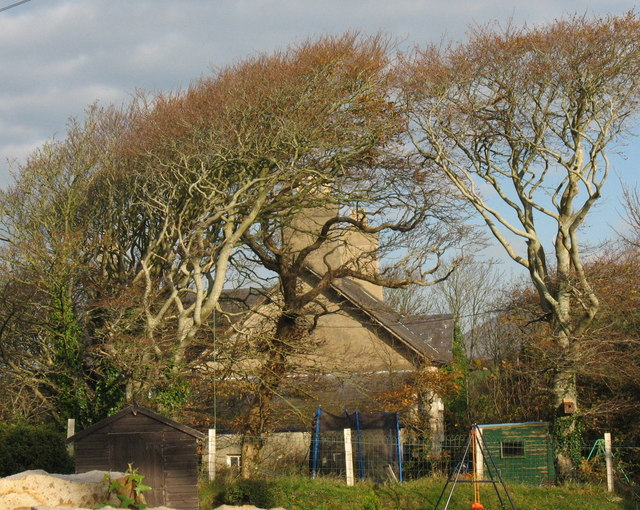
- Ty'r Ysgol

- Location within Gwynedd
- Area: 34.27 km^{2} (13.23 sq mi)
- Population: 996 (2011)
  - Density: 29/km^{2} (75/sq mi)
- OS grid reference: SH260311
- Community: Botwnnog
- Principal area: Gwynedd
- Preserved county: Gwynedd
- Country: Wales
- Sovereign state: United Kingdom
- Post town: PWLLHELI
- Postcode district: LL53
- Dialling code: 01758
- Police: North Wales
- Fire: North Wales
- Ambulance: Welsh
- UK Parliament: Dwyfor Meirionnydd
- Senedd Cymru – Welsh Parliament: Gwynedd Maldwyn
- List of places UK Wales Gwynedd 52.849°N 4.584°W Map of the community

Botwnnog is a village and community in Gwynedd in Wales, located on the Llŷn Peninsula 4 mi (6 km) west-northwest of Abersoch. It is in the historic county of Caernarfonshire. It had a population of 955 in 2001, increasing to 996 at the 2011 Census. The community covers around 34 square kilometres (13.2 sq mi).

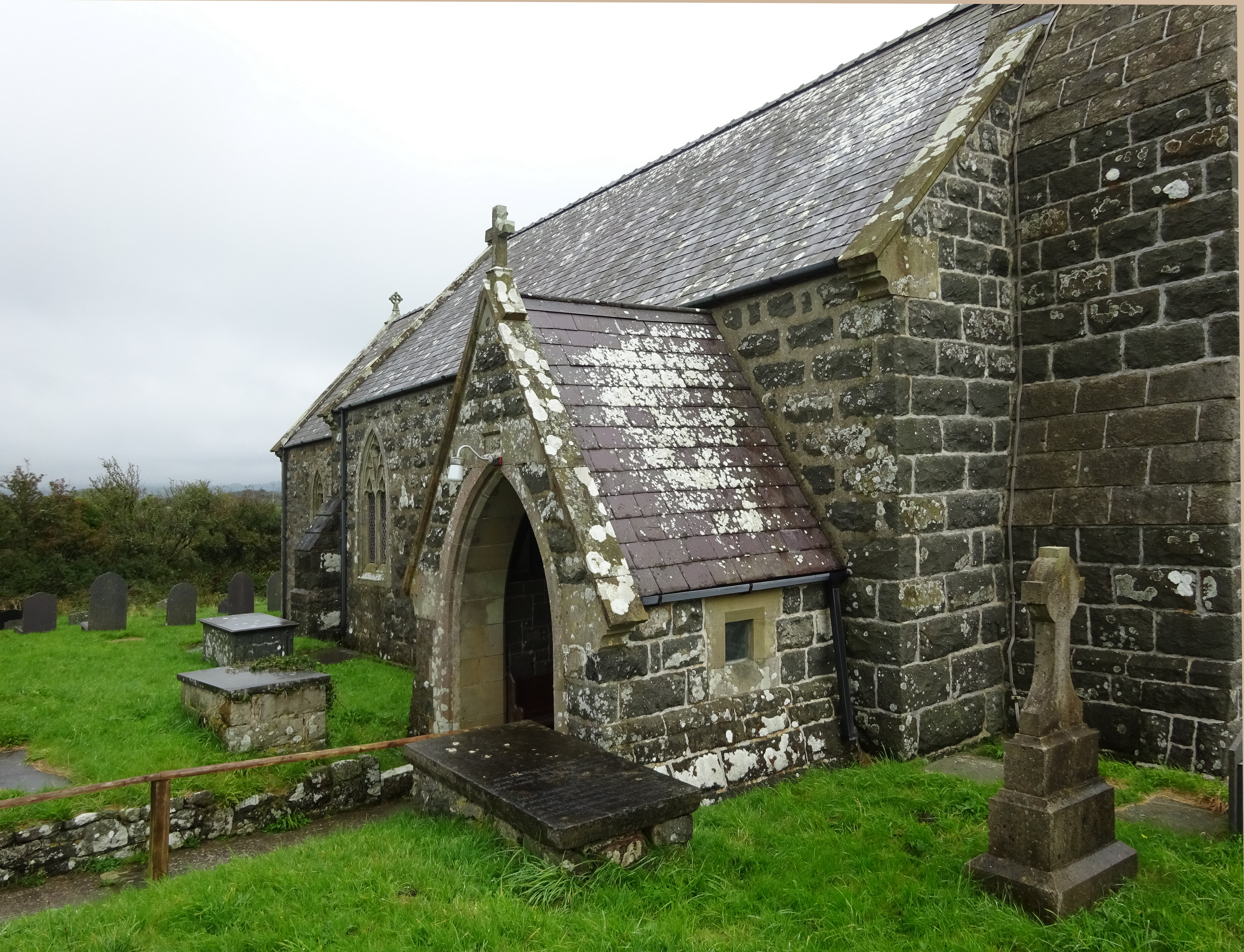
St Beuno's Church, Botwnnog

It lies between Mynytho and Sarn Meyllteyrn (which is in the community), has two schools and a doctors' surgery, Meddygfa Rhydbach.

The artist Moses Griffith (1749–1819) was born in Botwnnog and attended Ysgol Botwnnog. His watercolour Bottwnog church & free school is in the collection of the National Library of Wales. Welsh band Cowbois Rhos Botwnnog come from the small settlement of Rhos Botwnnog.

The community also includes the hamlets of Bryncroes and Llandegwning.

== Education ==
A Welsh-language playgroup Cylch Meithrin Pont Y Gof currently serves the community with the support of Mudiad Meithrin.

Ysgol Gynradd Pont Y Gof provides Welsh-medium primary education to the village and the surrounding villages of Sarn Mellteyrn, Llaniestyn and Garn Fadryn. As of 2024, there were 89 pupils enrolled at the school. 77.5 percent of pupils come from Welsh-speaking homes in 2024.

Ysgol Botwnnog, a bilingual comprehensive school for pupils aged 11 to 16, is also situated in the village.

As of 2024, there are 474 pupils enrolled at the school. According to the latest Estyn inspection report in 2019, three-quarters of pupils come from Welsh-speaking homes. 98 percent of pupils are fluent in Welsh, and Welsh is the main medium of teaching.

Originally, Ysgol Botwnnog was a grammar school founded in 1616 by Henry Rowlands, Bishop of Bangor.
