= North Wales Pilgrim's Way =

Long-distance walking route in north Wales

Coordinates: 53.2867°N 3.2167°W

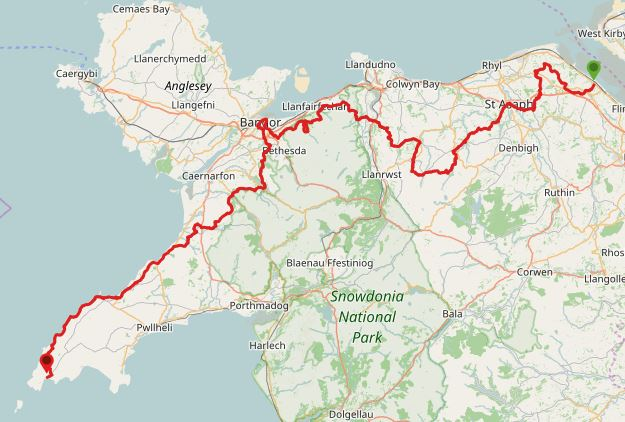
The route of the North Wales Pilgrim's Way

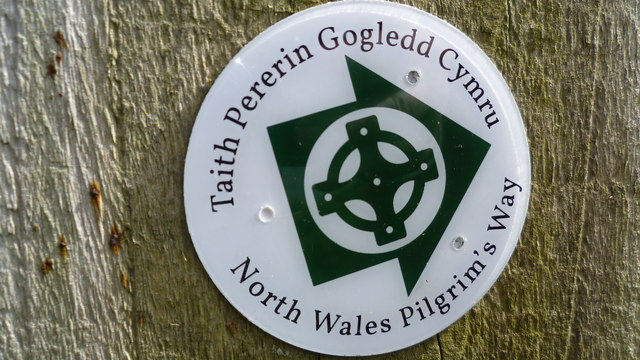
Waymarker disc on the North Wales Pilgrim's Way

The North Wales Pilgrim's Way (Welsh: Taith Pererin Gogledd Cymru) is a long-distance walking route in North Wales, running from near Holywell in the east to Bardsey Island (Welsh: Ynys Enlli) in the west. The first half of the trail takes an inland route, with the second half (from Abergwyngregyn onwards) following the north coast of the Llŷn Peninsula. It measures 133.9 miles (215 km) in length, and was officially launched at Porth y Swnt, Aberdaron on 10 July 2014.

Development of the trail started in 2011, and its official opening followed a number of alterations to the original route to suit local concerns.

The route, which is marked by waymarker disks, makes use of existing public rights of way, including sections of the Wales Coast Path, and along the way it visits many small stone churches, many dedicated to key Celtic Saints, which can provide shelter and rest along the trail. Whilst, historically, pilgrims would have made their way across North Wales to Bardsey Island, known as the legendary 'Island of 20,000 Saints', the trail is a modern interpretation, and does not necessarily follow old routes.

The Trail is a part of the 'Our Heritage' project, a part of Cadw’s Heritage Tourism Project; this is partially funded by the European Regional Development Fund via the Welsh Government.

Dr. Rowan Williams, a Welsh Anglican bishop, theologian and poet, and former archbishop of Canterbury, is patron of the route.

An annual pilgrimage is organised along the full length of the route for a fortnight every May/June, and in 2018 the North Wales Pilgrim's Way Ultra - a 3-day race - saw runners competing for the North Wales Pilgrims Way Brass Shield.

== Historical basis ==
Since the 7th Century pilgrims in North Wales have visited four main sites – Holywell, Gwytherin, Clynnog Fawr and Bardsey Island. The first three have associations with two Welsh Saints, namely Saint Winifred and Saint Beuno; the North Wales Pilgrim's Way links many of the locations associated with them.

Saint Winifred (or Winefride) (Welsh: Gwenffrewi) was a 7th-century Welsh Christian woman, around whom many historical legends have formed. A healing spring at the traditional site of her decapitation and restoration is now a shrine and pilgrimage site called St Winefride's Well in Holywell, and known as the Lourdes of Wales.

Saint Beuno (sometimes anglicized as 'Bono') was a 7th-century Welsh abbot, confessor, and saint.

Bardsey Island has been an important religious site since Saint Cadfan built a monastery there in 516, and in medieval times it was a major centre of pilgrimage.

== Route ==
The trail runs from east to west, starting at Basingwerk Abbey (Welsh: Abaty Dinas Basing), a Grade I listed ruined abbey near Holywell, Flintshire, and ends at Aberdaron on the western tip of the Llŷn Peninsula (Welsh: Penrhyn Llŷn) in Gwynedd. From here, a final part of the route, regarded as optional, is the boat trip (weather permitting) from Aberdaron to Bardsey Island; the boat sails from Porth Meudwy, which is 1.2 miles (1.8 km) from Aberdaron by the Coastal Path footpath.

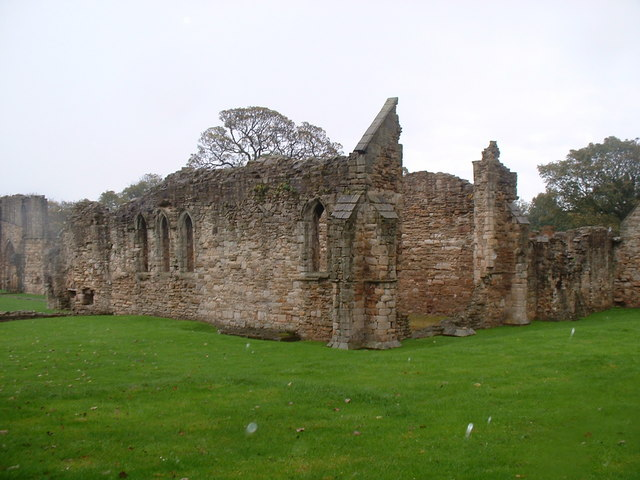
Basingwerk Abbey, the start of the Trail

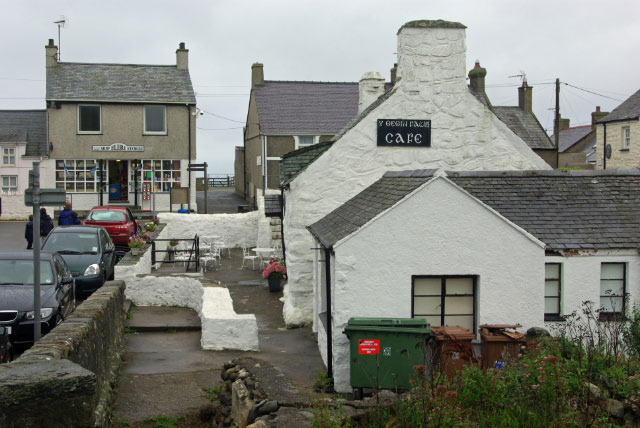
Aberdaron, the end of the Trail. Y Gegin Fawr (the white building), built in the 13th century for pilgrims, now serves as a tearoom.

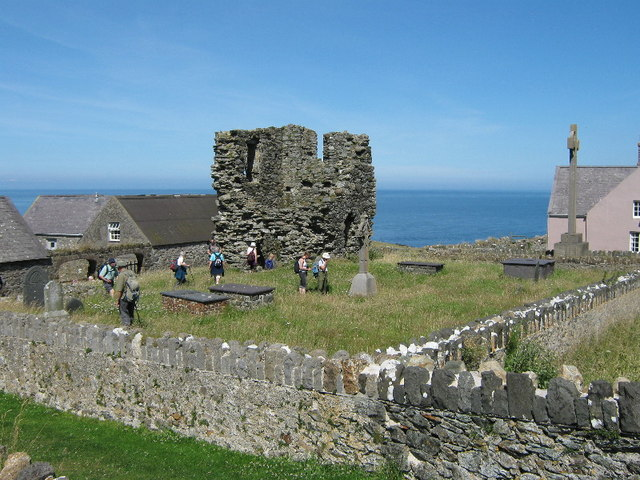
The remains of St Mary's Abbey on Bardsey Island

For marketing purposes the Trail is divided into 25 short sections:

- 1 - Basingwerk Abbey to Pantasaph (3 miles / 4.6 km)
- 2 - Pantasaph to Maen Achwyfan (Whitford) (3.3 miles / 5.3 km)
- 3 - Maen Achwgfan to Llanasa (2.7 miles / 4.3 km)
- 4 - Llanasa to Trelawnyd (2.4 miles / 3.8 km)
- 5 - Trelawnyd to Tremeirchion (6 miles / 9.6 km)
- 6 - Tremeirchion to St Asaph (3.5 miles /5.6 km)
- 7 - St Asaph to Llannefydd (6.3 miles /10.1 km)
- 8 - Llannefydd to Llansannan (4.5 miles / 7.2 km)
- 9 - Llansannan to Gwytherin (7.0 miles / 11.3 km)
- 10 - Gwytherin to Pandy Tudur (3.4 miles / 5.5 km)
- 11 - Pandy Tudur to Llangernyw (2.5 miles / 4 km)
- 12 - Llangernyw to Eglwysbach (7.5 miles / 12 km)
- 13 - Eglwysbach to Rowen (3.5 miles / 6 km)
- 14 - Rowen to Penmaenmawr Stone Circles (4.4 miles / 7.0 km)
- 15 - Penmaenmawr Stone Circles to Abergwyngregyn (6.6 miles / 10.6 km)
- 16 - Abergwyngregyn to Bangor (12.33m / 19.84 km)
- 17 - Bangor to Llanberis (10.6m / 17.1 km)
- 18 - Llanberis to Waunfawr (4.5 miles / 7.3 km)
- 19 - Waunfawr to Penygroes (7.1 miles / 11.5 km)
- 20 - Penygroes to Clynnog Fawr (6.3 miles / 10.5 km)
- 21 - Clynnog Fawr to Trefor (4 miles / 6 km)
- 22 - Trefor to Nefyn (6.3 miles / 9.6 km)
- 23 - Nefyn to Towyn (Tudweiliog) (6.8 miles / 11 km)
- 24 - Towyn (Tudweiliog) to Porth Oer (Whistling Sands) (8 miles / 13 km)
- 25 - Porth Oer to Aberdaron (3.3 miles / 5.4 km)
- (26 - Boat trip to Bardsey Island)

== Pilgrim passport stamps ==
A 'Pilgrim Passport' (a souvenir leaflet) can be obtained from the Greenfield Valley Heritage Park Visitor Centre at the start of the route at Basingwerk Abbey, or from other churches visited along the route. A total of 23 churches and other locations passed have available a passport stamp, enabling the walker to 'stamp their passport' as they visit the sites along the way. Each stamp is different, and has been designed by primary school children from schools along the route to reflect the ancient landmarks, sites and legends encountered on the trail. Artist Ruth Thomas worked with Flintshire and Denbighshire schoolchildren to achieve this, whilst artist Eleri Jones worked with schools in Conwy and Gwynedd.

== Sacred Doorways Trail ==
Marketed alongside the Pilgrim's Way in the counties of Conwy, Denbighshire and Flintshire is the 'Sacred Doorways' project (Welsh: Drysau Cysegredig) which features churches and chapels of interest.

The churches involved in the project are:

Conwy cluster -

- St Michael's, Llanfihangel Glyn Myfyr;
- St Mary Magdalene's, Cerrigydrudion;
- St John's, Ysbyty Ifan;
- St Tudclud's, Penmachno;
- St Gwyddelan's, Dolwyddelan;
- St Michael's, Betws-y-coed;
- St Mary's, Betws-y-coed;
- St Julitta's, Capel Curig;
- St Rhychwyn's, Llanrhychwyn;
- St Mary's, Trefriw;
- St Peter's, Llanbedr-y-Cennin;
- St Mary's, Caerhun;
- St Celynnin's, Llangelynnin;
- Zion Chapel, Rowen;
- St Grwst's, Llanrwst;
- Seion Chapel, Llanrwst;
- St Doged's, Llanddoged;
- St Martin's, Eglwysbach;
- St Digain's, Llangernyw;
- St Mary's, Llanfair Talhaiarn;
- St Sannan's, Llansannan

Denbighshire cluster -

- Ss Mael & Sulien, Corwen;
- St Trillo's, Llandrillo;
- St Elidan's, Llanelidan;
- St Bridget's, Carrog;
- St Tysilio's, Bryneglwys;
- Corpus Christi, Tremeirchion

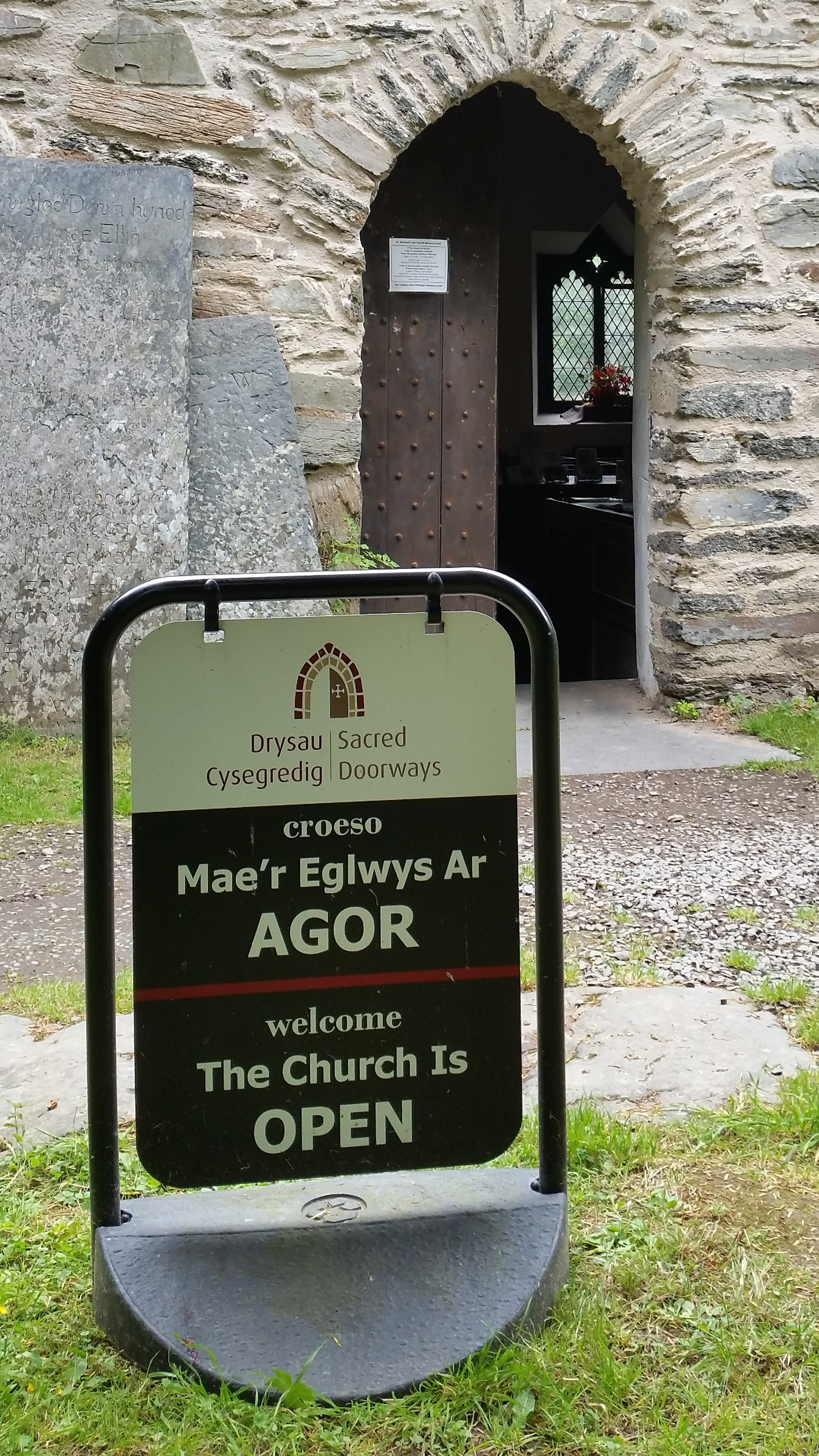
The Sacred Doorways sign outside St Michael's church, Betws-y-coed

Flintshire cluster -

- Ss Beuno & Mary, Whitford;
- St Michael's, Caerwys;
- Ss Asaph & Cyndeyrn, Llanasa;
- St Mary Magdalene's, Gwaenysgor (Trelawnyd);
- St James, Holywell;
- Ss Mael & Sulien, Cwm

The front cover of the Sacred Doorways Pilgrim's Passport

In the Conwy Valley a Sacred Doorways Trail - a tourism initiative funded through Conwy's Rural Development plan - links together some of the most interesting churches and chapels in that area. These churches also have a Pilgrim's Way passport stamp - and there is space on the passport for them - although they are not strictly on the Pilgrim's Way Trail.

The Pilgrims Passport claims:

From saints to sinners, princes to pilgrims, and bards to bandits, the Sacred Doorways church and chapel trails guide you through thousands of years of our fascinating history.

The four trails in Conwy are packaged into clusters, and can be undertaken on foot, using public footpaths, or in a car.

The trails comprise:

- Sacred Hiraethog (visiting St Michael's Church at Llanfihangel Glyn Myfyr, St Mary Magdalene's Church at Cerrigydrudion, the Parish Church at Pentrefoelas, St John's Church at Ysbyty Ifan, and St Tudclud's Church at Penmachno) - a total of 17 miles / 27 km
- Sacred Snowdonia (visiting St Gwyddelan's Church at Dolwyddelan, St Mary's and St Michael's Churches at Betws-y-coed, and St Julitta's Church at Capel Curig) - a total of 16 miles / 25 km
- Sacred Kingdom (visiting St Grwst's Church and Gwydir Chapel at Llanrwst, St Doged's Church at Llanddoged, Gwydir Uchaf near Llanrwst, St Rhychwyn's Church at Llanrhychwyn, and St Mary's Church at Trefriw) - a total of 9 miles / 14 km
- Sacred Landscapes (visiting St Peter's Church at Llanbedr-y-cennin, St Mary's Church at Caerhun, Zion Chapel at Rowen, and St Celynnin's Church at Llangelynnin) - a total of 7.5 miles / 12 km

The four trails can be linked together by walking an additional 10 miles / 16 km.

(Note - there is a similarly named 'Sacred Door Trail' - a 200-mile interfaith pilgrimage trail - in south-western Montana).

== Maps and guides ==
Route maps of the Pilgrim's Way can be downloaded from the main website, and the committee has approved a guide book - The Pilgrim's Way / Taith Pererin Gogledd Cymru by Mike Stevens, published by local publishers Kittiwake Books.

Chris Potter has produced an up-to-date guide book on behalf of the North Wales Pilgrim's Way Committee. It is titled 'North Wales Pilgrim's Way - The Official Guide to the Welsh Camino'. It is available through the website https://pilgrims-way-north-wales.org/

Route maps of the Sacred Doorways trails are available on a downloadable leaflet.

== Access ==
Some churches and chapels on the trail rely on the generosity of volunteers to open and close them daily. Furthermore, churches may not be open during the winter months. If the building is not open, details of where to obtain the key will be available near the church or chapel entrance.

== See also ==
- Llŷn Coastal Path
- Wales Coast Path
- The Pilgrims Way (in Southern England)
- Long-distance footpaths in Wales
- Long-distance footpaths in the United Kingdom
