= Llŷn Coastal Path =

Coastal long-distance footpath in north-west Wales

Coordinates: 53.145°N 4.269°W

North Wales Path

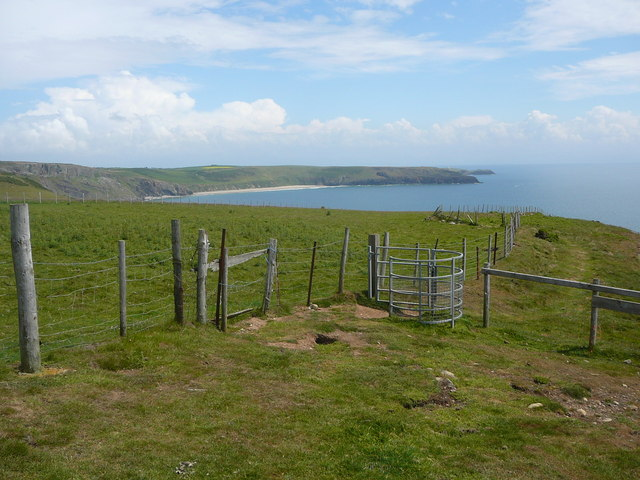
North east of Trwyn Cila

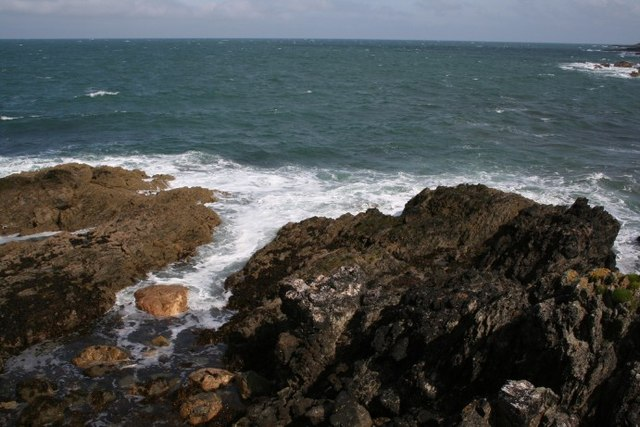
The coast near Porth Ychain

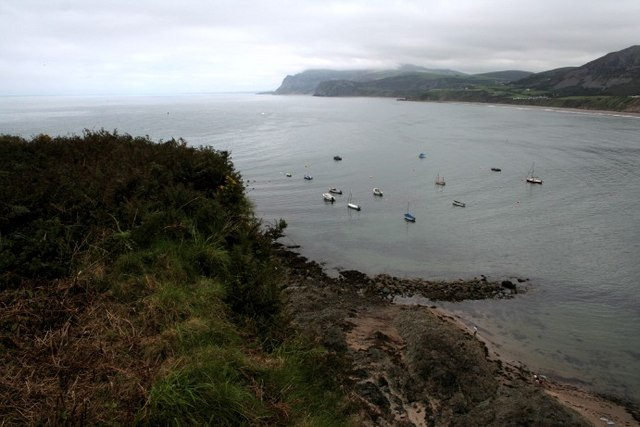
The coast near Nefyn

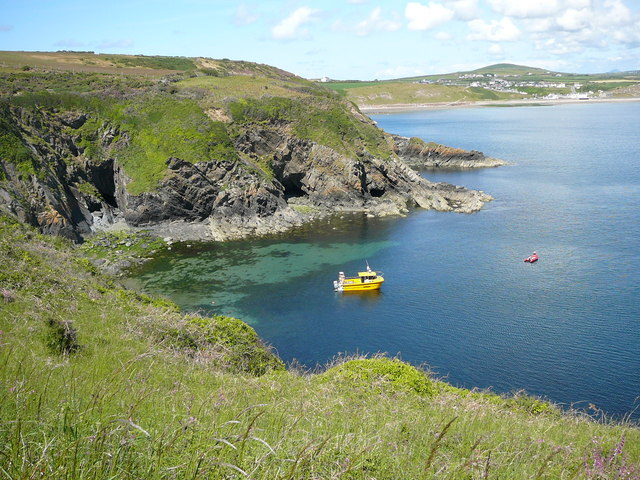
Porth Meudwy, near Aberdaron

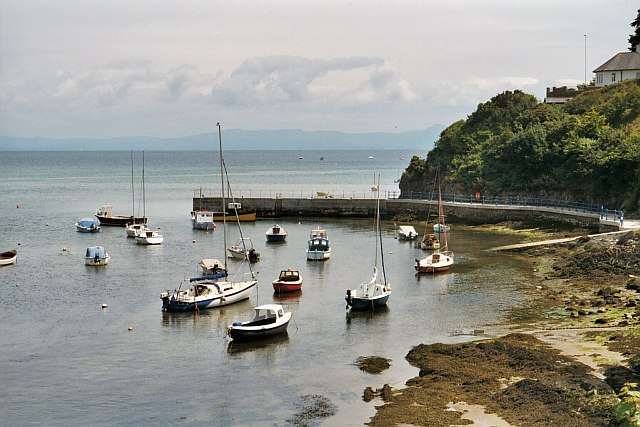
Abersoch harbour

The Llŷn Coastal Path (Welsh: Llwybr Arfordir Llŷn) is a waymarked 146-kilometre (91 mi) long-distance footpath running along the coast of the Llŷn Peninsula from Caernarfon to Porthmadog in Gwynedd, north-west Wales. A large part of the Llŷn Peninsula is designated an Area of Outstanding Natural Beauty.

Devised and implemented by Gwynedd County Council and the Countryside Council for Wales, the path opened in 2006, though it has since been changed and improved. This work is continuing as part of the path's integration into the Wales Coast Path, an 870-mile (1,400 km) long-distance walking route around the whole coast of Wales from Chepstow to Queensferry.

== Description ==
The route passes through hidden coves and beaches, along cliff-top paths, through small harbours and towns such as Caernarfon and Porthmadog, detours slightly inland where it rises to as much as 980 feet (300 m) and covers the coast of both north and south Llŷn. Snowdonia, Wales’ biggest National Park, lies to the east and the Irish Sea to the west. The weather in these parts can be unpredictable.

The Coastal Path is partly based on an ancient pilgrimage route to Bardsey Island, now a National Nature Reserve.

Wildlife is abundant in this area, and bottle-nosed dolphins and Atlantic grey seals can often be seen in the coastal waters. In the dunes there are stonechats, goldfinches, and sand martins. Migratory birds pass this way too, so autumn brings the arrival of redwings, chaffinches, starlings and skylarks. The rare chough breeds in small numbers.

== The route ==
The route can be split into seven main sections, though the official guidebook divides it into nine.

- Caernarfon–Trefor

Caernarfon–Llanfaglan
Llanfaglan–Groeslon
Groeslon–Aberdesach
Aberdesach–Trefor

- Trefor–Morfa Nefyn

Trefor–Penrhyn Glas
Penrhyn Glas–Porth Dinllaen

- Morfa Nefyn–Llangwnnadl

Porth Dinllaen–Porth Ysgaden
Porth Ysgaden–Porth Widlin

- Llangwnnadl–Aberdaron

Porth Widlin–Porth Orion
Porth Orion–Aberdaron

- Aberdaron–Abersoch

Aberdaron–Plas yn Rhiw
Plas yn Rhiw–Porth Neigwl
Porth Neigwl–Machroes
Machroes–Llanbedrog Beach

- Abersoch–Pwllheli

Llanbedrog Beach–Pwllheli

- Pwllheli–Criccieth–Porthmadog

Pwllheli–Pen-ychain
Pen-ychain–Criccieth
Criccieth–Porthmadog

== See also ==
- North Wales Path
- Anglesey Coastal Path
- Ceredigion Coast Path
