= Gower and Swansea Bay Coast Path =

Section of the Wales Coast Path

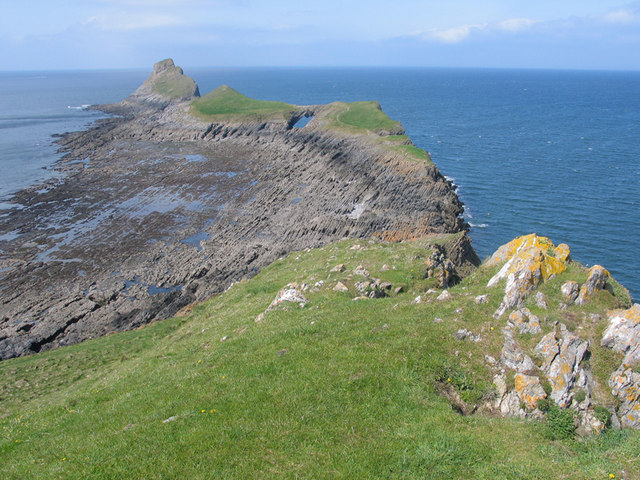
- Worm's Head peninsula
- Length: 97 mi (156 km)
- Location: Wales
- Designation: Long distance footpath
- Trailheads: Loughor, Swansea; 51.66261°N 4.06461°W; Kenfig Dunes, Port Talbot; 51.5153°N 3.7272°W
- Use: Hiking
- Difficulty: Easy
- Season: All year

Trail map
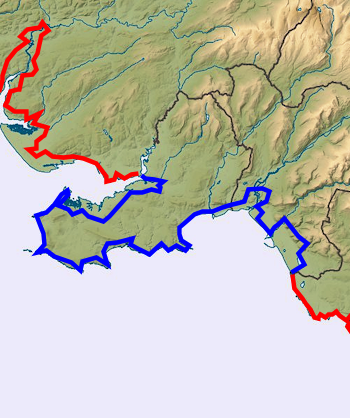

The Gower and Swansea Bay Coast Path (Welsh: Llwybr arfordir Penrhyn Gŵyr a Bae Abertawe) is part of the Wales Coast Path, an 870-mile (1,400 km) long-distance walking route around the whole coast of Wales that opened in 2012. The Gower and Swansea Bay section is 97 miles (156 km) in length, running along the coast of the Gower Peninsula from Loughor, Swansea to Kenfig Dunes near Port Talbot, South Wales. The number of people using the Wales Coast Path (October 2011 to September 2012) in the Swansea local authority area was 349,333.

The path passes through the first area in Britain to be designated an Area of Outstanding Natural Beauty (1956) and is home to 10 nature reserves, 24 Wildlife Trust reserves, 32 Sites of Special Scientific Interest and five Special Areas of Conservation. The path is maintained and administered by two county councils, Swansea and Neath Port Talbot.

The highest point of Gower is The Beacon at Rhossili Down at 193 metres (633 ft) overlooking Rhossili Bay. Pwll Du and the Bishopton Valley form a statutory Local Nature Reserve. The southern coast consists of a series of small, rocky or sandy bays, such as Langland and Three Cliffs, and larger beaches such as Port Eynon, Rhossili and Oxwich Bay. The north of the peninsula has fewer beaches, and is home to the cockle-beds of Penclawdd.

== Points of interest ==
The Whiteford Point Lighthouse (built in 1865) is the only offshore cast iron lighthouse in Britain. Further south stands the Worm's Head peninsula, named for its resemblance to a resting dragon. Worm's Head is best viewed from Rhossili Bay which, in 2013, was voted the UK's number one beach, third best in Europe, and 10th best in the world, by TripAdvisor users. Aberavon Beach is a two-mile (3.2 km) strip of white sands, with views across Swansea Bay to the Gower Peninsula.

== See also ==
- Pembrokeshire Coast Path
- South Wales Coast and Severn Estuary Coastal Path
