= Sychnant Pass =

Mountain pass in North Wales

Coordinates: 53.2750°N 3.8800°W

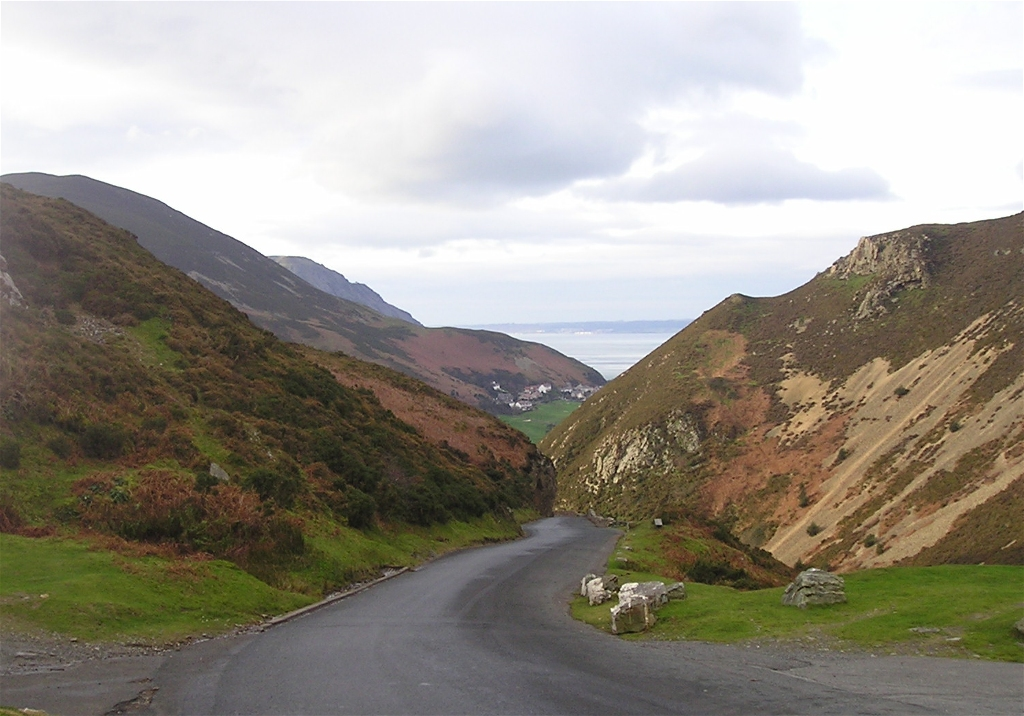
Sychnant Pass

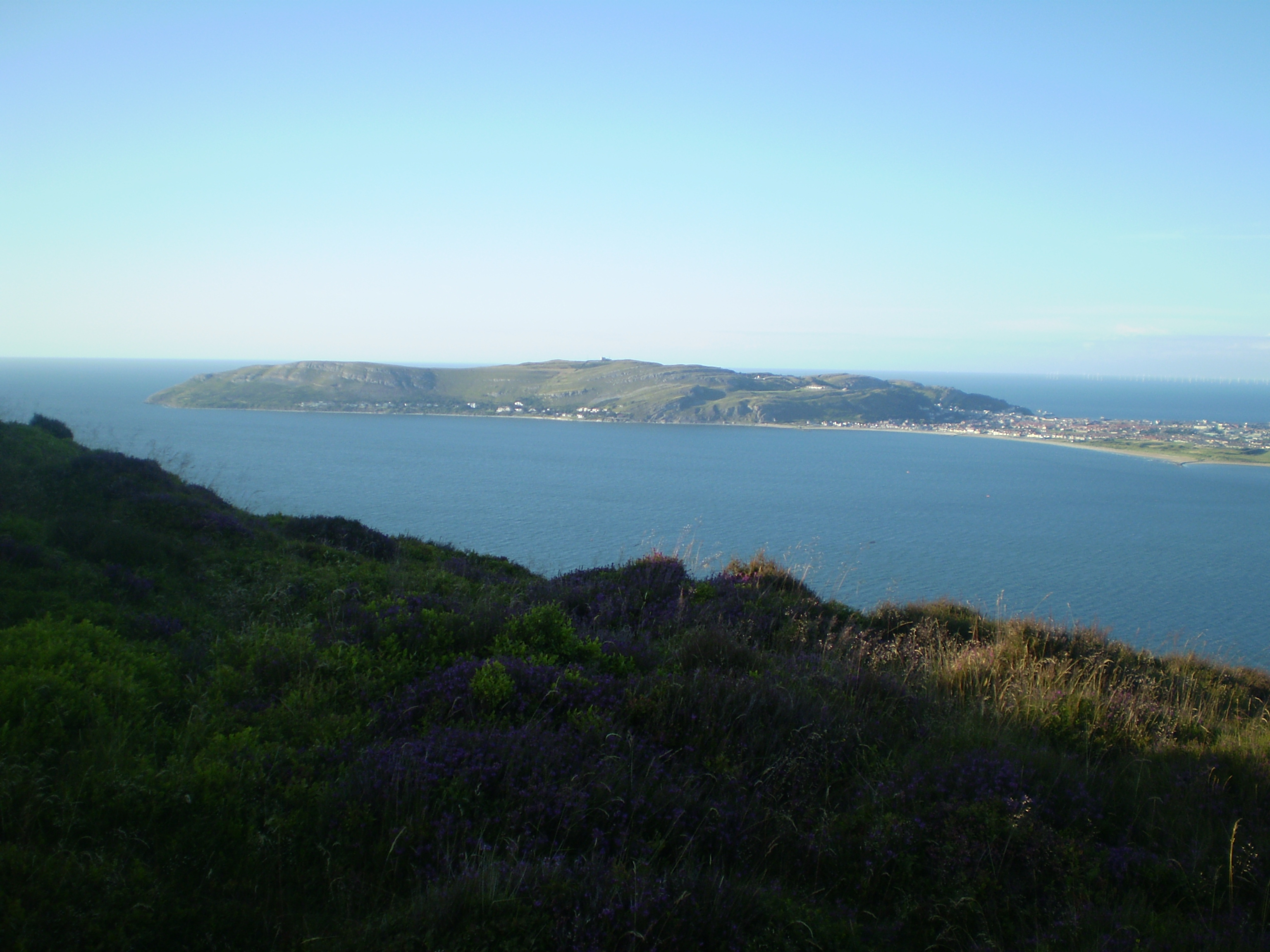
Great Orme from Penmaenbach summit

Sychnant Pass (Welsh: Bwlch Sychnant, lit. 'dry-stream pass') in Conwy County Borough, Wales, links Conwy to Penmaenmawr via Dwygyfylchi. Much of the pass is in Snowdonia National Park, and a large area of land within it has been designated a Site of Special Scientific Interest. At the bottom is the village of Capelulo.

Before the coming of the railway to the North Wales coast, the road through Sychnant Pass was the route of choice for mail coaches at high tide, when the faster and safer route along the sands was unusable. After leaving Conwy, the route runs westward through the valley on the south side of Conwy Mountain (Mynydd y Dref), which is topped by the hillfort of Castell Caer Seion. There are parallel tracks and footpaths (including the North Wales Path) on Conwy Mountain for most of the way.

Also Allt-Wen (837 ft, 255 m) and Penmaenbach (804 ft, 245 m) can be climbed from here.

At the western end of the valley, the Sychnant Pass Road runs between the stone walls of the Pensychnant estate and through a narrow gap in the surrounding hills before descending steeply to the valley floor at Capelulo, reputedly the site of an early medieval chapel of Saint Ulo. Here there are two inns, a restaurant and a bistro, and in the ravine behind the inns is Nant Ddaear-y-llwynog (the Fairy Glen), a Victorian nature trail. From Capelulo it is an easy walk or short drive to the coast at Penmaenmawr.
