= Gwynedd =

County in Wales

- County
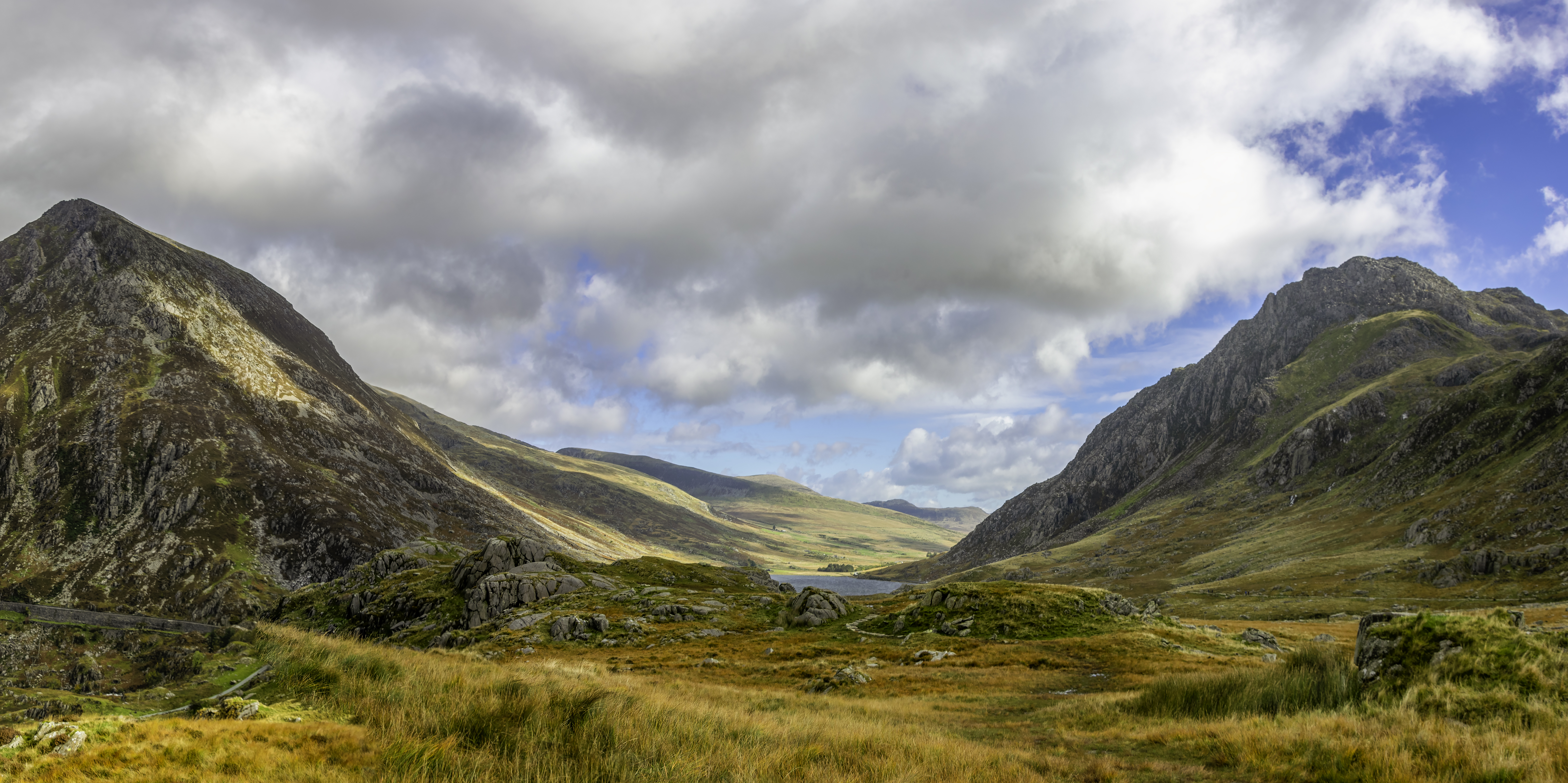
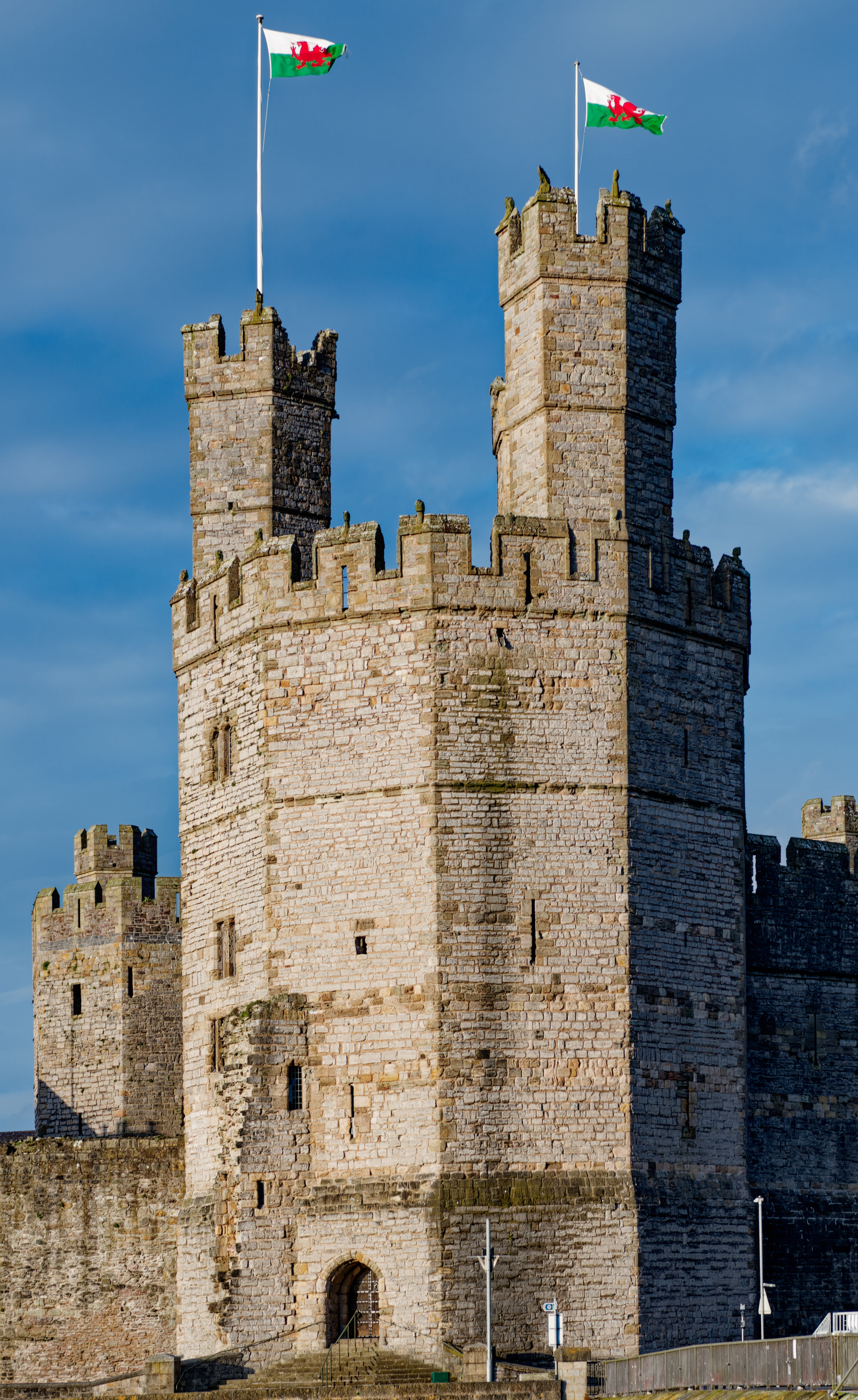
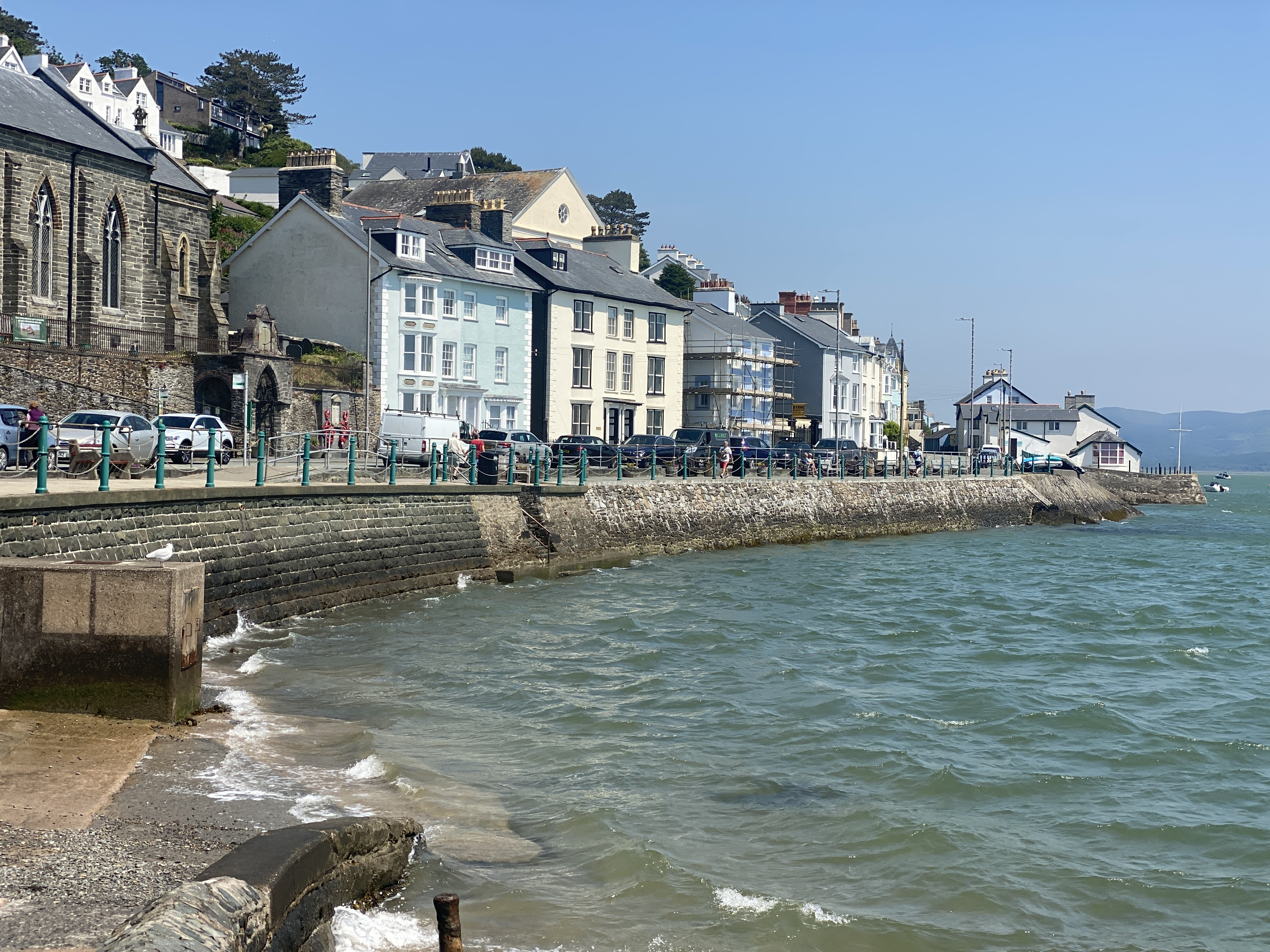
- Clockwise from top: The Ogwen Valley in Snowdonia; Aberdyfi; Caernarfon Castle

- Coat of arms
- Motto(s): Welsh: Cadernid Gwynedd, lit. 'the strength of Gwynedd'
- Gwynedd shown within Wales
- Coordinates: 52°50′N 3°55′W
- Sovereign state: United Kingdom
- Country: Wales
- Incorporated: 1 April 1996
- Administrative HQ: Council Offices, Caernarfon

Government
  - Type: Principal council
  - Body: Gwynedd Council (Cyngor Gwynedd)
  - Control: Plaid Cymru
  - MPs: 2 MPs: Claire Hughes (L); Liz Saville Roberts (PC)
  - MSs: 12 MSs: 6 in Bangor Conwy Môn; 6 in Gwynedd Maldwyn

Area
  - Total: 979 sq mi (2,535 km^{2})
  - Rank: 2nd

Population (2025)
  - Total: 120,295
  - Rank: 14th
  - Density: 120/sq mi (47/km^{2})

Welsh language (2021)
  - Speakers: 64.4%
  - Rank: 1st
- Time zone: UTC+0 (GMT)
  - Summer (DST): UTC+1 (BST)
- ISO 3166 code: GB-GWN
- GSS code: W06000002
- Website: gwynedd.llyw.cymru

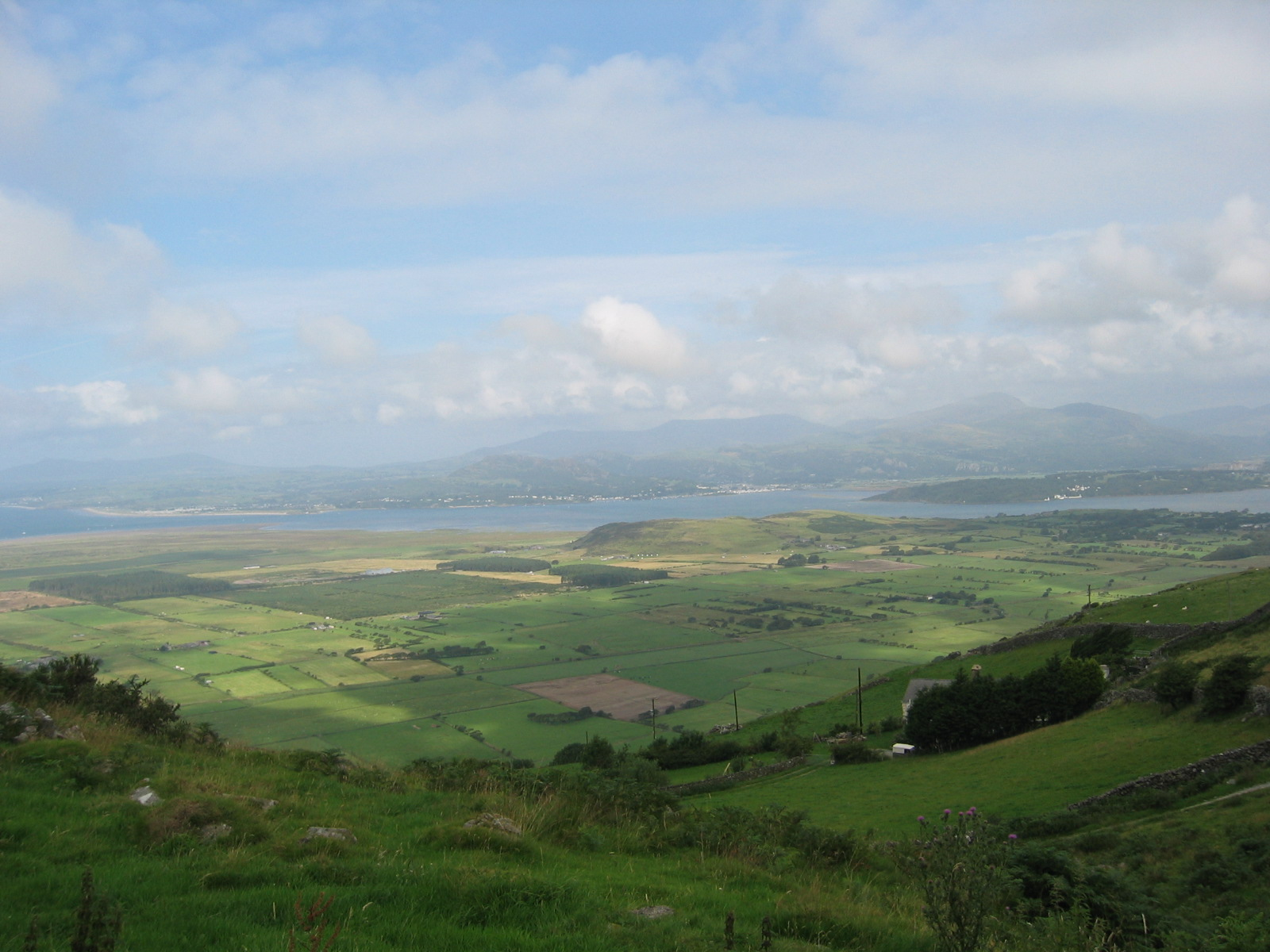
View of Tremadog Bay

Gwynedd (Welsh: [ˈɡwɨnɛð]) is a county in the north-west of Wales. It borders Anglesey across the Menai Strait to the north, Conwy County Borough, Denbighshire, and Powys to the east, Ceredigion over the Dyfi estuary to the south, and the Irish Sea to the west. The city of Bangor is the largest settlement, and the administrative centre is Caernarfon. The preserved county of Gwynedd, which is used for ceremonial purposes, includes the Isle of Anglesey.

Gwynedd is the second largest county in Wales but sparsely populated, with an area of 979 square miles (2,540 km^{2}) and an estimated population of 120,295 in 2025. Bangor and Caernarfon are both in the north of the county, on the Menai Strait. The county's south-west coast is part of Cardigan Bay, and the towns of Pwllheli, Porthmadog, Barmouth, and Tywyn lie on it. Inland towns include Bethesda in the north, Blaenau Ffestiniog in the centre, and Bala in the east. Gwynedd is a heartland of the Welsh language; at the 2021 census, 64.4 per cent of the population reported being able to speak it, the highest percentage of any Welsh local authority.

The geography of Gwynedd is mountainous, with a long coastline to the west. The county contains much of Snowdonia, or Eryri, which occupies most of the centre and south of the county and has been designated a national park. The northern part, shared with Conwy County Borough, contains all 15 mountains in Wales with a height of over 3,000 feet (914 metres). These include Snowdon, or Yr Wyddfa, which at 3,560 feet (1,085 m) is Wales' highest mountain. The mountains enclose several lakes and reservoirs, and the largest lake in Wales, Llyn Tegid, lies in the east. In the west, the Llŷn Peninsula separates Tremadog Bay from the wider Irish Sea and has been designated a national landscape for its scenic coastline. Several of the county's rivers discharge into the bay, having risen in Snowdonia, and its coast is indented by the estuaries of the Glaslyn and Dwyryd, Mawddach, and Dyfi. The last forms part of the boundaries with Ceredigion and Powys.

The area that is now Gwynedd has played a prominent part in the history of Wales. It formed part of the core of the Kingdom of Gwynedd and the native Principality of Wales, which under the House of Aberffraw maintained its independence from the Kingdom of England until Edward I's conquest between 1277 and 1283. Edward built the castles at Caernarfon and Harlech, which form part of a World Heritage Site, the Castles and Town Walls of King Edward in Gwynedd. During the Industrial Revolution the slate industry rapidly developed; in the late 19th century the neighbouring Penrhyn and Dinorwic quarries were the largest in the world, and the Slate Landscape of Northwest Wales is now a World Heritage Site. Gwynedd covers the majority of the historic counties of Caernarfonshire and Merionethshire.

== Toponymy ==
In the past, historians such as J. E. Lloyd assumed that the Celtic source of the word Gwynedd meant 'collection of tribes' – the same root as the Irish fine, meaning 'tribe'. Further, a connection is recognised between the name and the Irish Féni, an early ethnonym for the Irish themselves, related to fían, 'company of hunting and fighting men, company of warriors under a leader'. Perhaps *u̯en-, u̯enə ('strive, hope, wish') is the Indo-European stem. The Irish settled in NW Wales, and in Dyfed, at the end of the Roman era. Venedotia was the Latin form, and in Penmachno there is a memorial stone from c. AD 500 which reads: Cantiori hic iacit Venedotis ('Here lies Cantiorix, citizen of Gwynedd'). The name was retained by the Brythons when the kingdom of Gwynedd was formed in the 5th century, and it remained until the invasion of Edward I. This historical name was revived when the new county was formed in 1974.

== History ==
Left: The 1974 to 1996 administrative county, with five districts including Anglesey and Aberconwy.

Right: The successor lieutenancy preserved county comprising the modern county of the same name and the separate county of the Isle of Anglesey.

Gwynedd was an independent kingdom from the end of the Roman period until the 13th century, when it was conquered by England. The modern Gwynedd was one of eight Welsh counties created on 1 April 1974 under the Local Government Act 1972. It covered the entirety of the historic counties of Anglesey and Caernarfonshire, and all of Merionethshire apart from Edeirnion Rural District (which went to Clwyd); and also a few parishes of Denbighshire: Llanrwst, Llansanffraid Glan Conwy, Eglwysbach, Llanddoged, Llanrwst and Tir Ifan.

The county was divided into five districts: Aberconwy, Arfon, Dwyfor, Meirionnydd and Anglesey.

The Local Government (Wales) Act 1994 abolished the 1974 county (and the five districts) on 1 April 1996, and its area was divided: the Isle of Anglesey became an independent unitary authority, and Aberconwy (which included the former Denbighshire parishes) passed to the new Conwy County Borough. The remainder of the county was constituted as a principal area, with the name Caernarfonshire and Merionethshire, as it covers most of the areas of those two historic counties. As one of its first actions, the Council renamed itself Gwynedd on 2 April 1996. The present Gwynedd local government area is governed by Gwynedd Council. As a unitary authority, the modern entity no longer has any districts, but Arfon, Dwyfor and Meirionnydd remain as area committees.

The pre-1996 boundaries were retained as a preserved county for a few purposes such as the Lieutenancy. In 2003, the boundary with Clwyd was adjusted to match the modern local government boundary, so that the preserved county now covers the two local government areas of Gwynedd and Anglesey. Conwy county borough is now entirely within Clwyd.

A Gwynedd Constabulary was formed in 1950 by the merger of the Anglesey, Caernarfonshire and Merionethshire forces. A further amalgamation took place in the 1960s when Gwynedd Constabulary was merged with the Flintshire and Denbighshire county forces, retaining the name Gwynedd. In one proposal for local government reform in Wales, Gwynedd had been proposed as a name for a local authority covering all of north Wales, but the scheme as enacted divided this area between Gwynedd and Clwyd. To prevent confusion, the Gwynedd Constabulary was therefore renamed the North Wales Police.

The Snowdonia National Park was formed in 1951. After the 1974 local authority reorganisation, the park fell entirely within the boundaries of Gwynedd, and was run as a department of Gwynedd County Council. After the 1996 local government reorganisation, part of the park fell under Conwy County Borough, and the park's administration separated from the Gwynedd council. Gwynedd Council still appoints nine of the eighteen members of the Snowdonia National Park Authority; Conwy County Borough Council appoints three; and the Welsh Government appoints the remaining six.

There has been considerable inwards migration to Gwynedd, particularly from England. According to the 2021 census, 66.6% of residents had been born in Wales whilst 27.1% were born in England.

== Geography ==
Gwynedd is a mountainous county. It contains the majority of Snowdonia, or Eryri, a large upland area that stretches the length of the county from its northern coast to the River Dyfi in the south. The northern part, shared with Conwy County Borough, contains all 15 mountains in Wales with a height of over 3,000 feet (914 metres). They are part of the Snowdon, Glyderau, and Carneddau ranges and include Snowdon, or Yr Wyddfa, which at 3,560 feet (1,085 m) is Wales' highest mountain. The lower Moelwynion range and Moel Hebog and Cnicht massifs lie immediately to the south, and further south again are the Rhinogydd range, the Cadair Idris, Arenig, and Aran massifs, and the Dyfi Hills. The mountains enclose several lakes and reservoirs, and the largest lake in Wales, Llyn Tegid, lies in the east.

Snowdonia is fringed to the north west by Arfon, an undulating coastal plain separated from Anglesey by the Menai Strait. Its landscape is characterised by pastoral fields which gradually give way to the Snowdonia uplands. To the south-west lies Llŷn, a large peninsula that projects into the Irish Sea. Its northern coast is rugged, and the three peaks of Yr Eifl are prominent. A number of islands lie off the south coast, including Bardsey.

Llŷn defines the western edge of Tremadog Bay, the northern part of the larger Cardigan Bay. The bay is backed by lowlands, which in the west form a broad pastoral area. In the north-west corner the rivers Glaslyn and Dwyryd discharge into a wide, shared estuary, and beyond is a narrow coastal strip that runs south to the estuary of the Mawddach It is characterised by dune systems that soon give way to the hills of the Rhinogydd range. Further south, the area around the Dysynni and Dyfi estuaries is also lowland, separated from that to the north by the Cadair Idris massif.

== Economy ==
The county has a mixed economy. An important part of the economy is based on tourism: many visitors are attracted by the many beaches and the mountains. A significant part of the county lies within the Snowdonia National Park, which extends from the north coast down to the district of Meirionnydd in the south. But tourism provides seasonal employment and thus there is a shortage of jobs in the winter.

Agriculture is less important than in the past, especially in terms of the number of people who earn their living on the land, but it remains an important element of the economy.

The most important of the traditional industries is the slate industry, but these days only a small percentage of workers earn their living in the slate quarries.

Industries which have developed more recently include TV and sound studios: the record company Sain has its HQ in the county.

The education sector is also very important for the local economy, including Bangor University and Further Education colleges, Coleg Meirion-Dwyfor and Coleg Menai, both now part of Grŵp Llandrillo Menai.

== Transport ==
Gwynedd has several railway lines:

- Bangor lies on the North Wales Coast Line with services to Holyhead and to Manchester, London and Cardiff via Chester.
- Pwllheli is the terminus of the (single track) Cambrian line along the west coast. The smaller stations between Porthmadog and Barmouth are request stops.
- Blaenau Ffestiniog is the terminus of the (single track) Conwy Valley Line.
- Blaenau Ffestiniog is also linked to Caernarfon via Porthmadog by heritage railways: the Ffestiniog Railway and Welsh Highland Railway.
- There are also short heritage railways at Fairbourne, Llanberis, Bala, Tywyn and Snowdon, although most of these are arguably tourist attractions rather than practical transport facilities.

Roads tend to be narrow and winding due to the terrain. This often leads to congestion in the popular northern half of the National Park. Snowdon Sherpa buses cover the northern half of the National Park. Bus services are limited in the more remote parts of the county.

As for walking routes, the Snowdonia Slate Trail, Snowdonia Way, the western half of the North Wales Pilgrim's Way and 189 miles of the Wales Coastal Path lie in Gwynedd.

== Welsh speakers ==
The proportion of respondents in the 2011 census who said they could speak Welsh.

Gwynedd has the highest proportion of people in Wales who can speak Welsh. According to the 2021 census, 64.4% of the population aged three and over stated that they could speak Welsh, while 65.4% noted that they could speak Welsh in the 2011 census.

It is estimated that 83% of the county's Welsh-speakers are fluent, the highest percentage of all counties in Wales. The age group with the highest proportion of Welsh speakers in Gwynedd were those between ages 5 and 15, of whom 92.3% stated that they could speak Welsh in 2011.

The proportion of Welsh speakers in Gwynedd declined between 1991 and 2001, from 72.1% to 68.7%, even though the proportion of Welsh speakers in Wales as a whole increased during that decade to 20.5%.

The Annual Population Survey estimated that as of June 2026, 75.9% of those in Gwynedd aged three years and above could speak Welsh.

== Notable people ==
- Leslie Bonnet (1902–1985), RAF officer, writer; originated the Welsh Harlequin duck in Criccieth
- Sir Dave Brailsford (born 1964), cycling coach; grew up in Deiniolen, near Caernarfon
- Duffy (born 1984), singer, songwriter and actress; born in Bangor, Gwynedd
- Edward II of England (1284–1327), born in Caernarfon Castle
- Elin Fflur (born 1984), singer-songwriter, TV and radio presenter; went to Bangor University
- Bryn Fôn (born 1954), actor and singer-songwriter; born in Llanllyfni, Caernarfonshire.
- Wayne Hennessey (born 1987), football goalkeeper with 108 caps for Wales; born in Bangor, Gwynedd
- John Jones (c. 1530 – 1598), a Franciscan friar, Roman Catholic priest and martyr; born at Clynnog
- Sir Love Jones-Parry, 1st Baronet (1832–1891), landowner and politician, co-founder of the Y Wladfa settlement in Patagonia
- T. E. Lawrence (1888–1935), archaeologist, army officer and inspiration for Lawrence of Arabia, born in Tremadog
- David Lloyd George (1863–1945), statesman and Prime Minister; lived in Llanystumdwy from infancy
- Bertrand Russell (1872–1970), philosopher, lived at Plas Penrhyn in the village from 1956 until his death.
- Sasha (born 1969), disc jockey, born in Bangor, Gwynedd
- Sir Bryn Terfel (born 1965), bass-baritone opera and concert singer from Pant Glas
- Clough Williams-Ellis (1883–1978), architect of Portmeirion
- Owain Fôn Williams, (born 1987), footballer; born and raised in Penygroes, Gwynedd.
- Hedd Wyn (1887–1917), poet from the village of Trawsfynydd; killed in WWI
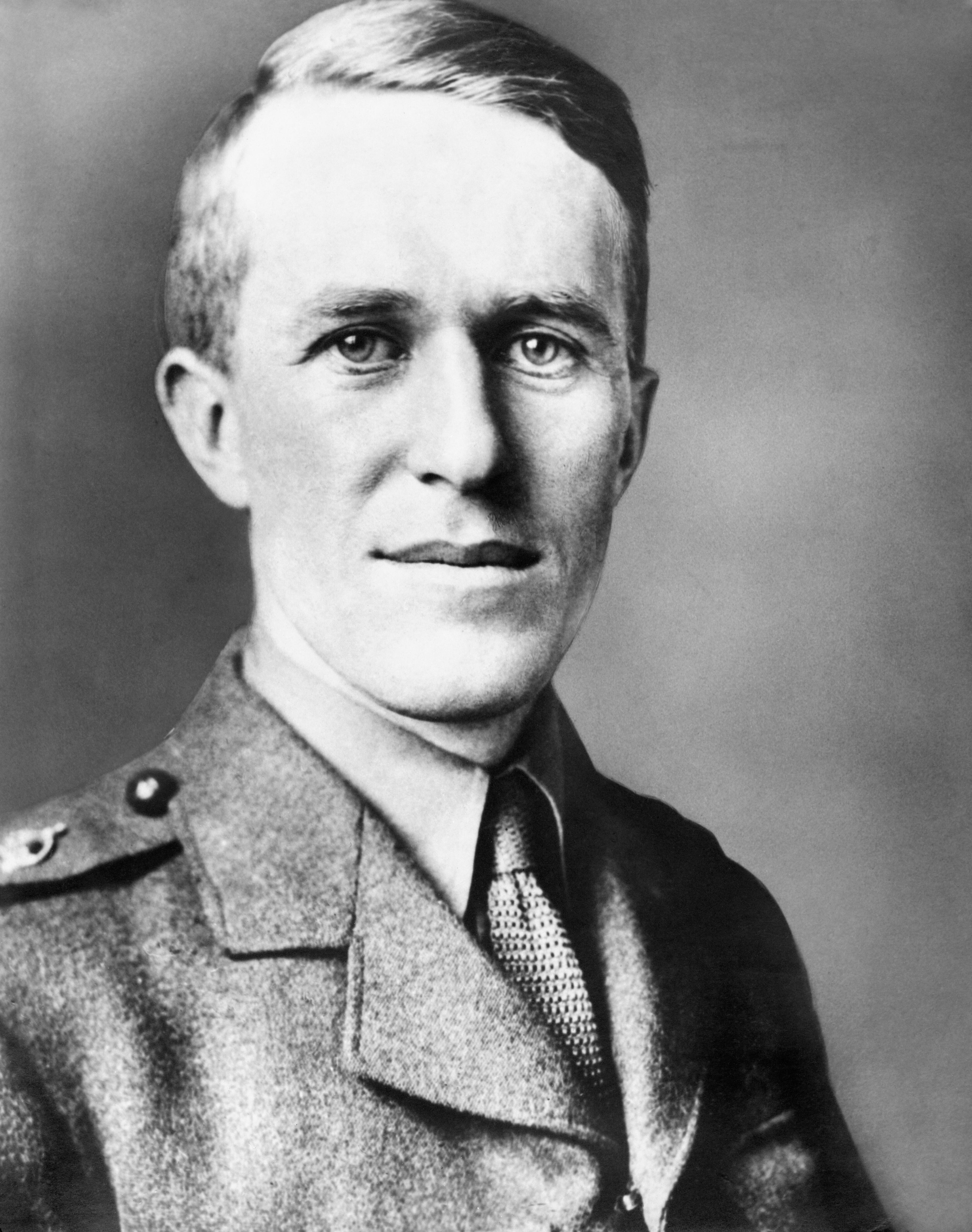
T. E. Lawrence, 1918

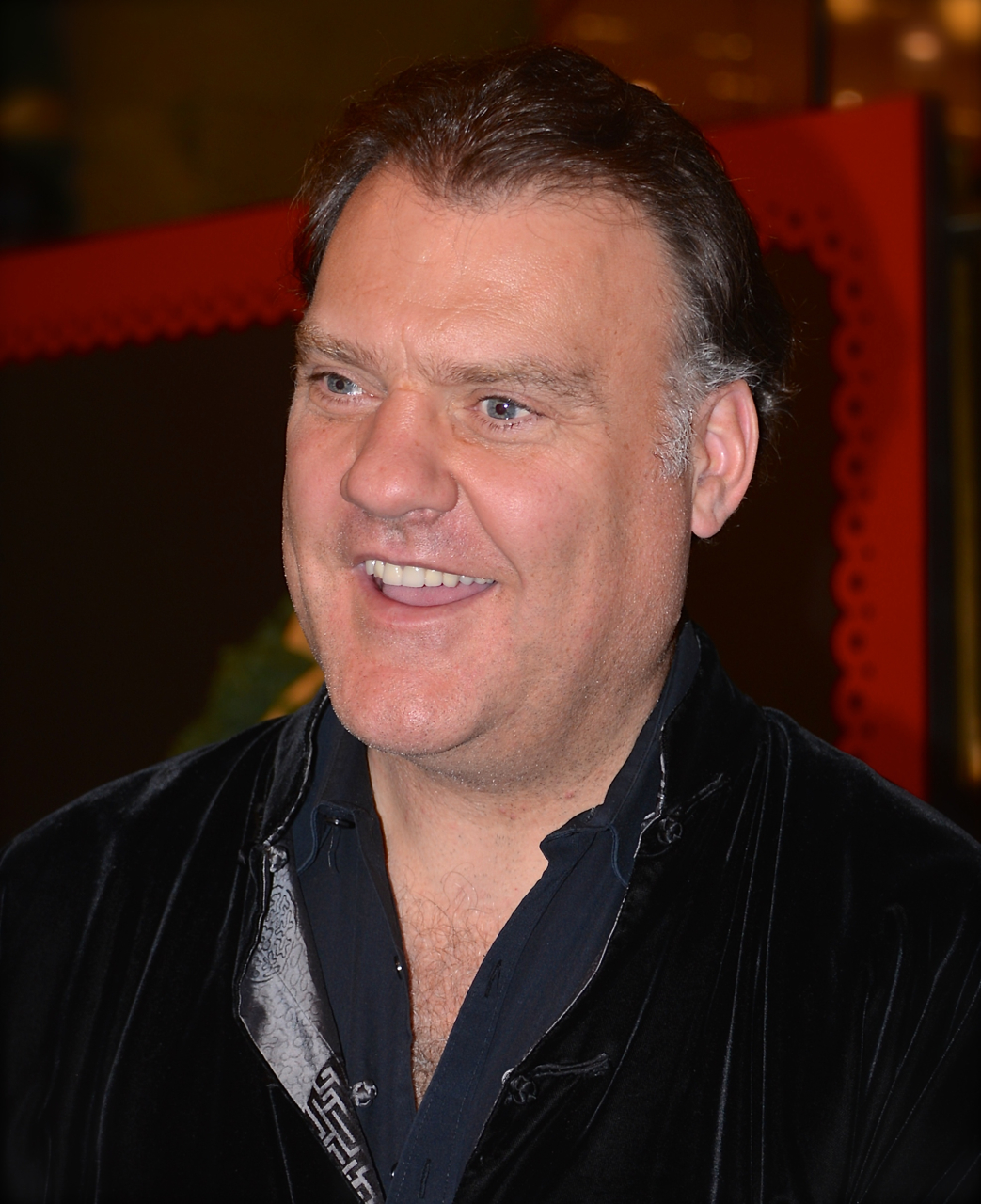
Bryn Terfel, 2013

== See also ==
- List of High Sheriffs of Gwynedd
- List of churches in Gwynedd
- List of places in Gwynedd
- List of schools in Gwynedd
- Llŷn Peninsula
- List of Lord Lieutenants of Gwynedd
- Snowdonia National Park
