= South Wales Coast and Severn Estuary Coastal Path =

Coastal long-distance footpath in south Wales

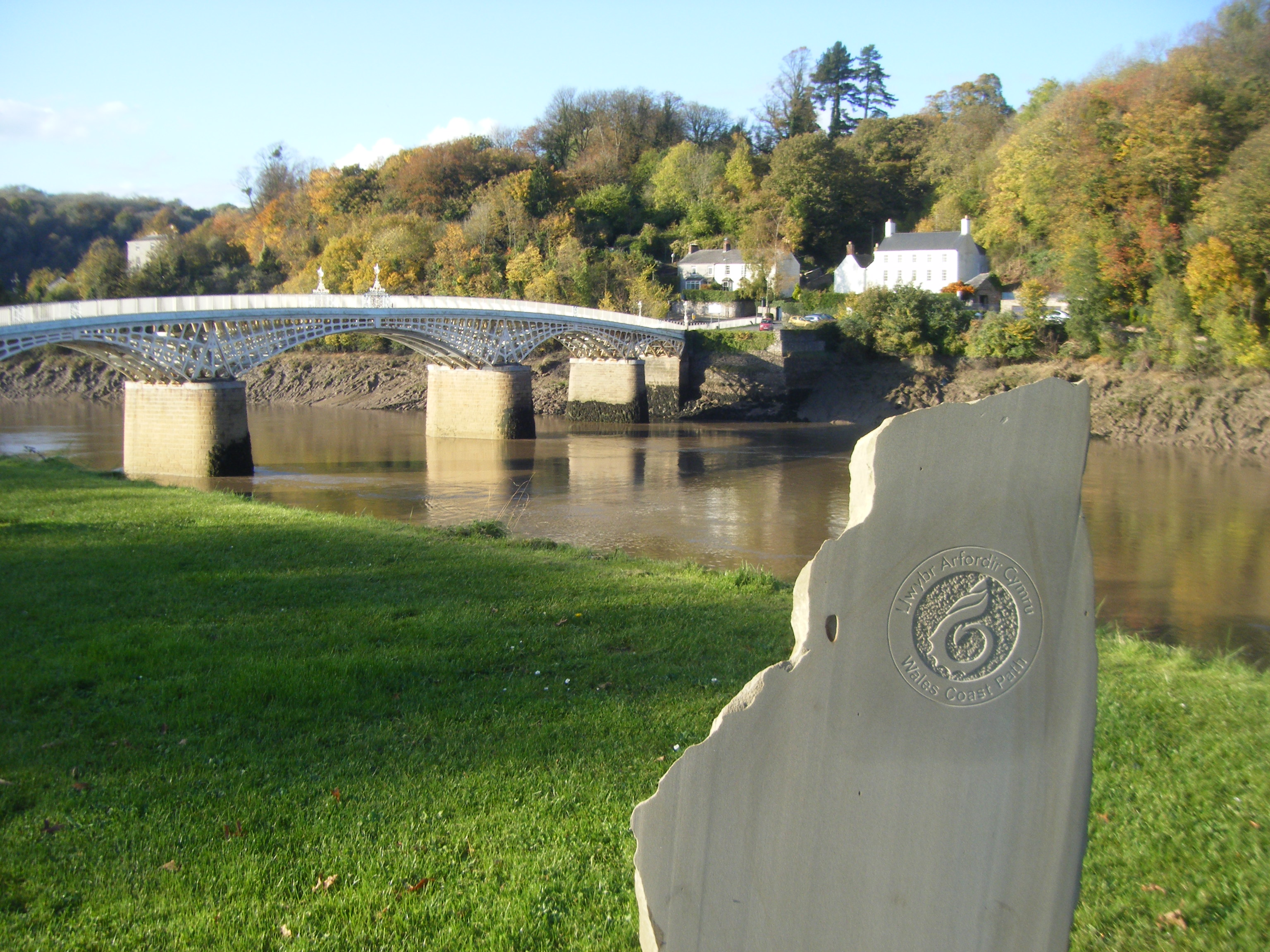
- The start of the Wales Coast Path at Chepstow
- Length: 176 km (109 mi)
- Location: Wales
- Designation: Long distance footpath
- Trailheads: Kenfig, Chepstow
- Use: Hiking
- Difficulty: Easy
- Season: All year

The South Wales Coast and Severn Estuary Coastal Path (Welsh: Llwybr arfordir De Cymru ac Aber Hafren) covers Region H of the larger Wales Coast Path, an 870-mile (1,400 km) long-distance walking route around the whole coast of Wales which opened on 5 May 2012. The South Wales Coast and Severn Estuary stretch is a 109-mile (176 km) in length running from Kenfig Dunes near Port Talbot, South Wales to Chepstow. With five local councils involved in its creation and maintenance, the route goes through a heritage coast, three national nature reserves and three heritage landscapes.

== Local councils ==
The path passes through five unitary authority areas, and each council has responsibility for establishing and maintaining the waymarked path. From west to east, it Bridgend County Borough Council, Vale of Glamorgan Council, Cardiff Council, Newport City Council and Monmouthshire County Council. As one of the sections of Welsh coastline newest to long-distance paths, the path was officially opened at the same time as the 2012 launch of the Wales Coastal Path. However a bridge planned across the River Kenfig was not yet built, and so a diversion of some 5 miles (8.0 km) was in place until the bridge was completed. The 11.5 miles (18.5 km) length of coast path through Bridgend County Borough was officially opened on 17 October 2013.

The total number of people using the Wales Coast Path (October 2011 to September 2012) in Monmouthshire, Newport, Cardiff, Vale of Glamorgan and Bridgend was over 1,429,000 as compared to 102,721 using the Pembrokeshire Coast Path.

== The route ==
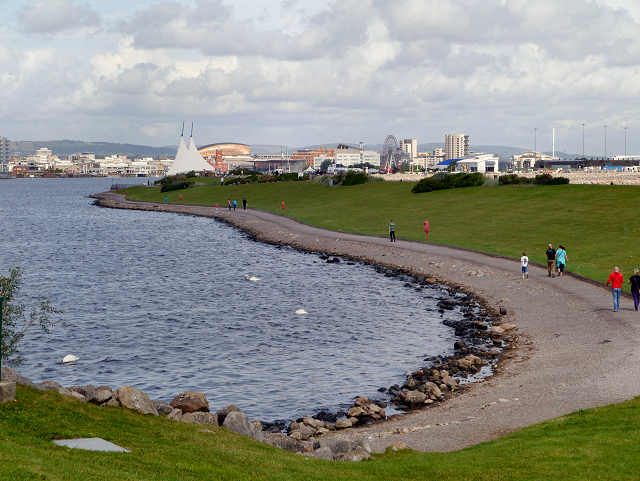
The Cardiff Bay Trail forms part of the Wales Coast Path

From the Neath Port Talbot border on the River Kenfig, the path crosses the Kenfig sands to Porthcawl and travels through the Glamorgan Heritage Coast, which gained Heritage Coast status in 1972. This leads to Barry and Penarth. The path then travels through Cardiff Bay, along the coastline to the River Usk which requires going inland along the river to the bridge at Newport and further on to Newport Wetlands National Nature Reserve (with more than 100,000 birds), on the banks of the Severn Estuary, which has the second highest tidal range in the world at 15 metres (49 feet). It ends at Chepstow where it meets the 177-mile (285 km) Offa’s Dyke Path, alongside the Anglo Welsh border, linking the Severn estuary with the Irish Sea at Prestatyn.

== Protected sites and landscapes ==
In addition to the Glamorgan Heritage Coast, the path takes in three national nature reserves: Kenfig Pool & Dunes (Bridgend), (Merthyr Mawr Warren) Bridgend, and Newport Wetlands (Newport). It also passes through three Heritage Landscapes: Merthyr Mawr and Kenfig Margam Burrows (which stretches from Neath Port Talbot through Bridgend to Vale of Glamorgan), Caldicot and Wentloog Levels (Cardiff, Newport, Monmouthshire), and Lower Wye Valley (Monmouthshire).

== See also ==
- Severn bore
- Gower and Swansea Bay Coast Path
