= Conwy Mountain =

Hill (244m) in Conwy, Wales

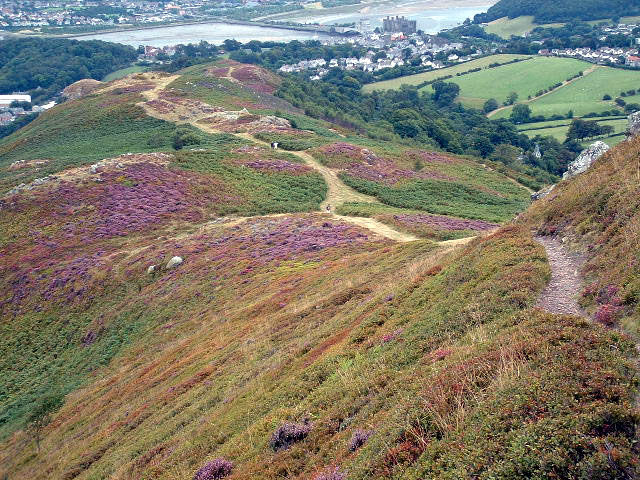
- View down Conwy Mountain, with the town of Conwy in the distance

Highest point
- Elevation: 244 m (801 ft)
- Prominence: 58 m (190 ft)
- Coordinates: 53°16′59″N 3°51′45″W

Naming
- Native name: Mynydd y Dref (Welsh)

Geography
- Location: Conwy, Wales
- Parent range: Snowdonia
- OS grid: SH759778

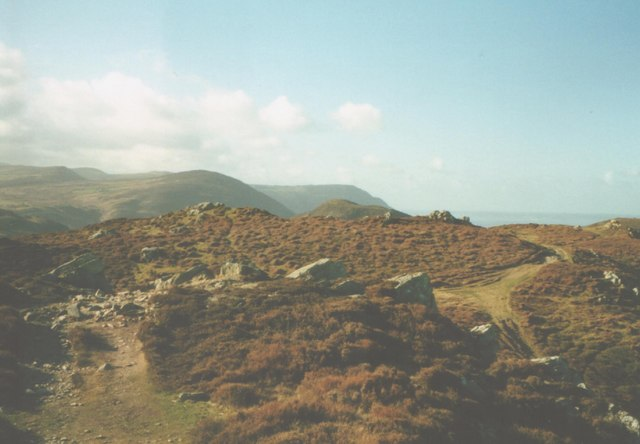
Castell Caer Seion - the Iron Age fort on Conwy Mountain.

Conwy Mountain (Welsh: Mynydd y Dref, lit. 'mountain of the town') is a hilly area to the west of the town of Conwy, in North Wales. To the north it overlooks the sea of Conwy Bay, and to the south lie the foothills of the Carneddau range of mountains, of which it forms a part. Conwy Mountain is the remains of an ancient volcano that erupted about 450 million years ago.

At the summit of Conwy Mountain are the Neolithic Hut Circles and the Iron Age hillfort of Castell Caer Seion (sometimes called Castell Caer Lleion). Castell Caer Seion comprised a stone walled fort, and remains show this to have been an extensive site, incorporated more than 50 hut circles and levelled platform houses, and with a citadel and outposts.

Limited excavations were undertaken in 1951. No datable remains were found, only slingstones, querns and stone pestles and mortars, which suggests that, unlike many hillforts in north Wales, this site was not reoccupied in the late Roman period.

Millstones were quarried on Conwy Mountain during the Napoleonic Wars.

Tracks and footpaths cross Conwy Mountain, and many walks, which can be accessed from Sychnant Pass at its western end. The route along Conwy Mountain comprises a section of the North Wales Path, a way-marked long-distance walk of some 60 miles which runs close to the North Wales coast between Prestatyn in the east and Bangor in the west.

Wild ponies and sheep roam freely on the mountain and are often encountered by visitors and hikers. With this in mind, people visiting the mountain are asked to keep dogs under close control.

Mini crags are tucked among the gentle slopes and are frequently used by youth groups for climbing practice and bouldering.

== See also ==
- List of hillforts in Wales
- Category:Hillforts in Conwy County Borough
