= Snowdonia Way =

97-mile footpath in Snowdonia, Wales

- Length: 97 mi (156 km)
- Location: Wales
- Established: 2017
- Trailheads: Machynlleth; Conwy
- Use: Hiking
- Elevation gain/loss: 16,434 ft (5,009 m)
- Highest point: 1,335 ft (407 m)
- Website: snowdoniaway.com
Trail map

The Snowdonia Way is an 97 mi (156 km) long-distance footpath in Snowdonia, Wales from Machynlleth in the south to Conwy in the north. The main route is the only long-distance low-level route through Snowdonia, avoiding the peaks in favour of valley tracks, hillside paths, and Roman roads. The mountain variant instead climbs the famous peaks of the park.
