= North Wales Path =

60-mile walk route on North Wales coast

North Wales Path

The North Wales Path (Welsh: Llwybr y Gogledd) is a long-distance walk of some 60 miles (97 km) that runs close to the coast of northern Wales between Prestatyn in the east and Bangor in the west. Parts of it overlap with the Wales Coast Path. The path runs along parts of the Clwydian Range and Dee Valley Area of Outstanding Natural Beauty (AONB). The path was devised, implemented and maintained by the then Countryside Council for Wales (merged to form Natural Resources Wales) and the three councils of: Gwynedd, Conwy, and Denbighshire.

== Route ==
The route mostly follows existing public footpaths and is waymarked with its own logo.

The route's logo

The path can easily be broken up into smaller, accessible sections, and many of these are well used. Popular sections include the Prestatyn–Dyserth Way, a former railway trackbed, the Great Orme and Little Orme at Llandudno, Mynydd y Dref (Conwy Mountain) between Conwy and Sychnant Pass, and Aber Falls.

== Interconnecting paths ==
The Wales Coast Path, an 870-mile (1,400 km) long-distance walking route around the whole coast of Wales from Chepstow to the border with Chester (in England), also covers the North Wales coast. In places, both paths take the same route, but the North Wales Path takes more detours inland while the Coast Path tends to keep as close as possible to the coast, as might be expected.

The path joins the Offa's Dyke Path at Prestatyn.

== See also ==
- Long-distance footpaths in the UK
