= Wales Coast Path =

Long-distance footpath following the coast of Wales

Wales Coast Path Llwybr Arfordir Cymru (Welsh)
- The Wales Coast Path 'dragon-shell' logo
- Length: 870 mi (1,400 km)
- Location: Wales
- Completed: 2012
- Trailheads: Chester, England border; Chepstow, Monmouthshire
- Use: Hiking
- Maintainer: Natural Resources Wales
- Website: www.walescoastpath.gov.uk

Trail map
- Location of start and finish of the Wales Coast Path

The Wales Coast Path (Welsh: Llwybr Arfordir Cymru) is a designated long-distance trail which follows, or runs close to, the coastline of Wales.

Launched in 2012, the footpath is 870 miles (1,400 km) long and was heralded as the first dedicated coast path in the world to cover the entire length of a country's coastline. The Wales Coast Path runs through eleven national nature reserves and other nature reserves such as those managed by the Royal Society for the Protection of Birds and The Wildlife Trusts.

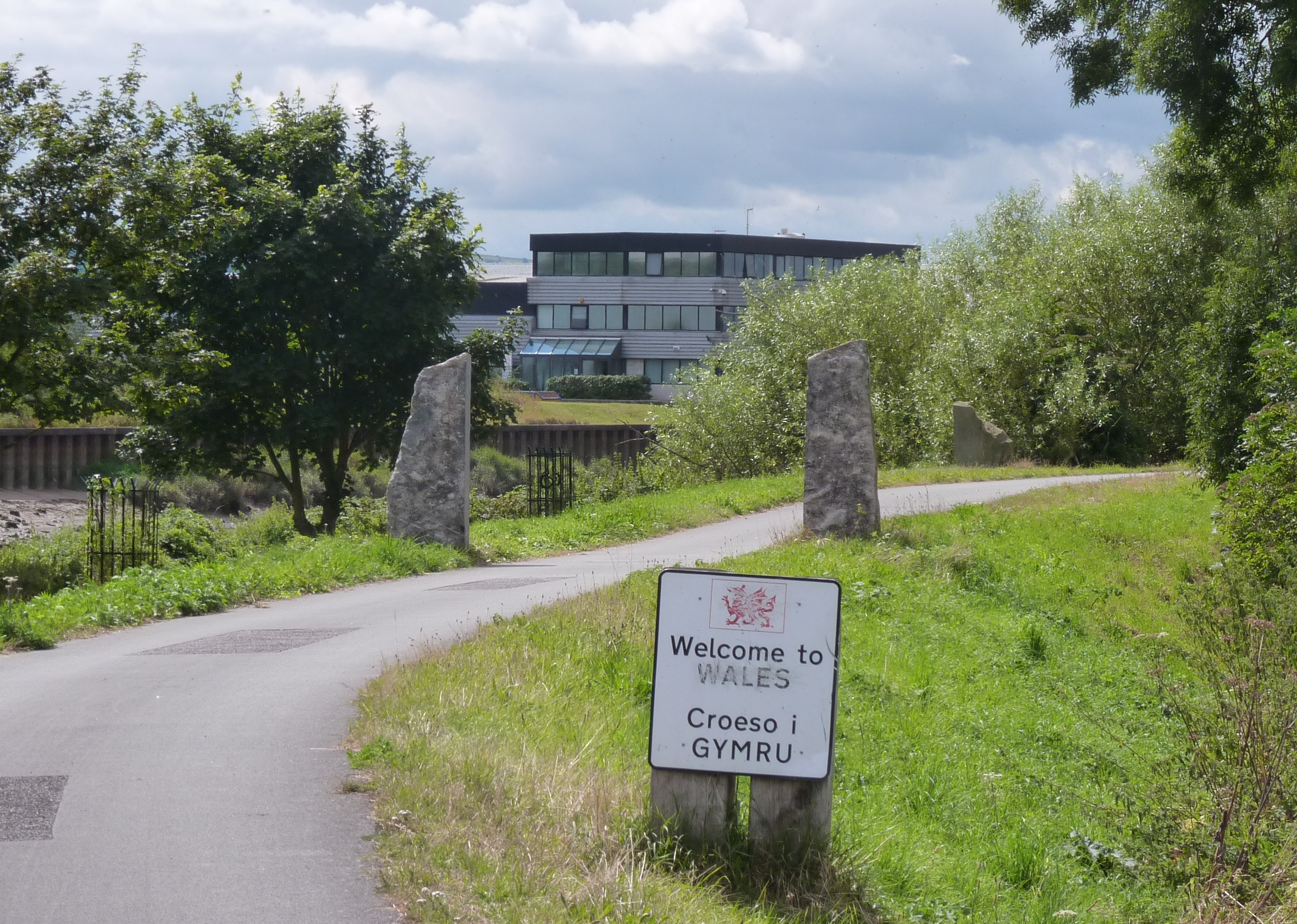
The two stone pillars alongside the River Dee on the border with England at Chester, mark the northern end of the Wales Coast Path

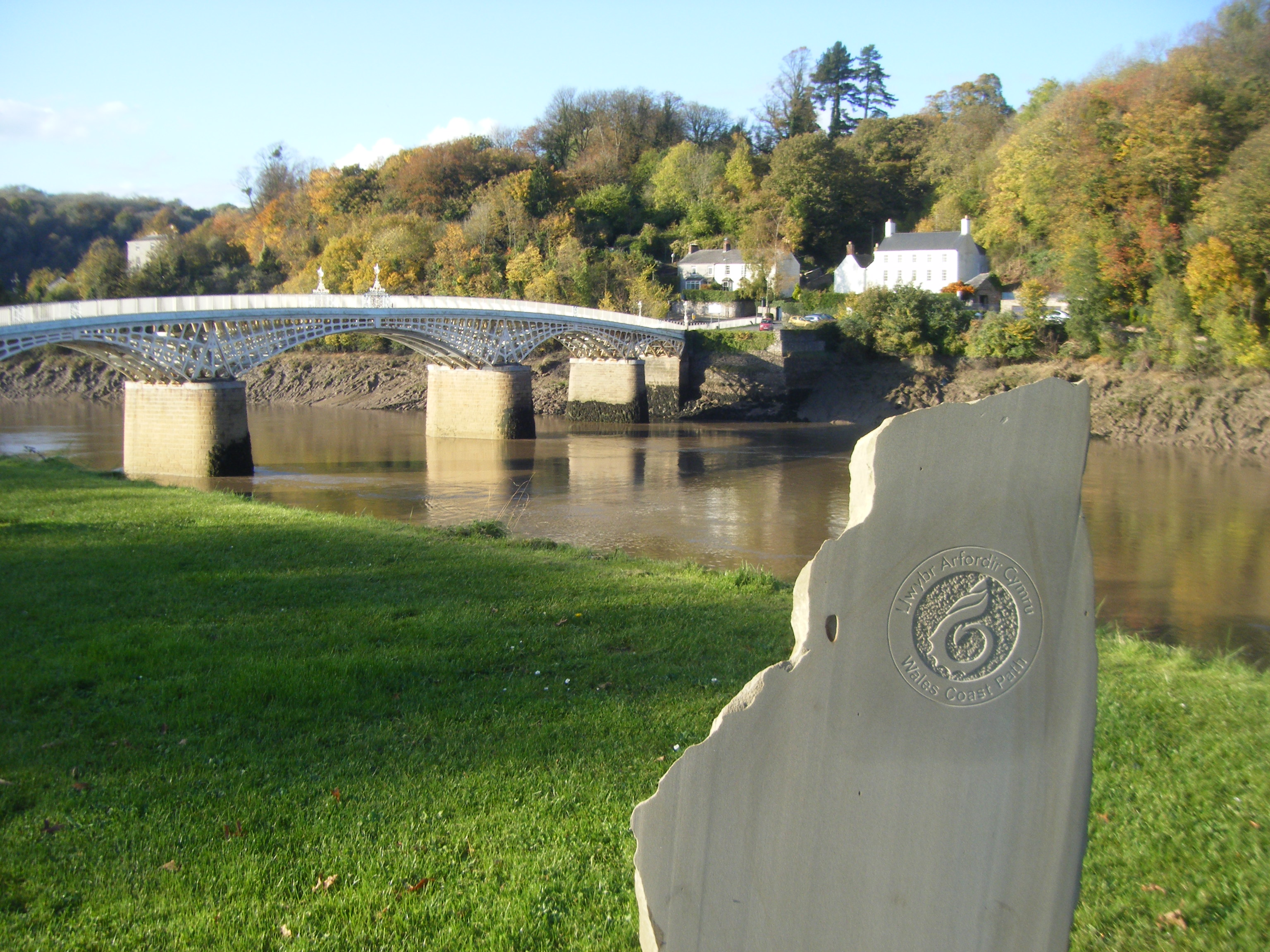
The stone at Chepstow with the path's "dragon shell" logo marks the southern end of the Wales Coast Path

== History and development ==
Plans for the new all-Wales coastal path were first unveiled by First Minister Rhodri Morgan in June 2006, when he officially opened the 125-mile (201 km) route around Anglesey. It was anticipated that the Wales Coast Path project, which would improve access and link up existing paths, would take up to five years; it took nearer six.

The idea for the path was developed from a desire to build upon the economic success of the Pembrokeshire Coast Path. Both coastal paths were considered as major contributors to the visitor economy of Wales, and in addition to financial benefits it was also seen as an important initiative in encouraging both locals and visitors to discover and enjoy outdoor spaces, and in the health and welfare benefits that such paths provide.

The Wales Coast Path was officially launched on 5 May 2012. Earlier in the same year, Lonely Planet had rated the coast of Wales first in its Best in Travel: top 10 regions for 2012.

The Wales Coast Path was developed by the Welsh Government in partnership with the former Countryside Council for Wales, sixteen local authorities, and two National Parks. The total cost of the project was £14.6 million. A book published in 2016 stated that in a single year (2013), "it had paid its startup cost twice over" because of a large increase in revenue generated by tourism. A March 2023 report indicated that the financial benefits were continuing.

Since 2007, the Welsh Government had been invested in improving public access to the coast of Wales through its Access Improvement Programme. In addition to this funding of approximately £2 million per year from the Welsh Government and the coastal local authorities, the European Regional Development Fund has additionally allocated nearly £3.9 million over three years in support of the project.

The Countryside Council for Wales supervised the project and has said that improvements to the quality and alignment of the route would continue during 2012 and 2013 to ensure that the path follows the Welsh coastline as closely as it is safe and practical. Improvements have continued since, with examples including the removal of a 10-mile detour inland following the opening of the rebuilt Gwynedd's Pont Briwet bridge in 2015 and the creation of a new right-of-way between Y Felinheli and Bangor in 2018.

Over time, the completed path is expected to lead to the creation of circular coastal routes, as links to inland towns and villages are improved.

== Description ==
Heralded as the world's first coastal path to cover an entire country, the Wales Coast Path follows the Welsh coastline from Chepstow, Monmouthshire, in the south to the Flintshire border with Chester, England, in the north. Many parts already had established paths, such as the North Wales Path, the Anglesey Coastal Path and the Llŷn Coastal Path. The Pembrokeshire Coast Path had been a designated National Trail, and in 2011 was voted by National Geographic magazine as the second-best coastal destination in the world.

The path is 870 miles (1,400 km) long and follows the coast from the mouth of the River Dee, along the northern coast of Wales with its seaside towns such as Conwy, over the Menai Strait onto the Isle of Anglesey, past Caernarfon, and then around the Llŷn Peninsula and down the sweep of Cardigan Bay past Harlech, Aberystwyth, and Cardigan, through the Pembrokeshire Coast National Park to Tenby, around the Gower Peninsula to Swansea, along the waterfront of Cardiff Bay and Cardiff, to Chepstow.

The whole path is accessible to walkers and, where practical, some sections are suitable for cyclists, families with pushchairs, people with restricted mobility, and horse riders.

The Wales Coast Path is not a National Trail although it does link with the Offa's Dyke Path, which loosely follows the Wales–England border. Together they make a 1,030-mile (1,660 km) continuous walking route around almost the whole of Wales.

Overall responsibility for establishing the path lay with the Countryside Council for Wales (now Natural Resources Wales), but management on the ground rests with the 15 local government areas it passes through. Five waymarked long-distance coast paths were already established, in Pembrokeshire, Anglesey, Gwynedd, Ceredigion and the northern coast of Wales. These formed the basis for five of the eight geographical sections that now make up the path. The remaining three areas are made up of single and combined counties and county boroughs with coastlines.

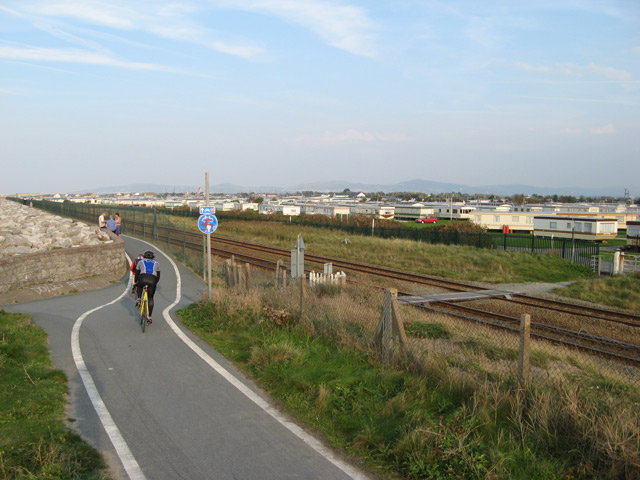
National Cycle Route 5/Wales Coast Path, Conwy

Since 2012, Wales Coast Path in North Wales follows part of the Reading to Holyhead National Cycle Route 5.

== Sections ==
The Wales Coast path website divides the 870-mile (1,400 km) coast route into sections with an accompanying map. These are (from north to south):

Section	Distance	Antecedents	Unitary authorities	Route
North Wales Coast & Dee Estuary	68 miles (109 km)	North Wales Path, opened 1997, covers parts of this section.	Flintshire: 27 miles (43 km); Denbighshire: 7 miles (11 km); Conwy: 35 miles (56 km)	North Wales Path
Isle of Anglesey Main article: Anglesey Coastal Path	132 miles (212 km)	Anglesey Coastal Path, opened 2006.	Isle of Anglesey	Anglesey Coastal Path
Menai, Llŷn & Meirionnydd Main article: Llŷn Coastal Path	189 miles (304 km)	Llŷn Coastal Path 91 miles (146 km) opened 2006 and expanded to take in the rest of Gwynedd.	Gwynedd	Llŷn Coastal Path
Ceredigion Main article: Ceredigion Coast Path	72 miles (116 km)	Ceredigion Coast Path opened 2008.	Powys: 5 miles (8.0 km); Ceredigion: 67 miles (108 km)	Ceredigion Coast Path
Pembrokeshire Main article: Pembrokeshire Coast Path	186 miles (299 km)	Pembrokeshire Coast Path is a National Trail, opened in 1970.	Pembrokeshire	Pembrokeshire Coast Path
Carmarthenshire	68 miles (109 km)	Millennium Coastal Park, 13 miles (21 km), near Llanelli, opened 2002	Carmarthenshire	Carmarthenshire
Gower & Swansea Bay Main article: Gower and Swansea Bay Coast Path	71 miles (114 km)	Gower Coast Path (informal route, 2005)	Swansea: 56 miles (90 km); Neath Port Talbot: 16 miles (26 km)	Gower and Swansea Bay
South Wales Coast & Severn Estuary Main article: South Wales Coast and Severn Estuary Coastal Path	97 miles (156 km)	Coastal parts of the Valeways Millennium Heritage Trail, opened 2001.	Bridgend: 12 miles (19 km); Vale of Glamorgan: 38 miles (61 km); Cardiff: 9 miles (14 km); Newport: 26 miles (42 km); Monmouthshire: 15 miles (24 km)	South Wales Coast and Severn Estuary

== The opening ==
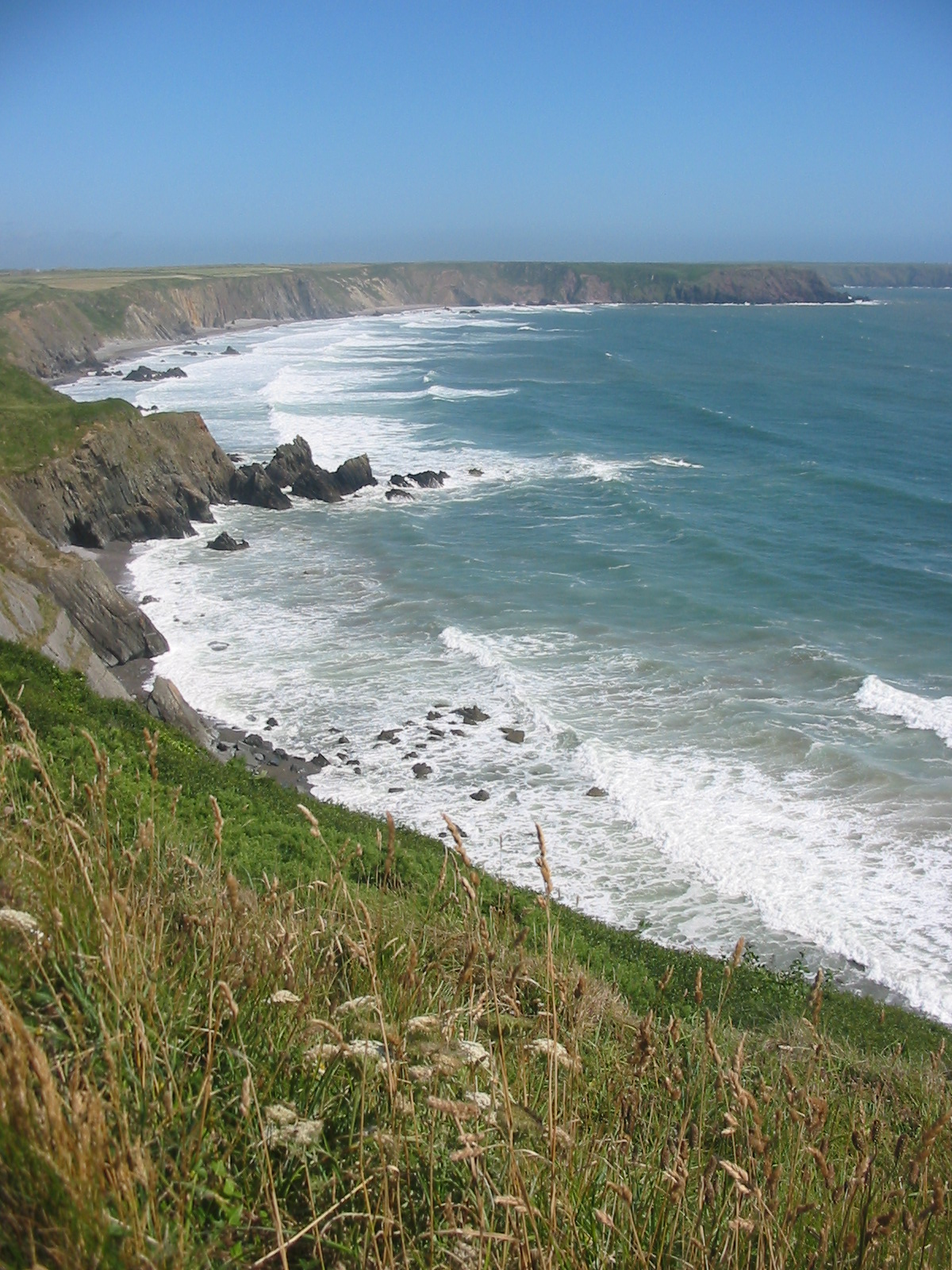
View from the Pembrokeshire Coast Path on Marloes peninsula

The official opening of the path took place in a number of locations on 5 May 2012, highlighting the path's beauty and ease of access for walkers of all ages, fitness and ability. To help celebrate the opening, Ramblers Cymru hosted the Big Welsh Coastal Walk, one of the largest mass-participation events ever seen in Wales.

The Countryside Council for Wales asked Chester-based outdoor specialists Northern Eye Books to create the official guidebooks for five of the seven main sections of the Wales Coast Path: North Wales Coast, Isle of Anglesey, Llŷn Peninsula, Carmarthenshire and Gower, and the South Wales Coast. They already published the Official Guide for Anglesey, Walking the Isle of Anglesey Coastal Path by Carl Rogers. The remaining titles were published between 2014 and 2017. There were existing guides to the Ceredigion Coast Path and the Pembrokeshire Coast Path by other publishers.

The first anniversary of the opening of the path was marked on radio and television, and it is estimated that in that first year some 2.8 million people walked stretches of the path, contributing £16 million to the Welsh economy. Further to this, it is estimated that more than 800,000 visitors to the path also stayed the night in one of the many guest-houses, B&Bs and hotels along the route.

=== Controversy ===
The Open Spaces Society has criticised some landowners who do not allow the path onto their coastal land. This means 170 miles (270 km) – more than 20% of the route – is on roads, sometimes out of sight of the sea. In response, a Countryside Council for Wales spokeswoman said: "Just over 20% of the WCP is on road, slightly less than the average for national trails in Britain, which is in the region of 25%. This is mainly on quiet, country lanes."

There is currently a temporary road route north of Cardigan, connecting Gwbert with Mwnt; the actual Ceredigion Coast Path section within that vicinity is currently unavailable because of legal proceedings.

Walkers have a view overlooking a gypsy caravan site at Rover Way in Cardiff. During the development of the footpath, the occupants expressed concerns over privacy.

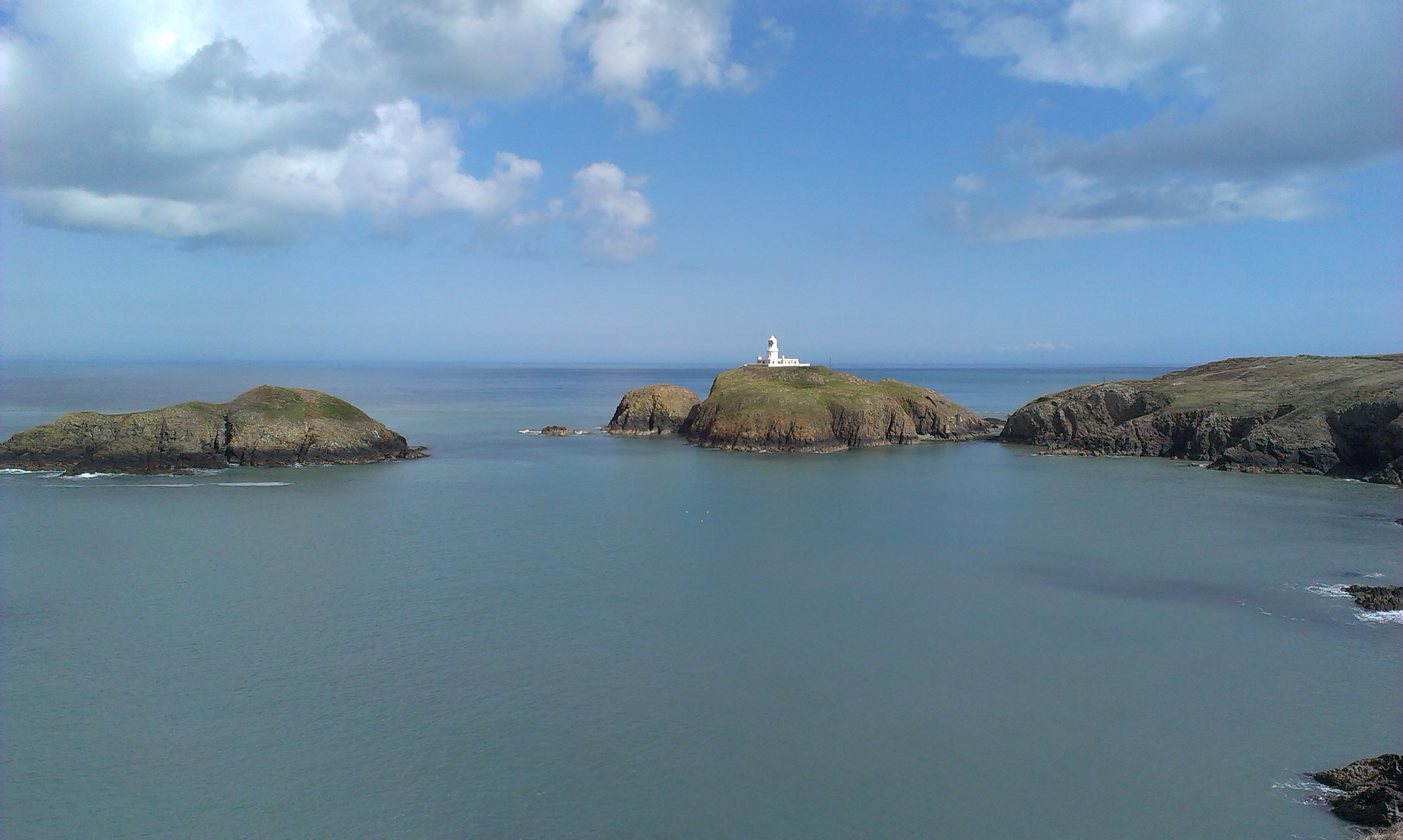
Strumble Head lighthouse, looking across Carreg Onnen Bay

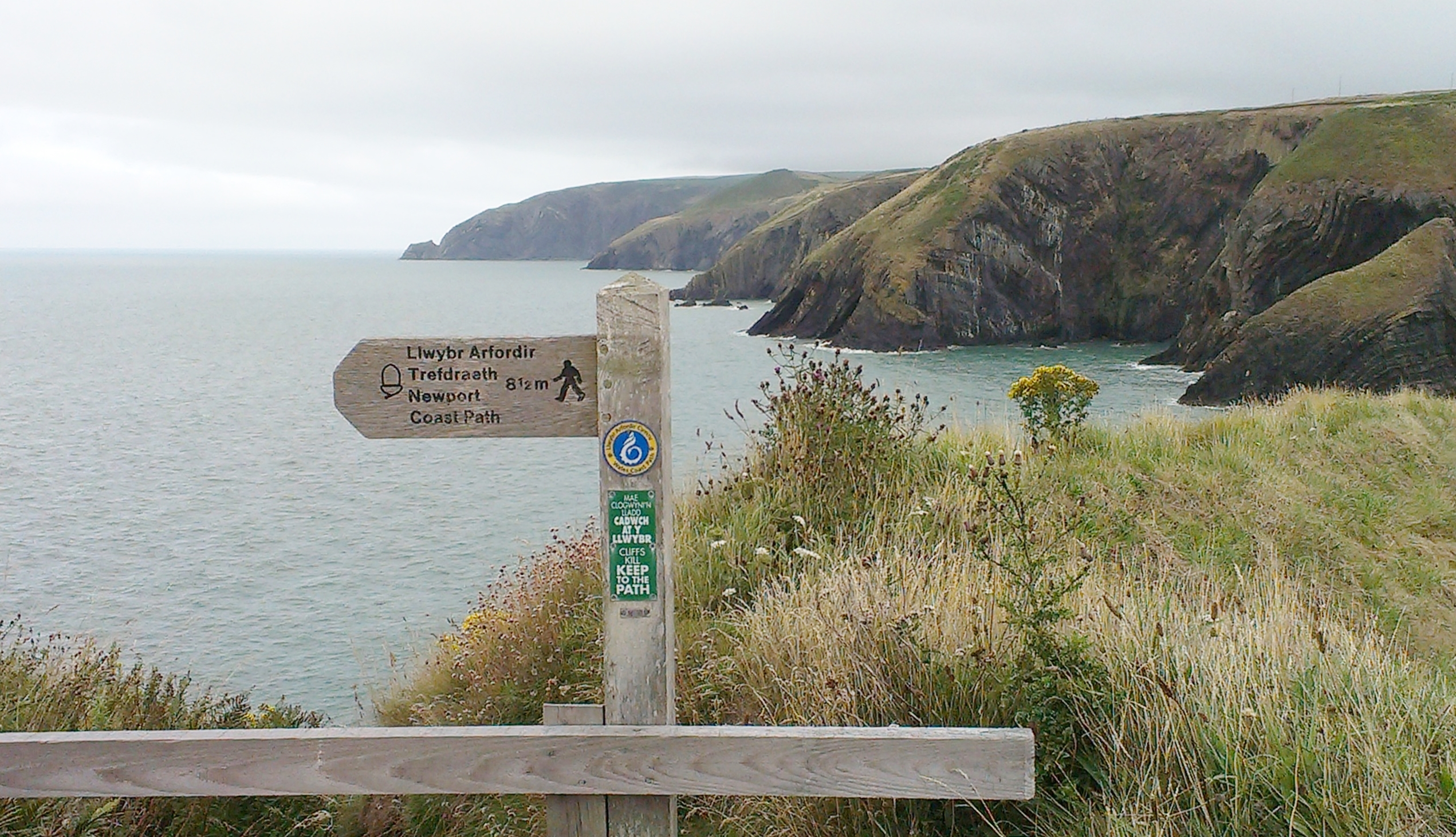
The Pembrokeshire Coast path near Ceibwr Bay, looking north towards Cemaes Head

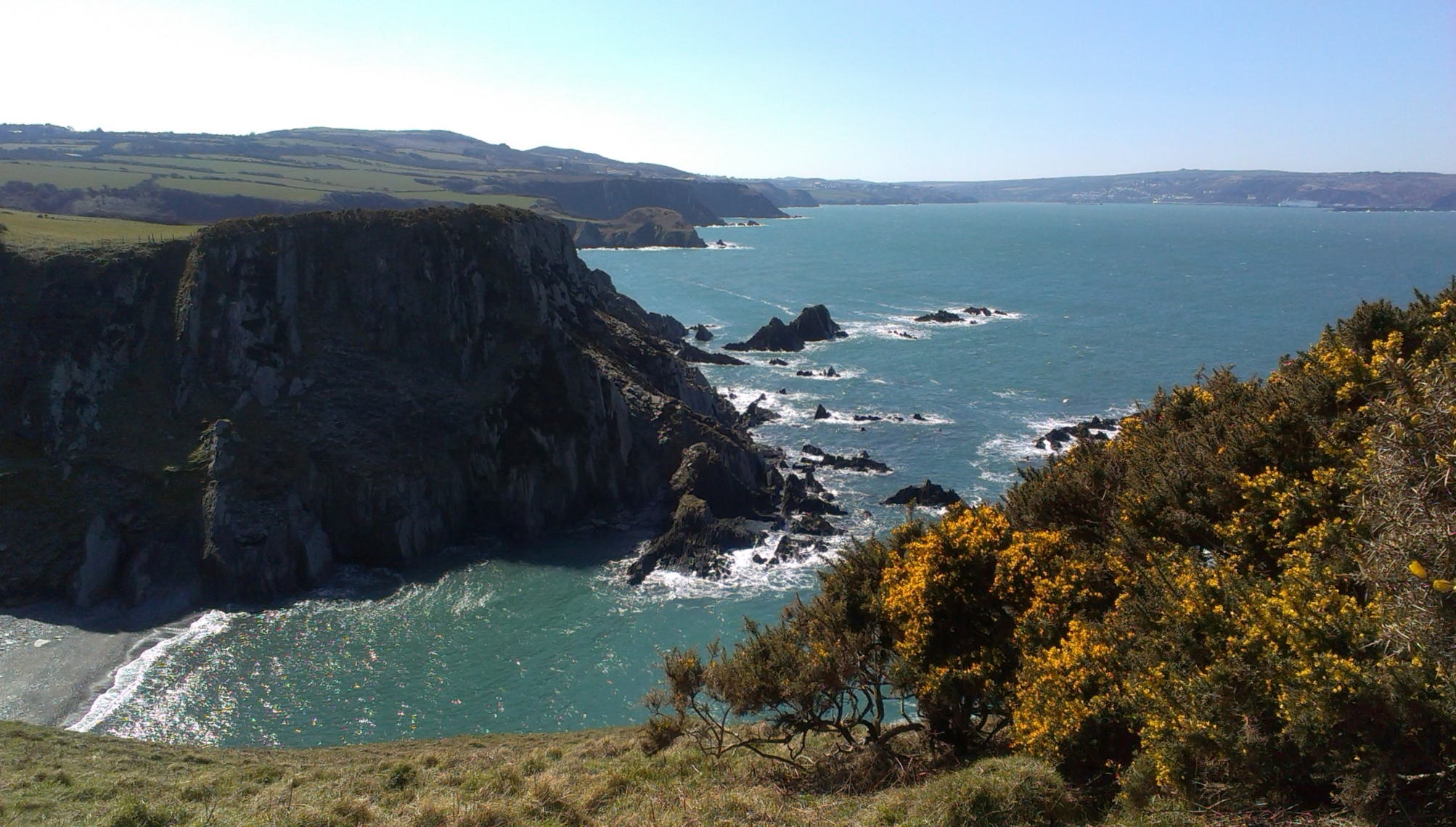
The Pembrokeshire Coast Path between Pwllgwaelod and Fishguard

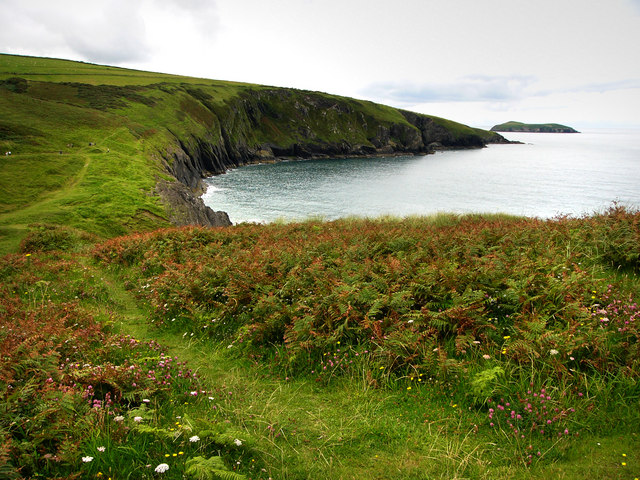
Above the beach at Mwnt

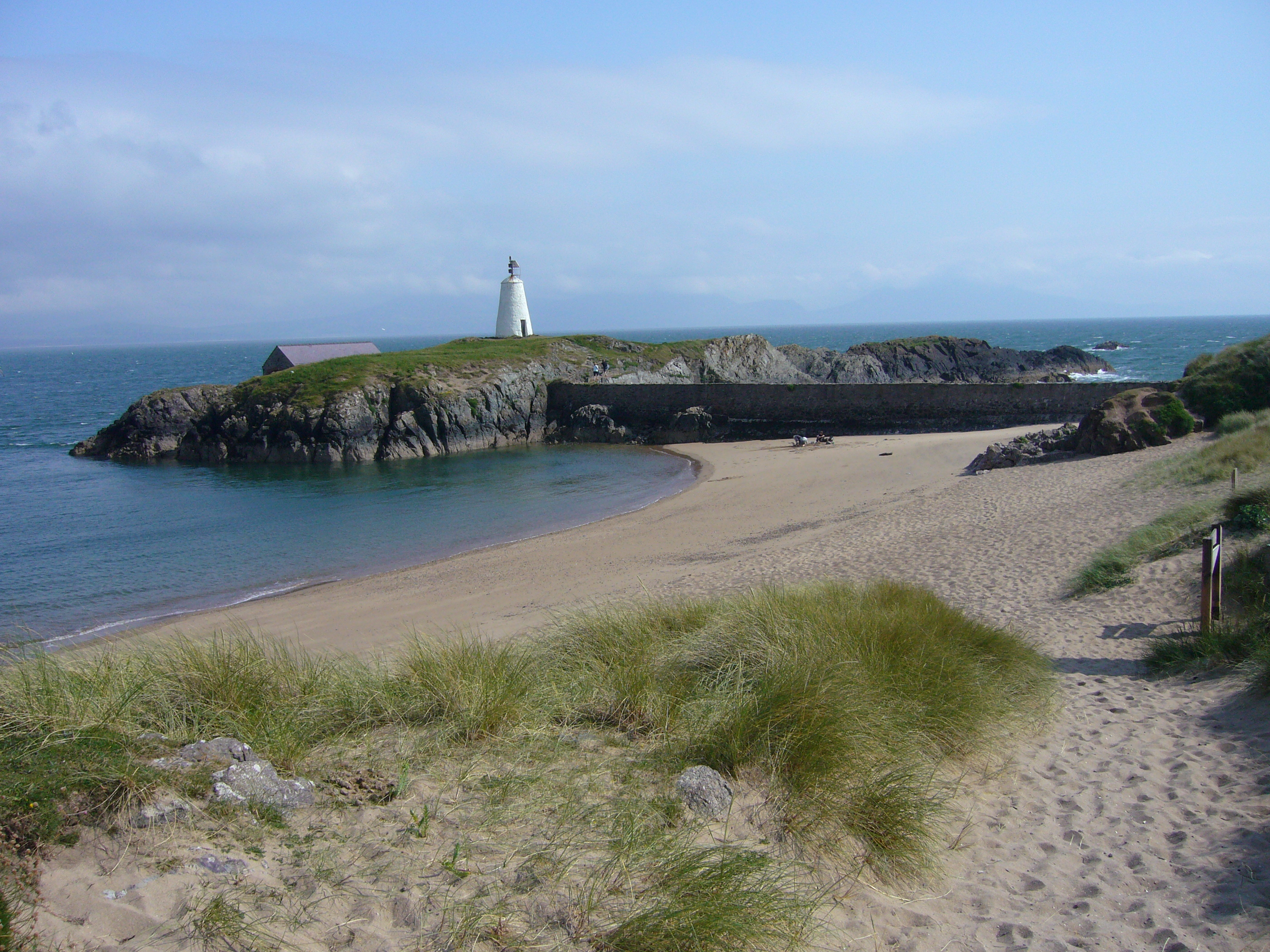
Newborough beach and Llanddwyn Island

== See also ==
- Coastline of the United Kingdom
- King Charles III England Coast Path
- List of long-distance footpaths in the United Kingdom
- List of places along Wales Coast Path
- Long-distance footpaths in Wales
- Raad ny Foillan – coastal path around the Isle of Man
- Scottish Coastal Way
- Walking in the United Kingdom
