= Grade I listed buildings in Gwynedd =

Gwynedd shown within Wales

In the United Kingdom, the term listed building refers to a building or other structure officially designated as being of special architectural, historical, or cultural significance; Grade I structures are those considered to be "buildings of exceptional interest". Listing was begun by a provision in the Town and Country Planning Act 1947. Once listed, strict limitations are imposed on the modifications allowed to a building's structure or fittings. In Wales, the authority for listing under the Planning (Listed Buildings and Conservation Areas) Act 1990 rests with Cadw.

== Buildings ==
Name	Location Grid Ref. (Note: Sometimes known as OSGB36, the grid reference is based on the British national grid reference system used by the Ordnance Survey.) Geo-coordinates	Date Listed	Function	Notes	Reference Number	Image
Cochwillan	Llanllechid; SH6069569416; 53°12′13″N 4°05′14″W	22 February 1952	House	Situated in low-lying pasture fields at end of short track off the minor road between Bethesda and Tal-y-bont.	3653	See more images
Penrhyn Castle	Llandygai; SH6026671918; 53°13′33″N 4°05′41″W	3 March 1966	Castle	Set in landscaped grounds of Penrhyn Park in elevated position surrounded by open lawns and some trees at end of long winding drive from Grand Lodge.	3659	See more images
Glynllifon	Llandwrog; SH4566255388; 53°04′24″N 4°18′19″W	29 April 1952	House	Set in its own extensive grounds on east side of the A499 at Llandwrog; the house is reached by a short drive from the grand lodge. Built on a platform site.	3684	See more images
St Beuno's Church	Clynnog; SH4145149698; 53°01′16″N 4°21′55″W	29 May 1968	Church	The church is set close to the main Caernarfon to Pwllheli road, in a large graveyard which slopes gently to the N. The chapel stands on the S side of the tower.	3758	See more images
Fort Belan	Llandwrog; SH4403660941; 53°07′22″N 4°19′56″W	29 May 1968	Fort	Situated 4km south-west of Caernarfon reached along a track to the head of the short peninsula north of Dinas and Morfa Dinlle with dock immediately to east.	3810	See more images
Caernarfon Castle	Caernarfon; SH4779662683; 53°08′22″N 4°16′37″W	31 March 1983	Castle	At the S end of the town and on the N bank of the Afon Seiont.	3814	See more images
Caernarfon town walls	Caernarfon; SH4793162532; 53°08′17″N 4°16′29″W	31 March 1983	Town walls	Enclosing the old town on the N side of Caernarfon Castle.	3815	See more images
Police Station	Caernarfon; SH4770862695; 53°08′23″N 4°16′41″W	8 October 1953	Police station	At the W end of Castle Ditch abutting the Town Wall and directly opposite Caernarfon Castle.	3827	See more images
County Court (former County Hall)	Caernarfon; SH4773162704; 53°08′23″N 4°16′40″W	8 October 1953	Courthouse	At the junction of Castle Ditch and Shirehall Street, directly opposite Caernarfon Castle.	3828	See more images
St Mary's Church	Caernarfon; SH4775562948; 53°08′31″N 4°16′39″W	8 October 1953	Church	At the N end of the street and incorporated into the Town Wall.	3857	See more images
Porth yr Aur (Royal Welsh Yacht Club)	Caernarfon; SH4771162817; 53°08′26″N 4°16′42″W	10 August 1953	Yacht club	At the W end of High Street and facing The Promenade.	3861	See more images
St Peblig's Church	Caernarfon; SH4875062290; 53°08′10″N 4°15′45″W	10 August 1953	Church	In a walled churchyard set back from the road and to the S of Segontium Roman Fort.	3881	See more images
University College of North Wales (original building)	Bangor; SH5794072337; 53°13′44″N 4°07′47″W	27 May 1949	University	Built 1907–11 by Henry T Hare and described by Cadw as architecturally one of the most significant public buildings of the period in Britain.	3963	See more images
Bangor Cathedral	Bangor; SH5807872059; 53°13′36″N 4°07′39″W	27 May 1949	Cathedral	In a sloping oval churchyard below the street.	4027	See more images
Menai Suspension Bridge	Bangor; SH5561971510; 53°13′15″N 4°09′50″W	2 August 1988	Bridge	Spanning the Menai Straits to W of the city.	4049	See more images
Vaynol Old Hall	Pentir; SH5382969536; 53°12′10″N 4°11′24″W	22 February 1952	Craft centre	Set in the heart of Vaynol Park, E of Vaynol Hall. Attached outbuildings on the W end, some facing the stable yard.	4166	See more images
Vaynol Chapel	Pentir; SH5382169561; 53°12′11″N 4°11′24″W	22 February 1952	Chapel	The building is located immediately N of the Old Hall, on a raised terrace in the SW corner of the Terraced Gardens.	4172	See more images
Vaynol Hall	Pentir; SH5369669434; 53°12′06″N 4°11′31″W	22 February 1952	Country house	Located at the centre of Vaynol Park, SW of the Old Hall, and having gardens adjoining to the SW.	4173	See more images
St Hywyn's Church	Aberdaron; SH1732526367; 52°48′14″N 4°42′41″W	19 October 1971	Church	Situated in Aberdaron village, the graveyard running to the cliff edge.	4225	See more images
St Mary's Abbey ruins	Bardsey Island, Aberdaron; SH1200822172; 52°45′52″N 4°47′16″W	19 October 1971	Abbey (ruined)	Situated towards the N end of the island in walled churchyard.	4232	See more images
St Iestyn's Church	Llaniestyn, Tudweiliog; SH2697333766; 52°52′24″N 4°34′20″W	19 October 1971	Church	Situated on the S side of the village centre at Llaniestyn.	4258	See more images
Capel Newydd	Nanhoron, Llanengan; SH2858130919; 52°50′54″N 4°32′49″W	19 October 1971	Chapel	Situated in field near Ty Bricks reached by lane and track running W from B4413 from point some 700m E of Nanhoron.	4303	See more images
St Engan's Church	Llanengan; SH2939627031; 52°48′49″N 4°31′58″W	19 October 1971	Church	Situated in Llanengan village in large churchyard just W of road to Llangian.	4304	See more images
St Cawrdaf's Church	Abererch, Llannor; SH3966136582; 52°54′10″N 4°23′07″W	19 October 1971	Church	The parish church stands in the large churchyard well furnished with slate tombstones, including some C18 ledger stones at the E, at the W end of Abererch village.	4317	See more images
Ffynnon Cybi	Llanystumdwy; SH4272241276; 52°56′45″N 4°20′32″W	19 October 1971	Well	The well lies in the narrow valley below the slopes of Garn Bentyrch, and is reached by a footpath from the NE corner of the churchyard, crossing two fields, the second by a causeway.	4343	See more images
Penarth Fawr	Llanystumdwy; SH4192737675; 52°54′47″N 4°21′08″W	19 October 1971		The house stands on a minor road running N from the A497, W of Pwllheli towards Llanarmon.	4359	See more images
St Beuno's Church	Pistyll; SH3283342320; 52°57′08″N 4°29′23″W	19 October 1971	Church	The church is set on a sloping site in a narrow valley below the later hamlet of Pistyll, and below the former road line of the Llithfaen to Nefyn road.	4374	See more images
St Gwynhoydl's Church	Llangwnnadl; SH2088533236; 52°52′00″N 4°39′45″W	19 October 1971	Church	Situated some 500m E of the crossroads at Pen-y-graig, NE of a minor road from the crossroads to Pont Llangwnnadl.	4378	See more images
Criccieth Castle	Criccieth; SH4998837731; 52°54′58″N 4°13′57″W	2 August 1949	Castle	Founded as a royal residence by the princes of Gwynedd. Taken by Edward I in 1283 and slighted by Owain Glyndŵr in 1403.	4396	See more images
Capel Peniel	Porthmadog; SH5625939895; 52°56′14″N 4°08′25″W	30 March 1951	Chapel	Set back from the road at the S end of Tremadog.	4442	See more images
St Cadfan's Church	Tywyn; SH5882200952; 52°35′17″N 4°05′07″W	30 March 1951	Church	Near the E end of the modern town, in a walled churchyard on the W side of Corbet Square.	4642	See more images
St Derfel's Church	Llandderfel; SH9815737066; 52°55′17″N 3°30′58″W	20 October 1966	Church	Located within its own walled churchyard at the SW edge of the village, with commanding views down the Dee valley.	4654	See more images
St Mary and St Egryn's Church	Llanegryn; SH5961805787; 52°37′54″N 4°04′33″W	17 June 1966	Church	The church is located on a S facing bluff above the confluence of two streams, NNW of the present nucleated village, and is reached by a minor road off the N end of the main village street.	4729	See more images
Cymer Abbey	Llanelltyd; SH7213419517; 52°45′29″N 3°53′46″W	17 June 1966	Abbey	Situated near the Afon Mawddach on the opposite bank of the river to Llanelltyd village; accessed via a lane leading NE off the main road.	4738	See more images
St Celynnin's Church	Llangelynnin; SH5712307205; 52°38′37″N 4°06′47″W	17 June 1966	Church	To the W of and below the A493 in Llangelynnin hamlet. The church stands in a rectangular churchyard, and is set into the steeply sloping ground above the railway and sea.	4751	See more images
Town Hall	Portmeirion, Penrhyndeudraeth; SH5891037133; 52°54′47″N 4°05′59″W	28 April 1952	Town hall	Facing the Angel and Angel Gates at the western edge of the village group; set against the hill slope.	4777	See more images
St Tanwg's Church	Llanfair; SH5687328241; 52°49′57″N 4°07′34″W	30 November 1966	Church	Located at the coast to SSW end of the village of Llandanwg.	4790	See more images
St Brothen's Church	Llanfrothen; SH6221941185; 52°57′01″N 4°03′08″W	30 November 1966	Church	Located on a sloping site at the SW edge of the small village of Llanfrothen; accessed via a footpath leading S from a lane running S to the Village from the B4410 Garreg to Rhyd road; set within a rubble-walled graveyard.	4804	See more images
St Mary and St Bodfan's Church	Llanaber, Barmouth; SH5993018024; 52°44′30″N 4°04′35″W	3 April 1951	Church	On a striking site overlooking the sea to the W of the slightly elevated main road; in a large graveyard behind rubble walls, accessed via a stone gabled lychgate.	4906	See more images
St Mark's Church	Brithdir and Llanfachreth; SH7635718360; 52°44′55″N 3°50′00″W	26 May 1995	Church	Begun 1895 and consecrated in 1898; designed by H Wilson, a leading figure of the Arts and Crafts movement.	16008	See more images
Capel Jerusalem	Bethesda; SH6245566745; 53°10′48″N 4°03′35″W	25 April 1997	Chapel	Situated in centre of Bethesda, fronting onto the gardens behind the War Memorial.	18387	See more images
St Baglan's Church	Bontnewydd; SH4554460690; 53°07′15″N 4°18′34″W	29 May 1968	Church	Situated NW of Llanfaglan, in an isolated situation in a field some 150m E of the minor road which runs N – S along the edge of the Afon Gwyrfai estuary.	18619	See more images
Dolbadarn Castle	Llanberis; SH5860359791; 53°06′59″N 4°06′51″W	28 May 1999	Castle	Situated on a natural rock outcrop in a strategic position at the north-west end of Llyn Peris, the castle forms a prominent feature in the landscape.	21854	See more images
Gilfach Ddu (housing the National Slate Museum)	Llanddeiniolen; SH5855060280; 53°07′15″N 4°06′55″W	4 November 1999	Quarry workshops	Located at the south-east end of Llyn Padarn to the east of Llanberis, the quarry workshops sit at the foot of the vast workings of the former Dinorwic Slate Quarry.	22656	See more images
Harlech Castle	Harlech; SH5811031240; 52°51′36″N 4°06′32″W	21 June 2001	Castle	Imposingly sited in the centre of the town with dramatic views across Tremadog Bay and towards Snowdonia.	25500	See more images

== See also ==
- Grade II* listed buildings in Gwynedd
- Listed buildings in Wales
- Scheduled monuments in Gwynedd
- Registered historic parks and gardens in Gwynedd
