= Grade II* listed buildings in Gwynedd =

Gwynedd shown within Wales

In the United Kingdom, the term listed building refers to a building or other structure officially designated as being of special architectural, historical, or cultural significance; Grade II* structures are those considered to be "particularly important buildings of more than special interest". Listing was begun by a provision in the Town and Country Planning Act 1947. Once listed, strict limitations are imposed on the modifications allowed to a building's structure or fittings. In Wales, the authority for listing under the Planning (Listed Buildings and Conservation Areas) Act 1990 rests with Cadw.

== Buildings ==
Name	Location Grid Ref. (Note: Sometimes known as OSGB36, the grid reference is based on the British national grid reference system used by the Ordnance Survey.) Geo-coordinates	Date Listed	Function	Notes	Reference Number	Image
Pen-y-bryn	Aber; SH6582472739; 53°14′05″N 4°00′42″W	22 February 1952	Manor house	Situated on rising ground above the A55 on the north-east side of the Afon Aber to the east of the village.	3651	See more images
Gatehouse/Barn at Pen-y-bryn	Aber; SH6584172795; 53°14′07″N 4°00′42″W	3 March 1966	Gateway	Located to north-east of Pen-y-bryn, from which it is separated by a stone wall/hedge; grassed over cobbled surfaces immediately adjoining on east side.	3656	Upload Photo
Church of St Tegai	Llandygai; SH6007670987; 53°13′03″N 4°05′49″W	3 March 1966	Church	Located at north-eastern end of village.	3657	See more images
Penrhyn Castle Grand Lodge	Llandygai; SH5978870979; 53°13′02″N 4°06′05″W	3 March 1966	Gatehouse	Situated at the main entrance to Penrhyn Castle with forecourt and green to south; incorporated in park wall which runs to east and briefly to west before turning north-west towards Bangor; 2 large Douglas fir trees sit in the lawned forecourt.	3661	Penrhyn Castle Grand Lodge
Lon-Isaf Gate	Llandygai; SH6018869380; 53°12′11″N 4°05′41″W	3 March 1966	Gate	Located on its own on west side of former London to Holyhead Road, which is now by-passed by the present A5 and serves as a minor gated road between the A5 and Llandygai; cottage has low rubblestone boundary wall with stone-on-edge coping.	3665	Upload Photo
Hafod Lwyfog	Beddgelert; SH6525952235; 53°03′01″N 4°00′42″W	29 April 1952		Located on the SE side of the Gwynant valley near the upper (NE) end of Llyn Gwynant, and accessed from the road via a short track; set behind low rubble forecourt walls with slate-flagging in front and a steep slope to the rear.	3675	Upload Photo
Plas Newydd	Llandwrog; SH4499554439; 53°03′53″N 4°18′53″W	29 April 1952		Situated in sheltered parkland position near the Afon Llifon, the house is moated on 3 sides with a stone bridge on the north-west side; surrounding garden with stone walls, that on south-east side a retaining wall with a well to south-west corner.	3683	Upload Photo
Plas Glan-yr-Afon	Waunfawr; SH5040759830; 53°06′53″N 4°14′12″W	29 April 1952		Located on the north side of a long, rough track running south-eastwards towards Waenfawr from the road between Bontnewydd and Caeathro; the house is separated from its farmbuildings by a rubblestone wall with stone-on-edge coping.	3688	Plas Glan-yr-Afon
St Mary's Church	Beddgelert; SH5909248036; 53°00′40″N 4°06′06″W	14 December 1961	Church	Located in the village centre at the end of the lane and set within its own walled churchyard.	3689	See more images
Berth-Lwyd	Beddgelert; SH6280948050; 53°00′44″N 4°02′47″W	29 May 1968		Located on the northern slopes of the Nantmor valley, some 3km NE of Nantmor; accessed via an unmetalled track leading W off the unclassified road running SW from Nantgwynant.	3741	Upload Photo
Capel Anwes	Beddgelert; SH6104646201; 52°59′42″N 4°04′19″W	29 May 1968		Located high up on the W slopes of the Nanmor valley, above the Dolfriog woods, approximately 2km E of Nantmor village; located in a field and accessed via a lane leading NE off the unclassified road from Nanmor to Bethania.	3752	Upload Photo
Ffynnon Beuno	Clynnog; SH4132249453; 53°01′08″N 4°22′01″W	29 May 1968	Well	The well stands at the SW end of the village, close to the main road, and reached by a short path from the main road to Llanaelhaearn.	3759	See more images
Church of St Peris	Llanberis; SH6065658291; 53°06′13″N 4°04′58″W	29 May 1968	Church	Located in the centre of Nant Peris at the western end of the Pass of Llanberis in a roughly rectangular-shaped churchyard with a stone lychgate dated 1929 on the northern side.	3769	See more images
Glynllifon Grand Lodge including archway at main entrance	Llandwrog; SH4522655370; 53°04′23″N 4°18′42″W	29 April 1952	Lodge/Gateway	At the main entrance to Glynllifon, set back from the A499 and set into the impressive boundary wall that suurounds this park.	20478	Glynllifon Grand Lodge including archway at main entrance
Glynllifon Stable Courtyard	Llandwrog; SH4556255359; 53°04′23″N 4°18′24″W	29 April 1952		Situated to the west of the house.	20447	Upload Photo
Fort Williamsburg Tower	Llandwrog; SH4599855099; 53°04′15″N 4°18′00″W	29 May 1968	Tower	Situated approximately 0.5km south-east of the house and reached by the south drive. The tower is the focal building within the Fort and is built on a mound near its north-west corner, between inner and outer bastions and reached via a tunnel.	3791	Fort Williamsburg Tower
Fort Williamsburg Barracks	Llandwrog; SH4608055054; 53°04′14″N 4°17′56″W	29 May 1968	Barracks	At the south-east corner of Fort Williamsburg which is situated approximately 0.5km south-east of the house	20470	Upload Photo
Fort Williamsburg Magazine	Llandwrog; SH4599255102; 53°04′15″N 4°18′01″W	29 May 1968		Situated immediately beside the Tower near the north-west corner of Fort Williamsburg, approximately 0.5km south-east of the house. Reached via a tunnel passage from the Parade Ground.	20465	Upload Photo
Fort Williamsburg Tunnel Passage	Llandwrog; SH4601855099; 53°04′15″N 4°17′59″W	29 May 1968		On the northern side of the Fort linking the former Parade Ground and the Tower and beyond to the outer bastions. Fort Williamsburg is approximately 0.5km south-east of the house.	20466	Upload Photo
Fort Williamsburg Outer Defensive Wall	Llandwrog; SH4607155020; 53°04′13″N 4°17′56″W	29 May 1968	Wall	Forming a perimeter to the fort which is approximately 0.5km south-east of the house and reached by the south drive.	20467	Upload Photo
Fort Williamsburg Gatehouse	Llandwrog; SH4604455112; 53°04′16″N 4°17′58″W	29 May 1968	Gatehouse	Built into the bank on the north side of the fort accessed from the main north entrance via a footbridge across the ditch; faces into the former parade ground. Fort Williamsburg is approximately 0.5km south-east of the house.	20468	Upload Photo
Fort Williamsburg Armoury including attached screen walls	Llandwrog; SH4606755061; 53°04′14″N 4°17′57″W	29 May 1968	Armoury	Facing into the former parade ground and backing onto the Barracks at the south-east corner of Fort Williamsburg which is situated approximately 0.5km south-east of the house.	20469	Upload Photo
Church of St Rhedyw	Llanllyfni; SH4707052103; 53°02′39″N 4°16′58″W	29 May 1968	Church	Prominently sited on a corner on Ffordd Rhedyw within a raised rubble-walled churchyard on sloping ground down towards the Afon Lyfni.	3799	See more images
Church of St Michael	Llanrug; SH5269263081; 53°08′40″N 4°12′14″W	29 May 1968	Church	Situated on its own in originally rectangular churchyard, now extended to north-east and south-east, on track between Bryn-llan and Plas Tirion approximately 0.75km south-west of Llanrug.	3802	See more images
Bryn Bras Castle	Llanrug; SH5434762579; 53°08′25″N 4°10′44″W	29 May 1968	Country house	The house occupies a triangular site at the junction of the road between Cwm-y-glo and Llanrug and the mountain route from Llanrug to Llanberis; the drive and parking area on the north represent the line of the old Cwm-y-glo to Llanrug road.	3804	See more images
Wern	Waunfawr; SH5036161169; 53°07′36″N 4°14′16″W	29 May 1968		Situated at the end of a drive-way off the south-east side of the road by-passing Caeathro between Pont-rug and Bontnewydd; low rubblestone wall to front of main range with square piers and iron gate aligned on entrance.	3812	Upload Photo
Capel Pendref	Caernarfon; SH4801962948; 53°08′31″N 4°16′25″W	31 March 1983	Chapel	An isolated building on the N side of the junction with Pavilion Road.	3822	See more images
Tanybont Arch, including former lock-up to SE	Caernarfon; SH4790962823; 53°08′27″N 4°16′31″W	8 October 1953		To the E of the East Gate of the Town Wall.	3823	Tanybont Arch, including former lock-up to SE
Palace Vaults	Caernarfon; SH4784462723; 53°08′24″N 4°16′34″W	8 October 1953	Inn	Directly opposite Caernarfon Castle and on the corner of the junction of Castle Ditch with Palace Street.	3832	See more images
East Gate, incorporating 3 Hole-in-the-Wall Street	Caernarfon; SH4790162823; 53°08′27″N 4°16′31″W	31 March 1983	Town gate	The E end of High Street.	3869	See more images
Tŷ Sidan	Caernarfon; SH4778762809; 53°08′26″N 4°16′37″W	29 May 1968		In a row of frontages near the W end of the street.	3873	Tŷ Sidan
Castle House	Caernarfon; SH4779362811; 53°08′26″N 4°16′37″W	8 October 1953		At the junction of High Street and Castle Street.	3874	Castle House
38–40 High Street	Caernarfon; SH4788362809; 53°08′26″N 4°16′32″W	10 August 1953	Shop	In a row of frontages near the E end of the street.	3878	38–40 High Street
Days Gone By Antiques	Caernarfon; SH4785062780; 53°08′25″N 4°16′34″W	31 March 1983		In a row of frontages midway along the street.	3909	Days Gone By Antiques
Llys Llywelyn	Caernarfon; SH4784762747; 53°08′24″N 4°16′34″W	8 October 1953	House	In a row of frontages near the S end of the street.	3912	See more images
Caernarfon Harbour Trust Offices	Caernarfon; SH4790762608; 53°08′20″N 4°16′31″W	8 October 1953	Offices	On Slate Quay to the SE of and facing the castle.	3932	See more images
Bangor Pier, Garth Road	Bangor; SH5841573254; 53°14′15″N 4°07′23″W	31 October 1974	Pier		3987	See more images
Terraced Walls at, and Gated Entrance to, the University College of North Wales Main Building, Penrall	Bangor; SH5790972272; 53°13′42″N 4°07′48″W	8 February 1988	Walls/Gate		4092	Terraced Walls at, and Gated Entrance to, the University College of North Wales Main Building, Penrall
Plas Penisarnant	Llanllechid; SH6307965070; 53°09′54″N 4°02′58″W	24 September 1985		At the foot of Nant Ffrancon, between the A5 and the river Ogwen, in wooded grounds.	4139	Upload Photo
Former Hospital and boundary walls	Llanddeiniolen; SH5832760707; 53°07′29″N 4°07′07″W	2 July 1989	Former quarry hospital	Situated on level site above the north-east side of Llyn Padarn with spectacular mountain views; lies to north-west of the slate museum from which it is reached by a long drive; also approached over C20 bridge by foot up the steep hillside.	4151	See more images
Western Slab Mill at Felin Fawr Slate Works	Llandygai; SH6148166361; 53°10′35″N 4°04′26″W	4 November 1990	Slab Mill	Situated on the western side of the Felin Fawr Slate Works, which adjoin the former Penrhyn Quarry Railway and the west bank of the Afon Galedffrwd.	4153	Upload Photo
Water Wheel House between slab mills at Felin Fawr Slate Works	Llandygai; SH6149366362; 53°10′35″N 4°04′26″W	4 November 1990	Water wheel house	Located between the slab mills at Felin Fawr Slate Works.	4154	Upload Photo
Eastern Slab Mill at Felin Fawr Slate Works	Llandygai; SH6150566367; 53°10′35″N 4°04′25″W	4 November 1990		Located in the centre of yard at the Felin Fawr Slate Works, which adjoin the former Penrhyn Slate Quarry Railway and the west bank of the Afon Galedffrwd.	4155	Upload Photo
Tanyrallt, Glanrafon Hill	Bangor; SH5783072107; 53°13′37″N 4°07′52″W	11 September 1987		On steeply sloping ground below the bend in the road; set amongst modern University buildings.	4163	Upload Photo
The Best Stables on S side of Vaynol Old Hall and courtyard walls.	Pentir; SH5382069521; 53°12′09″N 4°11′24″W	26 August 1992	Stables	The stables are set in the heart of Vaynol Park, attached to buildings at the W end of Vaynol Old Hall. They close the E side of the enclosed cobbled courtyard which opens from the main driveway to Vaynol Hall.	4167	Upload Photo
Terraced Garden to N of Vaynol Old Hall	Pentir; SH5384569562; 53°12′11″N 4°11′23″W	26 August 1992	Terracing	Laid out immediately N of the front driveway to Vaynol Old Hall. Its N end borders the walled garden to the rear of Dairy Cottage.	4169	Upload Photo
Gateway with inscription set in N boundary wall of Terrace Garden opposite Vaynol Old Hall	Pentir; SH5383069566; 53°12′11″N 4°11′24″W	3 March 1966	Gateway	Set in the heart of Vaynol Park, at the N end of the Terraced Garden opposite the N front of Vaynol Old Hall.	4170	Upload Photo
Long Barn at Vaynol Farm	Pentir; SH5378069640; 53°12′13″N 4°11′26″W	3 March 1966	Barn	The long barn stands at the centre of the Vaynol Farm buildings, the gable end facing the E approach drive. The farm lies to the N of Vaynol Old Hall.	4184	Upload Photo
Bodwrdda	Aberdaron; SH1887427194; 52°48′42″N 4°41′20″W	19 January 1952		Situated in Daron valley, down long drive running E and S from B4413 from junction 2 km SW of Rhoshirwaun.	4209	See more images
Plas yn Rhiw	Aberdaron; SH2361828228; 52°49′21″N 4°37′09″W	19 January 1952	Manor house	Situated some 1.1 km ENE of Rhiw, just off the road to Porth Neigwl.	4210	See more images
Wern Fawr	Llanbedrog; SH3231733414; 52°52′19″N 4°29′34″W	19 January 1952	Farmhouse	The farmhouse lies on a former trackway leading off the minor road from Llanbedrog to Rhyd-y-clafdy, at the N end of the community.	4214	Upload Photo
Castellmarch	Llanengan; SH3144329726; 52°50′19″N 4°30′14″W	19 January 1952		Situated down drive running W from A499 from point some 1.5 km N of Abersoch.	4215	Upload Photo
Bodfel	Llannor; SH3413736961; 52°54′16″N 4°28′03″W	19 January 1952		Bodfel stands to the NW of Efailnewydd, approached by a minor road running due N, approximately 400m N of Pont Bodfel.	4216	Upload Photo
Plas Bodegroes	Llannor; SH3548235283; 52°53′23″N 4°26′49″W	19 January 1952	Restaurant	The house stands in its own parkland and gardens, reached by a driveway from Bodegroes Lodge on the main road from Pwllheli to the NW.	4217	See more images
Cefnamwlch	Tudweiliog; SH2341535272; 52°53′09″N 4°37′33″W	19 January 1952		Situated in the centre of wooded parkland approximately 1.5 km S of the centre of Tudweiliog. The main approach drive of some 1.2 km runs SW from the Lower Lodge entrance off a minor road from Tudweiliog.	4222	Cefnamwlch
Bryn Nodol	Bryn Odol, Tudweiliog; SH2506836495; 52°53′50″N 4°36′08″W	19 January 1952	Holiday homes	Situated approximately 1.4 km SE of the centre of Tudweiliog, approached by a 350m drive off the road to Dinas.	4223	Bryn Nodol
Ty'n-y-graig	Aberdaron; SH2353228540; 52°49′31″N 4°37′14″W	19 October 1971	House	On the NE side of a lane running past Plas-yn-Rhiw to the Church of St Aelrhiw, some 1km E of Rhiw village.	4240	Ty'n-y-graig
Church of St Mary	Botwnnog; SH2262231481; 52°51′05″N 4°38′08″W	19 October 1971	Church	In a raised churchyard on the N side of the minor road leading NW from the centre of Bryncroes village to the B 4413.	4254	See more images
Nanhoron	Botwnnog; SH2805031477; 52°51′12″N 4°33′19″W	19 October 1971	House	Approximately 1.69km E of Botwnnog, reached along a private drive some 150m S from the B4413, surrounded by the estate park to the S and a walled vegetable and flower garden to the N.	4261	See more images
Church of St Tudwen	Llandudwen, Buan; SH2740636863; 52°54′05″N 4°34′03″W	19 October 1971	Church	Situated in isolated walled churchyard by Llandudwen farm, approached by drive running N off lane about 1.3 km W of Madryn Castle.	4266	See more images
Penhyddgan	Buan; SH3024038670; 52°55′07″N 4°31′35″W	19 October 1971		Situated some 2 km E of Ceidio church and approached by drive running SW from the A497 NW of Boduan.	4269	Upload Photo
Saethon Old Farmhouse	Llanengan; SH2949332742; 52°51′54″N 4°32′04″W	19 October 1971	Farmhouse	Situated some 600m down drive running NW from point some 1.4km NE of Capel Nant on road to Rhydyclafdy.	4275	Upload Photo
Church of St Mary	Dolbenmaen; SH5067043150; 52°57′54″N 4°13′30″W	19 October 1971	Church	The parish church lies on a small by-passed section of the main road at the junction with the Cwm Pennant road. It stands within an irregularly shaped graveyard and is approached through a lych gate.	4278	See more images
Church of St Cynhaearn	Dolbenmaen; SH5258338787; 52°55′34″N 4°11′40″W	19 October 1971	Disused church	The church stands alone on the former island in Llyn Ystumllyn, approx 900m S of Pentrefelin, and is reached by a track from the village.	4291	See more images
Church of St Aelhaearn	Llanaelhaearn; SH3870344815; 52°58′35″N 4°24′13″W	19 October 1971	Church	The church stands in the centre of a large irregular churchyard at the centre of the village, bounded by the road on the S and W.	4293	See more images
Church of St Pedrog	Llanbedrog; SH3294531553; 52°51′20″N 4°28′57″W	19 October 1971	Church	The church is located on the first level ground above the beach, at the lower end of Llanbedrog, and close to the small stream with defines the churchyard on the SE.	4297	See more images
Church of the Holy Cross	Llannor; SH3539237264; 52°54′27″N 4°26′57″W	19 October 1971	Church	The parish church stands at the centre of the village, within an oval churchyard.	4322	See more images
Llwyndyrus	Llannor; SH3862340834; 52°56′26″N 4°24′11″W	19 October 1971	Farmhouse	The farmhouse stands back from the road running NW from Y Ffor.	4323	Upload Photo
Plas-gwyn	Llannor; SH3956738422; 52°55′09″N 4°23′16″W	19 October 1971	Farmhouse	Plas-gwyn lies off the main Pwllheli to Caernarfon road, approximately 700m S of Y Ffor crossroads.	4327	Plas-gwyn
Church of St Garmon	Llanarmon, Llanystumdwy; SH4231639351; 52°55′42″N 4°20′50″W	19 October 1971	Church	The church is set in an elevated oval churchyard at the centre of the hamlet of Llanarmon.	4337	See more images
Church of St Cybi	Llangybi, Llanystumdwy; SH4285641171; 52°56′41″N 4°20′25″W	19 October 1971	Church	The parish church stands in its churchyard at the centre of the village of Llangybi.	4342	See more images
Highgate	Llanystumdwy; SH4753338416; 52°55′17″N 4°16′10″W	19 October 1971	House	Lloyd George's House. The house is in a row on the NE side of the main street, E of the bridge.	4355	See more images
Tŷ Newydd	Llanystumdwy; SH4788838426; 52°55′18″N 4°15′51″W	19 October 1971	House	The house is reached from a drive off the road leading W of the village centre, past Lloyd George's grave.	4357	See more images
Plas-du	Llanarmon, Llanystumdwy; SH4116540322; 52°56′12″N 4°21′54″W	19 October 1971	Farmhouse	The farm lies to the S of the village of Pencaenewydd, SW of the former turnpike road to Porthdinllaen.	4361	See more images
Church of St Mary	Penllech, Tudweiliog; SH2199334399; 52°52′39″N 4°38′48″W	19 October 1971	Disused church	Situated some 100m S of Plas-ym-Mhenllech at Penllech.	4380	See more images
Church of St Catherine, Lon Ednyfed	Lon Ednyfed, Criccieth; SH5007838337; 52°55′17″N 4°13′53″W	8 February 1949	Church		4395	See more images
Plas Tan-yr-allt	Porthmadog; SH5662940456; 52°56′32″N 4°08′06″W	30 March 1951	Country house hotel	In its own grounds and reached by private drive on the N side of the A498, approximately 0.5km NE of Tremadog Market Square.	4432	See more images
Church of St Mary	Tremadog, Porthmadog; SH5626140065; 52°56′19″N 4°08′25″W	30 March 1951	Church	Sited on an eminence in a large churchyard, to the South of the Market Square.	4435	See more images
Ty Nanney, including forecourt walls, gate piers and gate	Porthmadog; SH5624439962; 52°56′16″N 4°08′26″W	30 March 1951	House	Set back from the road in its own grounds, just S of the junction of Church Street (A487) and Isgraig.	4441	Ty Nanney, including forecourt walls, gate piers and gate
Tremadog Manufactory	Porthmadog; SH5638440317; 52°56′28″N 4°08′19″W	30 March 1951	Workshop	Set back on the N side of the A498 approximately 500m ENE of Tremadog Market Square.	4449	Upload Photo
Market Hall	Tremadog, Porthmadog; SH5617140190; 52°56′23″N 4°08′30″W	30 March 1951	Shop (Siola clothing)	Prominently sited on the N side of Market Square, set back from the road and raised above street level.	4452	See more images
Glasfryn House	Llanystumdwy; SH4021042578; 52°57′24″N 4°22′49″W	15 June 1978	House	The house is near the N boundary of the community, and is reached by a long driveway off the road running N of Pencaenewydd towards its junction with the A499.	4607	Upload Photo
Hovel at Tan-y-bwlch	Clynnog; SH4313448780; 53°00′48″N 4°20′23″W	18 May 1989	Cottage	The structure stands in the garden of Tan-y-bwlch, a farm on the N side of the road skirting the north side of Bwlch Mawr and running towards Pencaenewydd.	4618	Upload Photo
Church of St Beuno	Penmorfa, Dolbenmaen; SH5413040295; 52°56′25″N 4°10′20″W	19 October 1971	Church	Located on the end of an old road leading SW from the W end of Penmorfa village.	4623	See more images
Moriah Methodist Chapel	Llanystumdwy; SH4746538434; 52°55′18″N 4°16′13″W	24 October 1991	Chapel	The building is located at the centre of the village, set back from and below the road; opposite the Lloyd George Memorial Museum. The lawned churchyard has a low rubble boundary wall to the road.	4624	See more images
Wern Manor	Dolbenmaen; SH5427739927; 52°56′13″N 4°10′11″W	15 June 1993	Manor house	The manor is set in its own grounds, some 2km W of Tremadoc and S of Penmorfa village, and can be reached by the private driveway from the main road.	4626	Wern Manor
Dolaugwyn	Bryn Crug; SH6230803464; 52°36′41″N 4°02′06″W	30 March 1951	Farmhouse	The farm is on flat land of the lower Afon Fathew valley, to the W of Bryn Crug village. The farmhouse stands apart to the W of the farm buildings.	4632	Upload Photo
Hen Dyffryn Gwyn	Tywyn; SN6324298323; 52°33′56″N 4°01′09″W	30 March 1951	House	Set back on the S side of the minor road through Cwm Maethlon, approximately 5.1km SE of Tywyn.	4633	Hen Dyffryn Gwyn
Crogen	Llandderfel; SJ0063737010; 52°55′17″N 3°28′46″W	12 June 1951	House	Located at the eastern boundary of the community within its own grounds; set back from the road and accessed via lodged drives.	4650	Upload Photo
Henblas including adjoining Barn Range	Llandderfel; SH9885737804; 52°55′41″N 3°30′22″W	6 December 1951	House	Located approximately 800m NE of Llandderfel village and accessed via a farm track running N from an unclassified road running NE from the village.	4651	Henblas including adjoining Barn Range
Plas Rhiwaedog	Llangywer; SH9471134806; 52°54′01″N 3°34′00″W	12 June 1951	Hall	Located at the end of a private driveway that leads NE from the country road at Pont Rhiwaedog; c. 400m ENE of the village of Rhos-y-gwaliau.	4652	Plas Rhiwaedog
Pont Fawr	Llandderfel; SH9819436597; 52°55′02″N 3°30′56″W	20 October 1966	Bridge	Spanning the River Dee approximately 0.5km S of Llandderfel village, and carrying the Bala – Corwen road.	4658	Pont Fawr
Gwern-y-braichdwr	Llandderfel; SH9972042214; 52°58′04″N 3°29′41″W	20 October 1966	Farmhouse	Located on the southern slope of the Cwm Main, at the eastern end; accessed via a track running from a lane itself running W from Glan-yr-Afon	4660	Upload Photo
Capel Ainon	Llanuwchllyn; SH8699629774; 52°51′13″N 3°40′47″W	20 October 1966	Chapel	Located approximately 1km SW of Llanuwchllyn village, set back slightly from the road within its own low-walled graveyard.	4679	Upload Photo
Caer Gai, including adjoining forecourt walls to the NE	Llanuwchllyn; SH8773531493; 52°52′09″N 3°40′09″W	20 October 1966	House	Located approximately 2km N of Llanuwchllyn village within the site of the Roman fort; accessed via a track running N from the main road.	4683	Upload Photo
Pont Dol-y-Moch	Ffestiniog; SH6849441648; 52°57′22″N 3°57′33″W	24 April 1951	Bridge	Spanning the Afon Dwyryd about 1km SE of Rhyd-y-sarn at the SW boundary of this community area with that of Maentwrog.	4694	Pont Dol-y-Moch
Pengwern Old Hall	Ffestiniog; SH6991943045; 52°58′08″N 3°56′18″W	24 April 1951	Hall	Located on a rise overlooking the Ceunant Sych approximately 2km N of Ffestiniog; accessed via a farm track leading W off an unclassified lane connecting the A 470 with the A 496.	4699	Upload Photo
Plas Tan-y-Bwlch including attached terraced walls to east and west	Tan-y-Bwlch, Maentwrog; SH6555040630; 52°56′46″N 4°00′09″W	24 April 1951	Study centre	In an elevated location, set within private grounds above the NW side of the A487(T) on the W approach to the village of Maentwrog.	4702	Plas Tan-y-Bwlch including attached terraced walls to east and west
Cors y Gedol Hall	Dyffryn Ardudwy; SH6001123079; 52°47′14″N 4°04′38″W	14 June 1952		In private grounds set well back from the ENE side of the A496 between Dyffryn Ardudwy and Tal-y-bont. The hall is located at the head of a driveway (Ffordd Gors) leading ENE out of the small hamlet of Llanddwywe.	4709	See more images
Nannau Hall	Brithdir and Llanfachreth; SH7430720814; 52°46′13″N 3°51′52″W	14 June 1952	Former family seat of the Lords of Nannau, now in use for farming and forestry.	Home is a wreck and abandoned and put up for sale as of 2025.	4710	See more images
Cae'r Berllan	Llanfihangel y Pennant; SH6630707772; 52°39′04″N 3°58′40″W	14 June 1952	Farmhouse	The farmhouse stands back from the farm buildings, facing the W.	4711	Upload Photo
Lychgate at St Paul's Church	Brithdir and Llanfachreth; SH7967320765; 52°46′16″N 3°47′06″W	17 June 1966	Lychgate		4713	Lychgate at St Paul's Church
Plas Hen	Brithdir and Llanfachreth; SH7656817735; 52°44′35″N 3°49′48″W	17 June 1966			4714	Plas Hen
Egryn Abbey	Tal-y-bont, Dyffryn Ardudwy; SH5951820327; 52°45′44″N 4°05′00″W	17 June 1966	Farmhouse	Set back from the NE side of the A496, c. 1.5km SSE of Tal-y-bont. The house and associated farm buildings are reached by a private track.	4717	Egryn Abbey
St Dwywe’s Church	Dyffryn Ardudwy; SH5864122334; 52°46′48″N 4°05′50″W	17 June 1966	Church	Within a churchyard to the W side of the A496 in the small hamlet of Llanddwywe.	4718	See more images
Corn barn at Cors y Gedol Hall	Dyffryn Ardudwy; SH6007123077; 52°47′14″N 4°04′35″W	17 June 1966	Barn	Cors y Gedol is ENE of Llanddwywe. The corn barn lies to E of the hall.	4720	Upload Photo
Gatehouse at Cors y Gedol Hall	Dyffryn Ardudwy; SH6002423044; 52°47′12″N 4°04′37″W	17 June 1966	Gatehouse	In private grounds set well back from the ENE side of the A496 between Dyffryn Ardudwy and Tal-y-bont. Located at the head of a driveway (Ffordd Gors) leading ENE out of the small hamlet of Llanddwywe. The gatehouse is directly S of the hall.	4722	Gatehouse at Cors y Gedol Hall
Peniarth	Llanegryn; SH6121505401; 52°37′43″N 4°03′07″W	17 June 1966	House	The Peniarth Estate occupies a considerable tract of land on the N bank of the Afon Dysynni, E of Llanegryn village. The house stands towards the S edge of the parkland, overlooking the river and the valley to the S.	4731	See more images
Church of St Illtyd including churchyard walls and gatepiers	Llanelltyd; SH7175319546; 52°45′30″N 3°54′07″W	17 June 1966	Church	Set back slightly from the main road on a slight rise; set within its own circular, walled churchyard.	4737	See more images
Ty Fanner	Llanelltyd; SH7208919546; 52°45′30″N 3°53′49″W	17 June 1966		Located immediately to the W of Cymer Abbey ruins; accessed via a lane running NE from the main road.	4739	Upload Photo
Pont Llanelltyd	Llanelltyd; SH7180219320; 52°45′22″N 3°54′04″W	17 June 1966	Bridge	A 470 (NE side), Llanelltyd	4741	See more images
Church of St Michael	Llanfihandel-y-Pennant; SH6714408863; 52°39′40″N 3°57′57″W	17 June 1966	Church	The parish church stands on the valley floor of the upper Dysynni valley, within its own sub-oval churchyard.	4747	See more images
Front garden walls, gate piers and mounting block at Cae'r Berllan	Llanfihangel-y-Pennant; SH6629707791; 52°39′05″N 3°58′40″W	17 June 1966		The front garden walls define the raised rectangular garden in front of the main NW elevation of Cae'r Berllan.	4750	Upload Photo
St Tydecho's Church	Mallwyd, Mawddwy; SH8628712359; 52°41′49″N 3°41′03″W	17 June 1966	Church	The church stands at the S end of the village of Mallwyd, which is by-passed by the present A470.	4756	See more images
Cefn-caer	Pennal; SH7042100120; 52°35′00″N 3°54′50″W	17 June 1966	Farmhouse	The farmhouse is located c400m SE opf the village, in an elevated position on the NW side of the defences of the Roman fort. The farmyard lies further to the SW of the house.	4761	Cefn-caer
Church of St Mary	Tal-y-Llyn, Llanfihangel-y-Pennant; SH7106109406; 52°40′01″N 3°54′29″W	17 June 1966	Church	The church stands at Tal-y-Llyn, beside the road from Minffordd to Abergynolwyn, at the S end of Tal-y-Llyn lake.	4762	See more images
Parc	Llanfrothen; SH6268543958; 52°58′31″N 4°02′47″W	28 April 1952	House	Strikingly located on an elevated site above the Afon Maesgwm, approximately 2km SW of Croesor; accessed via a long drive running SW from the Garreg to Croesor road.	4773	Upload Photo
Glyn Cywarch	Talsarnau; SH6085434284; 52°53′17″N 4°04′10″W	28 April 1952		In private grounds set well back from the NE side of the B4573, to S of Glan-y-wern and SE of Eisingrug.	4778	Upload Photo
Church of St Peter	Llanbedr; SH5849826979; 52°49′18″N 4°06′05″W	30 November 1966	Church	Within a subrectangular churchyard set well back from the NE side of the A496 at the N end of the village of Llanbedr.	4782	See more images
Church of St Mary	Llanfair; SH5776029070; 52°50′25″N 4°06′48″W	30 November 1966	Church	Within the churchyard to NE of the main road through the village of Llanfair which forms a loop off the A496.	4794	See more images
Llanfair-Isaf Farmhouse	Llanfair; SH5754128859; 52°50′18″N 4°06′59″W	30 November 1966		Set back from the W side of the A496.	4796	Upload Photo
Plas Brondanw	Garreg, Llanfrothen; SH6164242285; 52°57′36″N 4°03′41″W	30 November 1966	House	On a commanding, sloping site overlooking the Traeth Mawr 0.5km NE of Garreg village; backing onto a lane running NE from Garreg to Croesor and parallel with the A 4085. Set within its own gardens of national importance. Home of Clough Williams-Ellis.	4808	See more images
L-shaped Agricultural Range at Parc	Llanfrothen; SH6264143955; 52°58′31″N 4°02′50″W	30 November 1966	farm building	Located immediately to the W of Parc, facing a farmyard to the N.	4816	Upload Photo
Middle Parc including Fountain Basin adjoining to W	Llanfrothen; SH6271343964; 52°58′31″N 4°02′46″W	30 November 1966	House	Strikingly located on an elevated site above the Afon Maesgwm, approximately 2km SW of Croesor; sited some 50m NE of Parc.	4817	Upload Photo
Gattws Parc including Boulder Wall adjoining to NW	Llanfrothen; SH6281744025; 52°58′34″N 4°02′40″W	30 November 1966	House	Strikingly located on an elevated site above the Afon Maesgwm, approximately 2km SW of Croesor; sited into the hillslope immediately to the NW of the old approach road to Parc, approximately 200m NE of Parc.	4818	Upload Photo
Gatehouse at Glyn Cywarch	Talsarnau; SH6090034260; 52°53′16″N 4°04′08″W	30 November 1966	Gatehouse	In private grounds set well back from the NE side of the B4573, to S of Glan-y-wern and SE of Eisingrug; the gatehouse is directly SE of the house at Glyn Cywarch.	4844	Upload Photo
Plas Penrhyn	Penrhyndeudraeth; SH5905137922; 52°55′13″N 4°05′52″W	14 January 1971	House	Located towards the western boundary of the community on a commanding, elevated site overlooking Porthmadog and the Traeth Mawr; accessed via a lane running SW from the main road (A 487).	4852	Plas Penrhyn
Campanile (also called The Bell Tower)	Penrhyndeudraeth; SH5898937141; 52°54′47″N 4°05′55″W	14 January 1971	Bell tower	Prominently sited on the south-eastern ridge overlooking the village and hotel.	4868	See more images
The Colonnade	Penrhyndeudraeth; SH5897937179; 52°54′49″N 4°05′55″W	14 January 1971	Colonnade	Overlooking the Central Piazza to the E.	4878	See more images
Ty Gwyn with Davy Jones' Locker Cafe	Barmouth; SH6151015495; 52°43′10″N 4°03′07″W	4 March 1951	House/Cafe	Harbour Street (E side), Barmouth Harbour	4897	See more images
Aykroyd & Sons, Clothing Factory (Former Workhouse)	Bala; SH9252135857; 52°54′34″N 3°35′59″W	19 October 1951		Fronting the street towards the SW end of the town.	4913	Aykroyd & Sons, Clothing Factory (Former Workhouse)
Llwyn	Dolgellau; SH7324218132; 52°44′45″N 3°52′45″W	19 June 1990		Bala Road	4924	Upload Photo
Plas Gwyn	Dolgellau; SH7273017686; 52°44′30″N 3°53′12″W	19 June 1990	House	Finsbury Square	4989	Plas Gwyn
Tan-y-Fynwent	Dolgellau; SH7270017809; 52°44′34″N 3°53′14″W	2 December 1952		Marian Road	5033	See more images
T. H. Roberts shop	Dolgellau; SH7282617841; 52°44′36″N 3°53′07″W	19 June 1990	Shop	Ironmonger, Queen's Square (E Side)	5059	See more images
County Hall	Dolgellau; SH7286917938; 52°44′39″N 3°53′05″W	2 December 1952	Courthouse	Smithfield Street	5073	See more images
Bryn-y-Gwin Uchaf	Dolgellau; SH7202417791; 52°44′33″N 3°53′50″W	19 June 1990	House	Towyn Road	5115	Bryn-y-Gwin Uchaf
Dolgun Isaf Farmhouse	Dolgellau; SH7447118224; 52°44′49″N 3°51′40″W	19 June 1990	Farmhouse	A470 (N. side)	5123	Upload Photo
Dolgun Uchaf	Dolgellau; SH7469518376; 52°44′54″N 3°51′28″W	17 June 1966		A470 (N. side)	5125	Dolgun Uchaf
Barn at Dolgun Uchaf	Dolgellau; SH7469018386; 52°44′55″N 3°51′29″W	17 June 1966	Barn	A470 (N.side)	5126	Upload Photo
Byre at Dolgun Uchaf	Dolgellau; SH7470718385; 52°44′55″N 3°51′28″W	17 June 1966	Byre	A470 (N.SIDE)	5127	Upload Photo
Gazebo or Music Room at Dolrhyd	Dolgellau; SH7164018445; 52°44′54″N 3°54′11″W	23 November 1987	Gazebo	A470 (N.side)	5129	Upload Photo
Garth Maelan	Dolgellau; SH7430318894; 52°45′11″N 3°51′50″W	19 June 1990		Road to Llanfachreth	5134	Upload Photo
Bryn-y-Gwin (Bryn-y-Gwin Isaf)	Dolgellau; SH7169717820; 52°44′34″N 3°54′07″W	17 June 1966		Towyn Road	5165	Upload Photo
Cae'r March	Brithdir and Llanfachreth; SH7613421832; 52°46′47″N 3°50′16″W	20 March 1975			5188	Upload Photo
Barmouth Railway Bridge	Barmouth; SH6196315486; 52°43′10″N 4°02′42″W	22 March 1988	Bridge	(partly in Arthog community)	5207	See more images
Yr Ysgwrn Farmhouse, stable and cartshed	Trawsfynydd; SH7229634668; 52°53′39″N 3°53′59″W	10 June 1989	Farmhouse	Sited on rising ground on the S side of Cwm Prysor and reached via a farm track off the road from Trawsfynydd.	5217	See more images
Dower House at Llwyndu	Barmouth; SH6000618535; 52°44′47″N 4°04′31″W	27 November 1986	Dower House	A 496 (E. side) Llanaber	5229	Upload Photo
The Cob	Penrhyndeudraeth; SH5802138037; 52°55′15″N 4°06′48″W	22 February 1991	Causeway	The Cob crosses the Traeth Mawr and the mouth of the Afon Glaslyn in Tremadoc Bay estuary and carries both the A487 and the Ffestiniog Railway from Boston Lodge to Porthmadoc. Spans District and Community boundaries.	5234	The Cob
The Cruck Hall at Rhowniar Outward Bound Centre	Aberdovey; SN5973098258; 52°33′51″N 4°04′15″W	12 October 1991	Hall	A493 (E dide), Rhowniar	5240	Upload Photo
Plas Mynach	Barmouth; SH6080716611; 52°43′45″N 4°03′46″W	25 February 1992	House	A 496, Hendremynach	5244	Plas Mynach
The New Lodge	Plas Brondanw, Llanfrothen; SH6142042045; 52°57′28″N 4°03′52″W	27 October 1992	House	Approximately 0.4km SW of Plas Brondanw at the junction with the by-road to Croesor. Set back and at a splayed angle, with ball finial to forecourt wall.	5248	The New Lodge
St Philip's Church	Caerdeon, Barmouth; SH6512418138; 52°44′38″N 3°59′58″W	11 September 1992	Church	A496 (N side) Caerdeon	5249	See more images
Dock, perimeter wall and attached buildings to east of Fort Belan	Llandwrog; SH4415860928; 53°07′22″N 4°19′49″W	23 February 1994	Dock	Situated at water edge directly to east of Fort Belan.	14409	Dock, perimeter wall and attached buildings to east of Fort Belan
Bryn Dinas	Tywyn; SN6350798583; 52°34′04″N 4°00′55″W	7 December 1994	House	Reached by a short farm road on the N side of the minor road through Cwm Maethlon, approximately 5.3km SE of Tywyn.	14552	Upload Photo
Bryntirion	Pentir; SH5313668651; 53°11′41″N 4°11′59″W	3 March 1966	House	Bryntirion lies near the S end of Vaynol Park and is reached by a drive entered from the main road at Aber Pwll which climbs up through Bryntirion Lodge Wood to the sloping site of Bryntirion and its outbuildings.	14924	Bryntirion
Cefndeuddwr Farmhouse	Ganllwyd; SH7300726070; 52°49′02″N 3°53′09″W	13 February 1995	Farmhouse	A470 (E side), Cefndeuddwr	15156	Upload Photo
Ystumllyn	Criccieth; SH5186238784; 52°55′34″N 4°12′19″W	12 December 1994		Ffordd Porthmadog (Porthmadoc Road) (SE side)	15355	See more images
Former Stables	Criccieth; SH5187138801; 52°55′34″N 4°12′18″W	12 December 1994	Stables	Ffordd Porthmadog (Porthmadoc Road) (SE side)	15356	Upload Photo
Wash House	Criccieth; SH5185038794; 52°55′34″N 4°12′19″W	12 December 1994	Wash house	Ffordd Porthmadog (Porthmadoc Road) (SE side)	15357	Upload Photo
Morris and Co., General Cambrian Establishment	Barmouth; SH6141015710; 52°43′16″N 4°03′12″W	31 January 1995	Shop	(Former Drapers' Shop) High Street (SW side), Barmouth	15464	Morris and Co., General Cambrian Establishment
Glan Glasfor to the rear of Morris and Co.	Barmouth; SH6141015710; 52°43′17″N 4°03′12″W	31 January 1995	House	High Street (SW side), Barmouth	15465	Glan Glasfor to the rear of Morris and Co.
St John's Church	Barmouth; SH6132715942; 52°43′24″N 4°03′17″W	31 January 1995	Church	St John's Hill, Barmouth	15467	See more images
Plas Canol	Barmouth; SH5988918970; 52°45′01″N 4°04′38″W	31 January 1995	House	Situated on a hill to the E of the main road, and reached via a long farm track; about 1km N of Llanaber.	15503	Upload Photo
Former Farmhouse at Cefn-yr-Owen-Uchaf	Arthog; SH6828015069; 52°43′02″N 3°57′05″W	2 January 1995	Farmhouse	Ffordd Ddu (N side) Cefn-yr-Owen-Uchaf	15593	Upload Photo
Garth Isaf Farmhouse	Arthog; SH6537415996; 52°43′29″N 3°59′42″W	2 January 1995	Farmhouse	Located 0.5km NW of the main road in a hollow near the estuary and accessed via a long wooded track; raised up behind a dwarf-walled terrace, its E gable facing the former, disused road.	15598	Upload Photo
Hafod Dywyll Farmhouse, Kings	Arthog; SH6857515948; 52°43′31″N 3°56′51″W	20 March 1975	Farmhouse		15606	Upload Photo
Braich-y-Ceunant	Brithdir and Llanfachreth; SH7634118154; 52°44′49″N 3°50′00″W	26 May 1995			16013	Upload Photo
Ty Cerrig	Brithdir and Llanfachreth; SH7688720802; 52°46′15″N 3°49′35″W	26 May 1995	House		16061	Upload Photo
Hydro-Electric Power station	Ffestiniog; SH6971446878; 53°00′12″N 3°56′35″W	2 January 1996	Power Station	Located immediately to the W of the main road on an island between it and the main railway line, on the downhill approach to Blaenau Ffestiniog from the Crimea Pass.	16884	Hydro-Electric Power station
Slate Dressing Mill	Ffestiniog; SH7134546598; 53°00′04″N 3°55′07″W	2 January 1996	Slate mill	On the main Maenofferen level, a working underground quarry, high above Llechwedd.	16888	Upload Photo
Powered Incline Drumhouse including chimney	Ffestiniog; SH7146346617; 53°00′05″N 3°55′01″W	2 January 1996	Drumhouse	At the end of a short rock tunnel linking the main Maenofferen level with the underground incline 100m E of the slab mill.	16892	Upload Photo
Arched wall to forecourt of Vaynol Old Hall	Pentir; SH5382569556; 53°12′11″N 4°11′24″W	22 September 1997	Wall	Located at the W side of the forecourt between Vaynol Old Hall and the Terraced Garden, and adjoining the Chapel of St Mary.	18927	Upload Photo
Plas Glyn-y-Weddw	Llanbedrog; SH3289831428; 52°51′16″N 4°29′00″W	20 January 1998	Hall	The house is set in wooded grounds about 150m S of Llanbedrog church, and facing E to Cardigan Bay and Snowdonia over a front lawn.	19237	See more images
Gatehouse at Cefnamwlch	Tudweiliog; SH2339035308; 52°53′10″N 4°37′35″W	3 February 1998	Gatehouse	Situated at the end and to the left of the main approach drive to Cefnamwlch, approximately 10m N of the NW corner of the main house.	19428	Upload Photo
War Memorial	Garreg, Llanfrothen; SH6123041728; 52°57′18″N 4°04′02″W	14 May 1998	War Memorial	Prominently sited at the cross-roads in the centre of the village; on a raised platform with semi-circular rubble enclosing walls and iron gates and railings to the road side, terminating in cylindrical rubble piers.	19792	See more images
The Orangery at Plas Brondanw Gardens	Llanfrothen; SH6158142252; 52°57′35″N 4°03′44″W	14 May 1998	Orangery	Prominently-sited on the western boundary of the garden.	19816	The Orangery at Plas Brondanw Gardens
Carmel Chapel	Aberdaron; SH1625628402; 52°49′18″N 4°43′42″W	19 November 1997	Chapel	Situated some 600m SSW of Carreg at T-junction with road from Aberdaron.	20009	See more images
Frondeg	Aberdaron; SH2399429173; 52°49′52″N 4°36′51″W	26 June 1998		Situated on common land NW of Rhiw church, some 300m N of Gwern-saer, above Bryn-y-ffynnon.	20021	Upload Photo
Bron-y-foel-isaf	Dyffryn Ardudwy; SH6028724587; 52°48′03″N 4°04′26″W	20 August 1998	House	In a remote position about 2 km NE of Coed Ystumgwern, reached by track on S side of minor road.	20278	Upload Photo
Cwm Dyli Power Station	Beddgelert; SH6532053972; 53°03′58″N 4°00′41″W	25 November 1998	Power Station	Located towards the northern boundary of the community in an isolated site on the E side of the Afon Cynnyd, at the end of the Glaslyn valley; accessed via a long track continuing on from the old valley road.	20926	See more images
Ynys Pandy Slate Mill	Dolbenmaen; SH5498943363; 52°58′05″N 4°09′39″W	30 March 1999	Slate Mill	The mill stands on a bluff overlooking the S bank of the Afon Henwy, in the Cwmystradllyn.	21538	See more images
Clenennau	Dolbenmaen; SH5320442455; 52°57′34″N 4°11′13″W	30 March 1999	Farmhouse	This important farm stands on the NE side of the road from Tremadoc to Golan and Dolbenmaen.	21541	Upload Photo
Gorllwynuchaf	Dolbenmaen; SH5762942681; 52°57′45″N 4°07′16″W	30 March 1999	House	The house stands alone on the moorland of Mynydd Gorllwyn, and is reached by a track approximately 1500m long from the Prenteg to Cwmystradllyn minor road.	21550	Upload Photo
Broom Hall	Llanystumdwy; SH4121037215; 52°54′32″N 4°21′46″W	19 January 1952	Hall	Broom Hall lies in its own parkland, E of Pwllheli, and on the N side of the Criccieth to Pwllheli Road.	21586	Broom Hall
Grave of David Lloyd George	Llanystumdwy; SH4755938572; 52°55′22″N 4°16′08″W	31 March 1999	Grave	The grave is on the N side of the road leading E from Pont Llanystumdwy, and on the wooded high bank of the Afon Dwyfor.	21601	See more images
Capel Methodistiaid Calfinaidd	Pistyll; SH3578143172; 52°57′39″N 4°26′47″W	18 May 1999	Chapel	The (Calvinistic Methodist) chapel stands E of the centre of the village, with its axis parallel to the main road.	21726	See more images
Church of St Padarn	Llanberis; SH5787259974; 53°07′05″N 4°07′31″W	28 May 1999	Church	Located in a prominent position on rising ground behind the Dolbadarn Hotel on the south side of Stryd Fawr (High Street); the churchyard is of irregular shape and is approached from the north through iron gates in a rubblestone wall.	21833	See more images
Capel Coch	Llanberis; SH5765660030; 53°07′06″N 4°07′42″W	28 May 1999	Chapel	Situated on very slightly rising ground on the south side of Ffordd Capel-Coch, the chapel occupies a prominent position in the street; low rubblestone wall to street continues to east to enclose forecourt with iron gates to north-east corner.	21853	Capel Coch
Glan Gwna Hall	Waunfawr; SH5017262052; 53°08′04″N 4°14′28″W	21 July 1999		Situated to the north of Ffordd Waenfawr in its own landscaped grounds, most of which are now occupied by the chalets and other structures associated with Glan Gwna Holiday Park.	22055	See more images
Church of St Twrog	Llandwrog; SH4512156077; 53°04′46″N 4°18′49″W	30 September 1999	Church	Situated in the centre of Llandwrog village in raised roughly circular-shaped churchyard.	22417	See more images
Lych-gate and churchyard wall at the Church of St Twrog	Llandwrog; SH4509056071; 53°04′46″N 4°18′51″W	30 September 1999		The lych-gate stands on the south-east side of St Twrog's raised and roughly circular-shaped churchyard, which is surrounded and retained by the churchyard wall.	22418	Lych-gate and churchyard wall at the Church of St Twrog
Bryn Hall	Mawddwy; SH9077819391; 52°45′40″N 3°37′12″W	11 April 1999	House	The house stands in its own grounds below the main road through the Dyfi valley, approximately 520m N of Llanymawddwy.	22624	Upload Photo
Pont ar Dyfi (partly in Machynlleth Community)	Corris; SH7441701921; 52°36′02″N 3°51′20″W	19 December 1951	Bridge	Spanning the River Dovey to N of Machynlleth, Powys.	22723	See more images
Plas Aberllefenni	Corris; SH7710909941; 52°40′24″N 3°49′08″W	12 June 1999	House	The house stands at the N end of Aberllefenni, in a loop of the road running to the E to Aberangell.	22727	Upload Photo
Ty Mawr	Nantlle, Llanllyfni; SH5086053344; 53°03′23″N 4°13′36″W	29 May 1968		Located at the western end of Nantlle near the eastern entrance to the Dorothea Slate Quarry.	22899	Ty Mawr
Engine House, Boilerhouse, Bunker and remains of chimney to south	Llanllyfni; SH4972753124; 53°03′15″N 4°14′37″W	12 October 1992	Engine House	On a ridge of rock which divides the main Dorothea Quarry from the South Dorothea Quarry; located by the side of the road access to the quarry. Pump house.	22901	Engine House, Boilerhouse, Bunker and remains of chimney to south
Bridge at the mouth of the Afon Ogwen (partly in Llandygai community)	Llanllechid; SH6107072139; 53°13′41″N 4°04′58″W	3 September 2000	Bridge	Situated at the mouth of the Afon Ogwen where it flows into the sea approximately 120m east of Capel Ogwen; carries the drive from Port Lodge to Capel Ogwen; remains of small stone-paved wharf on eastern bank.	22931	Bridge at the mouth of the Afon Ogwen (partly in Llandygai community)
Farmbuildings at Ty'n-yr-hendre	Llanllechid; SH6224971130; 53°13′10″N 4°03′53″W	3 September 2000	Farm buildings	Situated around 4 sides of an excellently preserved cobbled yard below and to the north-west of the former farmhouse at Ty'n-yr-hendre.	22971	Upload Photo
Shelter Shed/Pigsties at Ty'n-yr-hendre	Llanllechid; SH6226671138; 53°13′10″N 4°03′52″W	3 September 2000	Pigsties	Located in the middle of the cobbled farmyard at Ty'n-yr-hendre.	22972	Upload Photo
Wyatt Memorial at the Church of St Tegai	Llandygai; SH6008470977; 53°13′03″N 4°05′49″W	24 May 2000	Memorial	Located directly to the south of the chancel of the Church of St Tegai.	23366	Wyatt Memorial at the Church of St Tegai
New Dock (quay)	Llandygai; SH5912572880; 53°14′03″N 4°06′44″W	24 May 2000	Quay	Built on Bangor flats at the mouth of the Afon Cegain which flows into the Menai Strait at this point.	23439	Upload Photo
Bridge at the mouth of the Afon Ogwen (partly in Llanllechid community)	Llandygai; SH6105672141; 53°13′41″N 4°04′58″W	3 September 2000	Bridge	Situated at the mouth of the Afon Ogwen where it flows into the sea approximately 120m east of Capel Ogwen; carries the drive from Port Lodge to Capel Ogwen; remains of small stone-paved wharf on eastern bank.	23456	Bridge at the mouth of the Afon Ogwen (partly in Llanllechid community)
Pale Hall	Llandderfel; SH9826236078; 52°54′45″N 3°30′52″W	31 January 2001	Hall	Located on the eastern side of the River Dee approximately 1.2km S of Llandderfel village; accessed via a drive leading from the road.	24595	See more images
Parish Church of St Deiniol	Llanuwchllyn; SH8737130282; 52°51′30″N 3°40′27″W	31 January 2001	Church	Within its own raised and walled churchyard in the centre of the village.	24688	See more images
Neuadd Wen	Llanuwchllyn; SH8785330052; 52°51′23″N 3°40′01″W	31 January 2001		Set within its own grounds within the village, not far from the station.	24696	Neuadd Wen
Gwyndy	Llanuwchllyn; SH8785630063; 52°51′23″N 3°40′01″W	31 January 2001	House	Set within its own grounds within the village, not far from the station.	24697	Upload Photo
Coleg Harlech including Terrace Revettment Walls to the W	Harlech; SH5782830805; 52°51′21″N 4°06′47″W	21 June 2001	College	Set back slightly from the road within its own grounds with commanding views across the Morfa.	25511	See more images
Rosedale, including Forecourt Walls & Railings	Bala; SH9269336167; 52°54′44″N 3°35′50″W	13 December 2001	House	Set back behind a walled and railed forecourt; belonging to terrace of 8.	25968	Rosedale, including Forecourt Walls & Railings
Derlwyn	Bala; SH9268836162; 52°54′44″N 3°35′50″W	13 December 2001	House	Set back behind a walled and railed forecourt; belonging to terrace of 8.	25969	Derlwyn
Islwyn	Bala; SH9268536157; 52°54′44″N 3°35′50″W	13 December 2001	House	Set back behind a walled and railed forecourt; belonging to terrace of 8.	25970	Islwyn
Ronville	Bala; SH9268036154; 52°54′43″N 3°35′51″W	13 December 2001	House	Set back behind a walled and railed forecourt; belonging to terrace of 8.	25971	Ronville
Dolydd	Bala; SH9267536149; 52°54′43″N 3°35′51″W	13 December 2001	House	Set back behind a walled and railed forecourt; belonging to terrace of 8.	25972	Dolydd
Fedw Arian	Bala; SH9267136144; 52°54′43″N 3°35′51″W	13 December 2001	House	Set back behind a walled and railed forecourt; belonging to terrace of 8.	25973	Fedw Arian
Isfryn	Bala; SH9266736140; 52°54′43″N 3°35′51″W	13 December 2001	House	Set back behind a walled and railed forecourt; belonging to terrace of 8.	25974	Isfryn
Awelfryn	Bala; SH9266136136; 52°54′43″N 3°35′52″W	13 December 2001	House	Set back behind a walled and railed forecourt; belonging to terrace of 8.	25975	Awelfryn
Caernarfon Royal Town Council Offices, including 10 Bangor Street	Caernarfon; SH4801862850; 53°08′28″N 4°16′25″W	5 March 2002	Offices	On the corner of Pavilion Hill and Bangor Street.	26598	Upload Photo
Felin Sarn	Llanddeiniolen; SH5718763138; 53°08′46″N 4°08′12″W	21 May 2003	Mill	On S side of minor road through village, about 1km E of junction with B 4547.	80871	Upload Photo
Gateway to the Church of Saint Mary	Tremadog, Porthmadog; SH5628240037; 52°56′18″N 4°08′24″W	4 January 1974	Gateway	Forming the W entrance to the churchyard, from Church Street.	83132	Gateway to the Church of Saint Mary
Llanfendigaid	Llangelynnin; SH5675804994; 52°37′26″N 4°07′03″W	6 July 2005	House	In its own grounds on the W side of a minor road approximately 1.2km SW of Rhoslefain hamlet.	84474	See more images
Multi-purpose farm range at Bryndinas	Tywyn; SN6350198543; 52°34′03″N 4°00′55″W	24 June 2005	Farm buildings	To the S of the house and the central of 3 parallel farm ranges.	84545	Upload Photo
The Cob (partly in Penrhyndeudraeth)	Porthmadog; SH5746738294; 52°55′23″N 4°07′18″W	22 February 1991	Causeway	Embankment across the S end of Traeth Mawr, on the E side of Porthmadog harbour and town.	85406	See more images
Taltreuddyn-Fawr	Dyffryn Ardudwy; SH5827525677; 52°48′36″N 4°06′15″W	13 October 2006	House	On the north side of a lane which runs west from the A496, some 2.5km north of Dyffryn Ardudwy.	87510	Upload Photo
Nant Pasgan-Mawr	Talsarnau; SH6541936556; 52°54′34″N 4°00′10″W	20 October 2008	House	In an isolated upland location on the NW side of the little valley of the Nant Ddu, beyond the road-head of a lane which trends ESE from Llyn Tecwyn Isa, and follows the valley beyond Caerwych. The principal front faces across the Nant Ddu valley.	87558	Upload Photo

== See also ==
- Grade I listed buildings in Gwynedd
- Scheduled monuments in Gwynedd
- Registered historic parks and gardens in Gwynedd
