= County Hall, Dolgellau =

County Building in Dolgellau, Wales

County Hall
- Neuadd y Sir Dolgellau (Welsh)
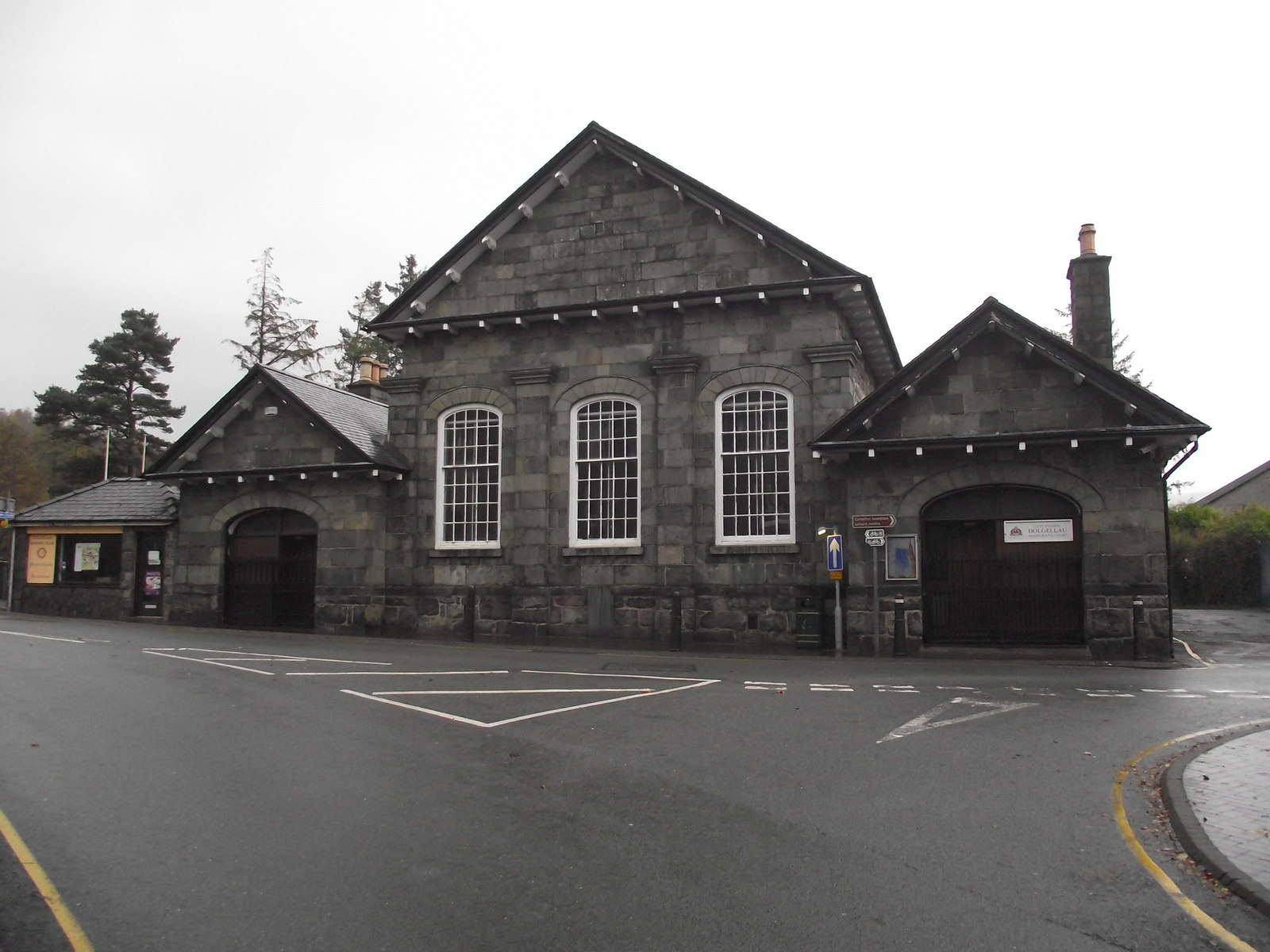
- County Hall

- Shown in Gwynedd
- 52.7441°N 3.8848°W
- Location: Smithfield Street, Dolgellau

History
- Built: 1825

Site notes
- Architect: Edward Haycock
- Architectural style: Neoclassical style

Listed Building – Grade II*
- Official name: County Hall
- Designated: 12 February 1952
- Reference no.: 5073

County Hall (Welsh: Neuadd y Sir Dolgellau) is a municipal building in Smithfield Street, Dolgellau, Gwynedd, Wales. The structure, which was the headquarters of Merionethshire County Council, is a Grade II* listed building.

== History ==
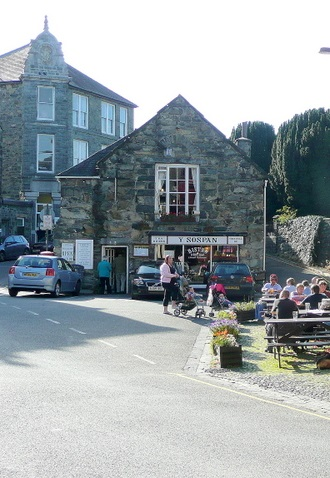
The old courthouse (Y Sospan)

The first county building in the town was the old courthouse (Welsh: Y Sospan) in Queen's Square which was built in rubble masonry and completed in 1606. However, by the early 19th century the justices decided it was too small and sought a more substantial structure. (Note: The old courthouse was acquired by Sir Robert Williames Vaughan, 3rd Baronet in 1827 and remained in his ownership until his death in 1859. In the mid-19th century it became a museum and public reading room in what was then described as the old town hall. By the early 20th century it had become a local solicitor's office, and it currently serves as a restaurant and coffee house.)

The building in Smithfield Street was designed by Edward Haycock in the neoclassical style, built in ashlar stone at a cost of £3,000 and was completed in 1825. The design involved a symmetrical main frontage with five bays facing onto Smithfield Street with the end bays shorter than the central section and projected forward; the central section of three bays was fenestrated by three large segmental windows flanked by Tuscan order pilasters, while the end bays contained arched openings with wrought iron gates. The central section and each of the two end bays were surmounted by modillioned pediments. Internally, the principal room was the main courtroom which was in the central section.

The building continued to serve in a judicial capacity as the venue for the courts of assize, with the justices alternating their weekly hearings between Dolgellau and Bala. Following the implementation of the Local Government Act 1888, which established county councils in every county, Merionethshire County Council set up its headquarters in the building, before moving to modern facilities at Cae Penarlag in Dolgellau in 1953.

The building continued to serve as the venue for magistrates' court hearings until the courts service relocated to the Caernarfon Criminal Justice Centre in 2016. The building then remained vacant for two years before being occupied by a dentist's practice in 2018.

== See also ==
- Grade II* listed buildings in Gwynedd
