= Registered historic parks and gardens in Gwynedd =

List of buildings in county of Wales

Gwynedd shown within Wales

Gwynedd is a county in the north-west of Wales. It covers an area of 2,535 km^{2} (979 sq mi) and in 2021 the population was approximately 117,100.

The Cadw/ICOMOS Register of Parks and Gardens of Special Historic Interest in Wales was established in 2002 and given statutory status in 2022. It is administered by Cadw, the historic environment agency of the Welsh Government. Elisabeth Whittle described Cadw as having a "somewhat special and guiding role" in the preservation of historic parks and gardens, since they are "an integral part of Welsh archaeological and architectural heritage". The register includes just under 400 sites, ranging from gardens of private houses, to cemeteries and public parks. Parks and gardens are listed at one of three grades, matching the grading system used for listed buildings. Grade I is the highest grade, for sites of exceptional interest; Grade II*, the next highest, denotes parks and gardens of great quality; while Grade II denotes sites of special interest.

There are 32 sites on the register of parks and gardens in Gwynedd. Three are listed at Grade I, 10 are Grade II*, and 19 are Grade II.

== Key ==
Grade	Criteria
I	Parks and gardens of exceptional interest
II*	Parks and gardens of great quality
II	Parks and gardens of special interest

== List of parks and gardens ==
List of parks and gardens
Name	Location Grid Ref. (Note: Sometimes known as OSGB36, the grid reference is based on the British national grid reference system used by the Ordnance Survey.) Geo-coordinates	Date Listed	Description / Notes	Grade	Reference Number	Image
Abergwynant	Arthog; SH6766917777; 52°44′28″N 3°57′38″W	1 February 2022	Park and gardens The park is bounded by the A493 road to the south-east, the River Gwynant to the south-west and the Mawddach Trail, a former railway route, to the north-west. The park is thought to have been laid out in the mid-nineteenth century at the same time as the garden with kitchen garden.	II	PGW(Gd)32(GWY)	Abergwynant
Boduan	Buan; SH3225638256; 52°54′55″N 4°29′42″W	1 February 2022	Park and gardens The park was probably first laid out when the house was built in 1736, and like the house it has undergone significant changes over the centuries. The gardens include three large fishponds with ornamental bridges. To the south of the house are two walled gardens built in the nineteenth century.	II	PGW(Gd)17(GWY)	Boduan
Broom Hall	Llanystumdwy; SH4116337017; 52°54′24″N 4°21′44″W	1 February 2022	Park and gardens The park, of about 30 acres (12 ha), lies mainly to the south and south-west of the house and gardens and is separated from them by a ha-ha. The park and gardens were laid out when the house was built (1779–1782), however, the gardens were later modified with the addition of terracing and the park has been enlarged.	II	PGW(Gd)22(GWY)	Broom Hall
Bryn Bras Castle	Llanrug; SH5443962496; 53°08′22″N 4°10′35″W	1 February 2022	Gardens The house was built in the 1830s and it is thought that the gardens were laid out at the same time. To the south-east of the house is the water garden with a series of ponds. The gardens to the east of the house consists of semi-formal lawns beyond which is woodland. The kitchen garden was repurposed as a knot garden in the 1920s.	II	PGW(Gd)41(GWY)	a country house set within woodland
Bryn Gwynant	Beddgelert; SH6404051344; 53°02′30″N 4°01′41″W	1 February 2022	Park and gardens The former kitchen garden (now a car park) is to the west of the house. Another kitchen garden may also have existed behind the house in what is now the enclosed orchard. Beyond the orchard is a Japanese garden which, along with the park, is probably contemporary with the house built in the 1830s.	II	PGW(Gd)20(GWY)	Bryn Gwynant
Bryn-y-Neuadd	Llanfairfechan; SH6746774581; 53°15′05″N 3°59′12″W	1 February 2022	Park and gardens The landscape park with formal Italianate garden was laid out by Edward Milner in the mid-nineteenth century. The house was demolished in the 1960s and although the park is now covered with the buildings of the hospital, which opened in 1971, the original layout survives, as do the formal garden and kitchen garden.	II	PGW(Gd)3(CON)	Bryn-y-Neuadd
Cefnamwlch	Tudweiliog; SH2343635529; 52°53′16″N 4°37′29″W	1 February 2022	Gardens The house is situated within woodland which provides a sheltered microclimate for the area around the house and the walled garden to its north which probably dates to the 1820s. The registered area includes the drives approaching the house from the north and south, both with lodges, and the former drive from the south-east.	II	PGW(Gd)23(GWY)	Cefnamwlch
Cors-y-Gedol	Dyffryn Ardudwy; SH5954422663; 52°46′58″N 4°04′58″W	1 February 2022	Park and gardens The kitchen garden may be contemporary with the gentry house, the earliest part of which dates from 1576 and which is approached by a drive flanked by a lime avenue of c. 1735–1740. The park was laid out in, or possibly before, the eighteenth century.	II	PGW(Gd)27(GWY)	Cors-y-Gedol
Craflwyn	Beddgelert; SH6001049116; 53°01′15″N 4°05′14″W	1 February 2022	Park and garden The present park was laid out at the same time as the house was remodelled in the 1870s. A walled orchard and walled kitchen garden lie to the north of the gardens and pleasure grounds which are mainly to the west and north of the house.	II	PGW(Gd)21(GWY)	Craflwyn
Dolmelynllyn	Ganllwyd; SH7244823959; 52°47′52″N 3°53′31″W	1 February 2022	Park and gardens The site is bounded on its eastern side by the Afon Mawddach and divided from north to south by the A470 road. The land by the river is agricultural and the house and main area of parkland lie on the opposite side of the road. The gardens around the house consist of lawns and a series of terraces that date from the second half of the nineteenth century.	II	PGW(Gd)33(GWY)	Dolmelynllyn
Former Nuclear Power Station at Trawsfynydd: Dragon Square and Dame Sylvia Crowe Garden	Maentwrog; SH6907038097; 52°55′26″N 3°56′52″W	1 February 2022	Gardens The registered area consists of two gardens designed by Sylvia Crowe between 1959 and 1965 as part of a larger scheme of landscaping for the former nuclear power station at Trawsfynydd.	II*	PGW(Gd)64(GWY)	Former Nuclear Power Station at Trawsfynydd: Dragon Square and Dame Sylvia Crowe Garden
Glan-y-Mawddach	Barmouth; SH6284416702; 52°43′49″N 4°01′53″W	1 February 2022	Woodland garden The gardens of around 30 acres (12 ha) were developed in the early twentieth century with further planting taking place from the 1940s to 1960s. A network of paths connects a number of individual gardens whose influences include Arts and Crafts, Italian and Japanese Gardens. The long raised terrace adjoining the house and the summer house are both of c. 1910 and are both Grade II listed.	II*	PGW(Gd)62(GWY)	
Glasfryn	Llanystumdwy; SH4015042423; 52°57′18″N 4°22′47″W	1 February 2022	Park and gardens The walled park was laid out in the 1790s, with the house at its centre. Since this time the estate has been enlarged with land beyond the wall being incorporated into the park, and the gardens expanded within parts of the original park. The main landscape feature is a natural lake, Llyn Glasfryn, to the south of the parkland.	II	PGW(Gd)24(GWY)	Glasfryn
Glyn Cywarch	Talsarnau; SH6058533960; 52°53′05″N 4°04′20″W	1 February 2022	Park and gardens The park and oldest parts of the gardens are contemporary with the house of c. 1616. The house, semi-formal garden and walled kitchen garden are to the north of the estate. In the centre of the park is a lookout tower built in 1881 from which there are panoramic views from Harlech Castle to the Dwyryd Estuary.	II*	PGW(Gd)28(GWY)	Glyn Cywarch
Glynllifon	Llandwrog; SH4588255029; 53°04′12″N 4°18′02″W	1 February 2022	Park and gardens Cadw describes Glynllifon as "an outstanding and extensive eighteenth and nineteenth-century park and pleasure ground". The Afon Llifon flows through the estate and its valley provides a setting for the features of the gardens and pleasure grounds including caves and grottoes, a boathouse and numerous bridges.	I	PGW(Gd)39(GWY)	a brick boathouse with a tower
Morfa Common Park	Caernarfon; SH4845261669; 53°07′49″N 4°15′55″W	1 February 2022	Public Park The park was laid out by 1888 and retains much of its original layout. The main area has a network of paths and a circular walk around its main feature, an irregularly-shaped artificial lake. The north-east of the park is used for sports grounds.	II	PGW(Gd)38(GWY)	Morfa Common Park
Nannau	Llanelltyd; SH7391620571; 52°46′04″N 3°52′08″W	1 February 2022	Park and gardens The late eighteenth-century landscape park contains an earlier walled deer park to the south of the 1790s house. There were two kitchen gardens at Nannau, the older of these was in the south of the estate. It appears to have been superseded from around 1838 by one closer to the house and home farm, the internal layout of which has since been mostly removed.	II*	PGW(Gd)34(GWY)	a 3-storey Georgian-style house
Panorama Walk, Barmouth	Barmouth; SH6276616679; 52°43′48″N 4°01′57″W	1 February 2022	Walk The footpath was developed in the nineteenth century take advantage of the natural scenery and views of the Mawddach Estuary and Cardigan Bay. The walk incorporates an area of woodland that was formerly pleasure grounds thought to have been laid out in the early twentieth century.	II	PGW(Gd)26(GWY)	Panorama Walk, Barmouth
Parc	Llanfrothen; SH6257243955; 52°58′30″N 4°02′49″W	1 February 2022	Park and gardens The main gardens were probably laid out in the seventeenth century and feature several stone-built terraces. The gardens, together with the house and farm buildings, are centrally located within the rectangular walled park.	II*	PGW(Gd)35(GWY)	Parc
Peniarth	Llanegryn; SH6104305574; 52°37′47″N 4°03′12″W	1 February 2022	Park and gardens The pleasure grounds around the house are within an eighteenth-century landscape park. The kitchen garden lies to the north-west of the house and is thought to have been built between 1820 and 1850. The registered area includes the former main drive to the south of the River Dysynni.	II*	PGW(Gd)36(GWY)	
Penmaenuchaf	Dolgellau; SH6987318375; 52°44′49″N 3°55′41″W	1 February 2022	Park and gardens The nineteenth-century woodland park is bounded to the north by the A493 road. The terrace around the house and the viewing terrace were present in 1888. The main garden terraces, east of the house, were added by 1901. The kitchen garden, to the north-west of the house, was probably moved to its present location as part of the redevelopment of the gardens in the early twentieth century.	II	PGW(Gd)37(GWY)	Penmaenuchaf
Penrhyn Castle	Llandygai; SH6014571942; 53°13′33″N 4°05′43″W	1 February 2022	Park and gardens Well-preserved gardens, consisting mostly informal lawns, lie around the early nineteenth-century castle which is located centrally within a walled park. The walled flower garden to the west of the house was laid out in the second half of the nineteenth century.	II*	PGW(Gd)40(GWY)	a formal ornamental garden
Plas Bodegroes	Llannor; SH3533835352; 52°53′24″N 4°26′52″W	1 February 2022	Park and gardens The gardens and surrounding park were probably laid out when the country house (now a hotel) was built in the 1780s. To the south-west of the house is a lawn beyond which is the main feature of the garden, a 400-metre-long (1,300 ft) beech avenue.	II	PGW(Gd)15(GWY)	Plas Bodegroes
Plas Brondanw	Llanfrothen; SH6153742228; 52°57′33″N 4°03′42″W	1 February 2022	Park and garden The garden has a highly architectural design and was laid out mainly in the 1920s and 1930s by Clough Williams-Ellis who inherited the house in 1908. The folly tower in the south of the estate was erected in c. 1920 as wedding present for Clough and Amabel Williams-Ellis who married in 1915.	I	PGW(Gd)30(GWY)	Plas Brondanw
Plas Gwynant	Beddgelert; SH6289150513; 53°02′02″N 4°02′42″W	1 February 2022	Park and gardens The park, which was laid out in the early nineteenth century, is divided by the Afon Llynedno flowing east to west through the park to join the Afon Glaslyn on the western boundary of the estate. The house and surrounding gardens with semi-formal terraces lie to the north of the Llynedno along both sides of which is a riverside walk.	II	PGW(Gd)16(GWY)	Plas Gwynant
Plas Tan-y-Bwlch	Maentwrog; SH6487140788; 52°56′50″N 4°00′41″W	1 February 2022	Park and gardens The Ffestiniog Railway (built in the 1830s) passes through the park in a wide loop within which a deer park was created. The surviving layout of park and garden dates mainly from between 1869 and the beginning of the twentieth century.	II*	PGW(Gd)31(GWY)	a sloping lawn in front of a castellated mansion
Plas-yn-Rhiw	Aberdaron; SH2359128304; 52°49′23″N 4°37′06″W	1 February 2022	Park and garden The early seventeenth-century manor house and enclosed ornamental gardens are set in a partly wooded park. The restoration and planting in the gardens was undertaken by Keating sisters who purchased the estate in 1939 and later donated it to the National Trust.	II	PGW(Gd)14(GWY)	a garden with hedges and shrubs overlooked by a house
Portmeirion	Penrhyndeudraeth; SH5866237108; 52°54′45″N 4°06′08″W	1 February 2022	Gardens Portmeirion was designed and built by the Clough Williams-Ellis between 1925 and the 1970s. The peninsula to the west of the village was originally the informal pleasure grounds of the Aber-Ia mansion which Williams-Ellis acquired and converted into a hotel. The village consists of numerous listed buildings arranged around the central public garden.	II*	PGW(Gd)29(GWY)	the central piazza, in the background are buildings of various architectural styles
Rhiwlas	Llandderfel; SH9226837078; 52°55′12″N 3°36′09″W	1 February 2022	Park and gardens The landscape park was initially laid out by William Emes in the late-eighteenth century. The estate is bounded to the south and west by the Afon Tryweryn beside which is the now disused main drive which approaches the house from the south-west.	II	PGW(Gd)25(GWY)	Rhiwlas
Tan-yr-Allt	Porthmadog; SH5680540552; 52°56′34″N 4°07′52″W	1 February 2022	Park and gardens The house was designed and the grounds laid out in c. 1800 by William Madocks. On the lawn to the east of the house is a memorial to Percy Bysshe Shelley who stayed at Tan-yr-Allt in the 1810s.	II	PGW(Gd)18(GWY)	Tan-yr-Allt
Vaynol	Pentir; SH5336169303; 53°12′01″N 4°11′44″W	1 February 2022	Park and gardens The oldest of the garden areas is the terraced Elizabethan garden to the north of Vaynol Old Hall. The Italian water garden between Vaynol Old Hall and Vaynol Hall, and the rose garden the south-west, both date to the early twentieth century. The present park was laid out in the 1820s and is surrounded by a high stone wall dating from the 1860s.	I	PGW(Gd)52(GWY)	Vaynol
Wern	Porthmadog; SH5426140030; 52°56′15″N 4°10′08″W	1 February 2022	Park and gardens The gardens were designed by Thomas Mawson in the late-nineteenth to early-twentieth century with terraces and an informal water garden. The kitchen garden to the north-west of the house replaced an earlier structure in c. 1892 when the house was rebuilt.	II*	PGW(Gd)19(GWY)	Wern

== See also ==
- Scheduled monuments in Gwynedd
- Grade I listed buildings in Gwynedd
- Grade II* listed buildings in Gwynedd
