= Llanaelhaearn =

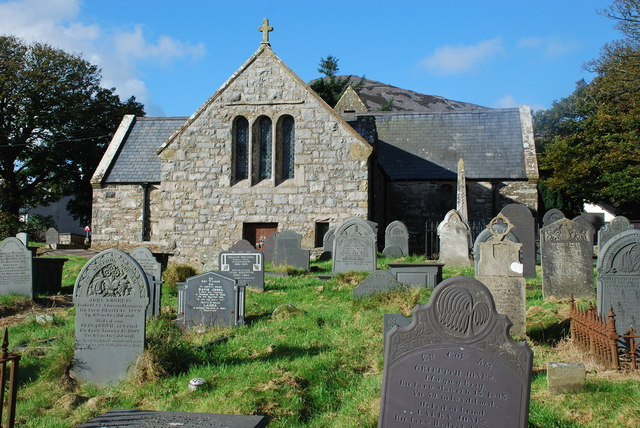
- St Aelhaearn's

- Location within Gwynedd
- Population: 1,117 (2011)
- OS grid reference: SH384448
- Community: Trefor a Llanaelhaearn
- Principal area: Gwynedd
- Preserved county: Gwynedd
- Country: Wales
- Sovereign state: United Kingdom
- Post town: CAERNARFON
- Postcode district: LL54
- Dialling code: 01758
- Police: North Wales
- Fire: North Wales
- Ambulance: Welsh
- UK Parliament: Dwyfor Meirionnydd
- Senedd Cymru – Welsh Parliament: Dwyfor Meirionnydd
- List of places UK Wales Gwynedd 52.976°N 4.407°W Map of the Trefor a Llanaelhaearn community

Llanaelhaearn is a village on the Llŷn Peninsula in the county of Gwynedd, Wales. Located in the community of Trefor a Llanaelhaearn (prior to 2024 called just "Llanaelhaearn") which also includes the larger village of Trefor and has a population of 1,067, increasing to 1,117 at the 2011 Census.

== Name ==
The town's name honours its patron saint and supposed founder Aelhaiarn (lit. "Iron Brow"), although it was long known by the corrupted name Llanhaiarn, leading locals to suppose there had once been a "Saint Elern" instead. (A nearby estate known as Elernion—i.e., "St. Elern's"—is thought to have a similar origin.) The official spelling of the parish's name was Llanaelhaiarn until 1957 when it was changed to Llanaelhaearn.

== History ==
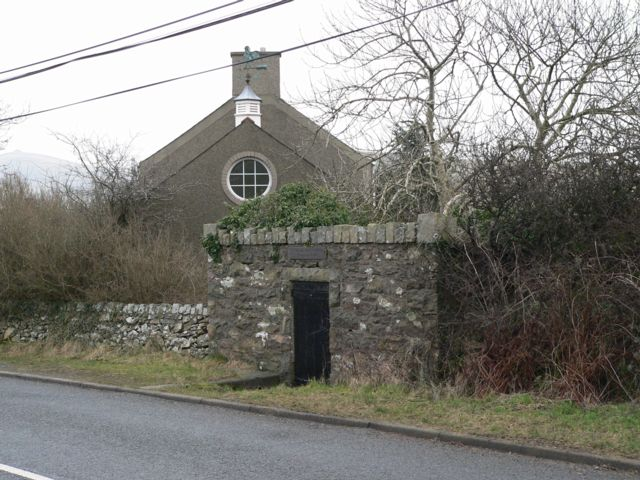
The modern stone enclosure around the well at Llanaelhaearn.

The settlement is traditionally credited to its patron saint, a disciple of Saint Beuno, who was supposed to have been resurrected nearby. Both Aelhaiarn and Beuno were noble monks from Powys who came north under the patronage of King Cadfan of Gwynedd. They settled in the area of Clynnog and Llanaelhaearn after Cadfan's son Cadwallon reneged on a promised grant elsewhere; his cousin, shamed by his behaviour, made good on his promises by donating his own land for their monastery. The nearby Afon Erch includes a stone whose petrosomatoglyph is traditionally taken to represent the marks of the kneeling Saint Beuno, worn through during his nightly visits to pray in the middle of the stream.

The church at Llanaelhaearn bears walls from around the 12th century and was last refurbished in 1892. It is listed as Grade II*. During expansion of the churchyard in 1865, workers discovered the Latin-inscribed gravestone of an Aliortus of Elmet, possibly indicating the existence of a religious settlement at the site before the arrival of Beuno's followers.

St Aelhaiarn's Well (Ffynnon Aelhaearn) was a major station on the northern pilgrimage route to Bardsey Island and much frequented for the miraculous cures associated with the "laughing" or "troubling of the water", an irregular appearance of upwelling bubbles throughout its basin. By the 19th century, the Llanaelhaearn well was surrounded with an oblong basin and stone benches; devotees would rest on them while waiting for the water to "laugh". A diphtheria outbreak in 1900, however, caused the local council to, first, enclose and roof the well and, then, to lock it away from the public. The well's ownership is not disputed but it still remains inaccessible; the present enclosure dates from 1975.

== Governance ==
An electoral ward in the same name exists. This extends to the Pistyll community. The total ward population at the 2011 census was 1,683.

The community was renamed from "Llanaelhaearn" to Trefor a Llanaelhaearn in 2024 to additionally represent the larger village of Trefor also located in the community.

== People from Llanaelhaearn ==
- Saints Aelhaiarn & Beuno (7th century)
- Sir David Hughes Parry (1893–1973), Vice-Chancellor of London University (1945–48)
