= Cynhaiarn =

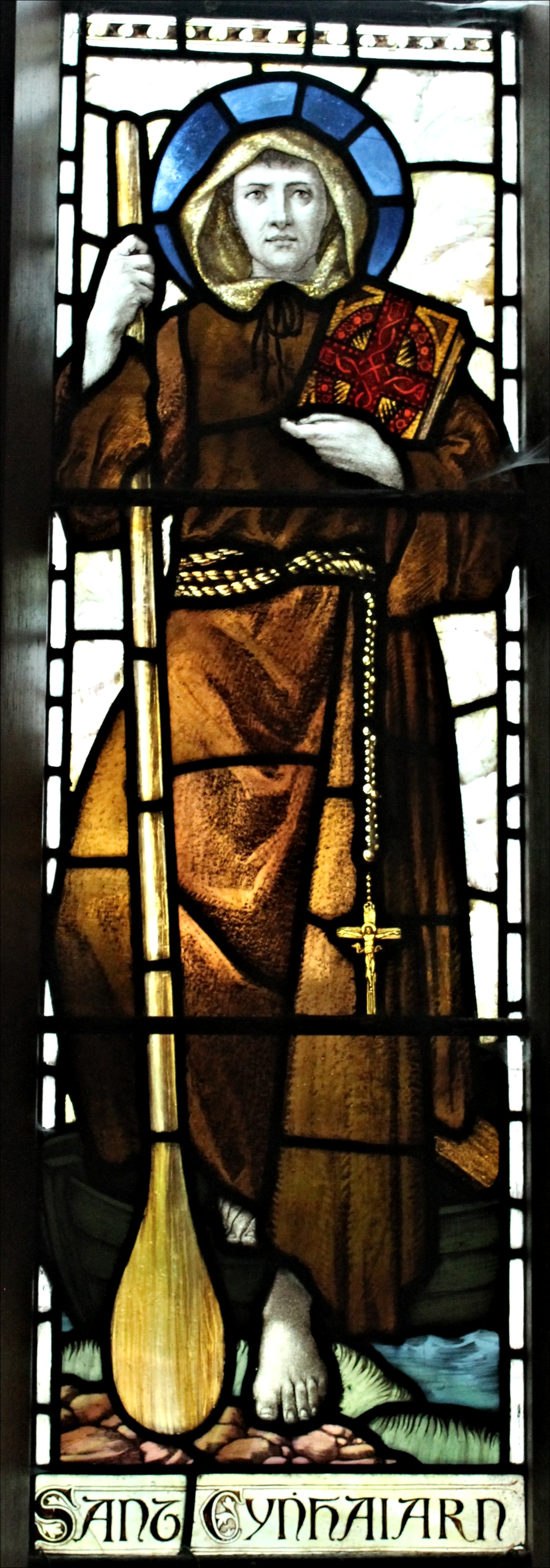
The saint portrayed in a stained-glass window in his church at Ynyscynhaearn

Cynhaiarn was a 5th-century Pre-Congregational saint of Wales, and the brother of Aelhaiarn.

Very little is known of his life, other than he was a prince of the Powysian dynasty descended from Vortigern, king of Britain, and brother of Llwchaiarn and Aelhaiarn.

Cynhaiarn was a cousin and disciple of Saint Beuno, sponsored by Saint Cadfan, and is remembered in the St Cynhaearn's Church, Ynyscynhaearn.
