= Fort Williamsburg =

Fort in Wales

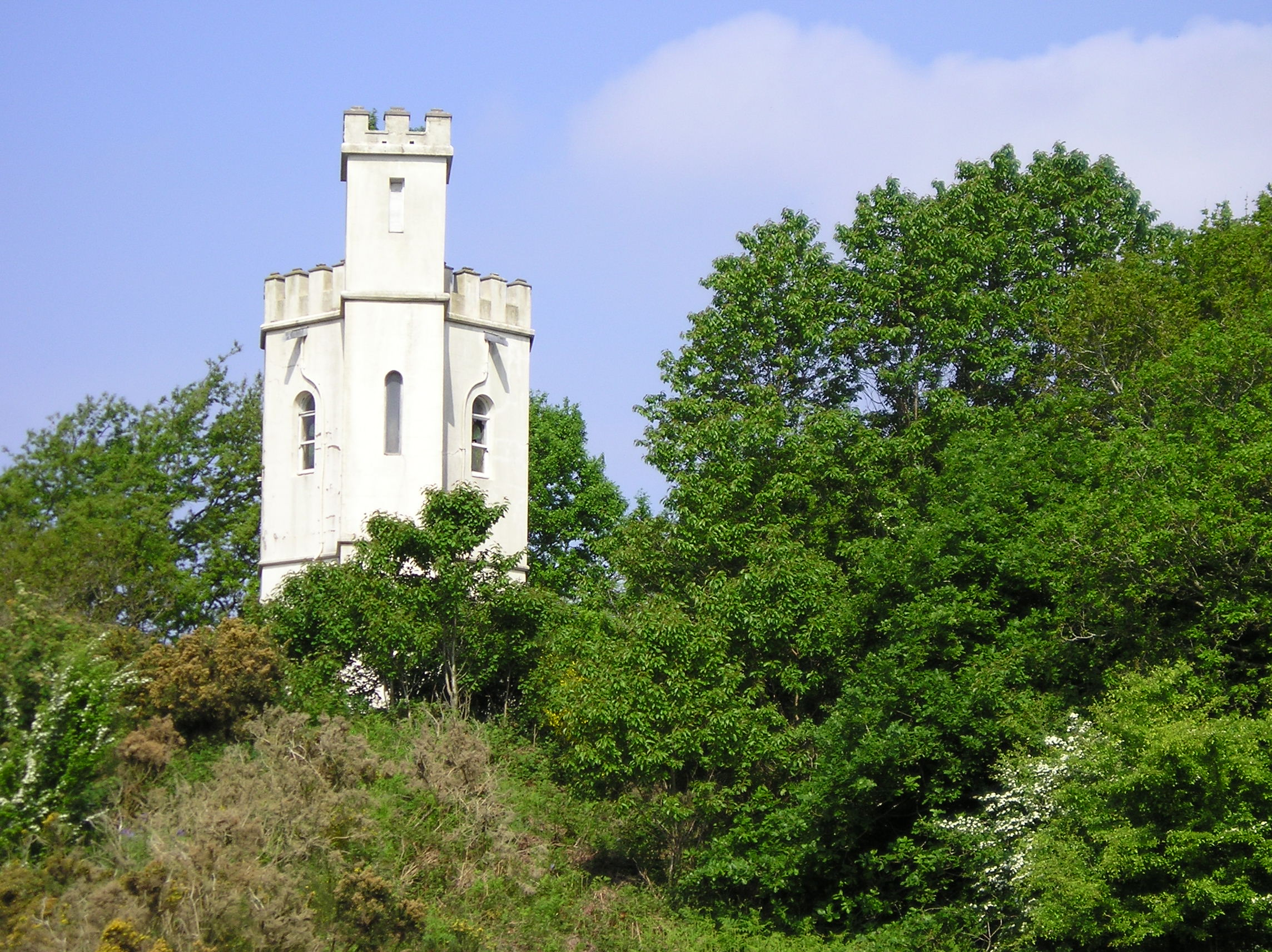
- "a rare and remarkable example of an 18th century private fortification"

- Location within Gwynedd
- 53.0705°N 4.2988°W
- Type: Fort
- Location: Llandwrog, Gwynedd, Wales

History
- Built: begun 1761, completed 1773-1776

Site notes
- Architectural style: Military

Listed Building – Grade II*
- Official name: Barracks at Fort Williamsburg
- Designated: 29 May 1968
- Reference no.: 20470

Listed Building – Grade II*
- Official name: Tower at Fort Williamsburg
- Designated: 29 May 1968
- Reference no.: 3791

Listed Building – Grade II*
- Official name: Magazine at Fort Williamsburg
- Designated: 29 May 1968
- Reference no.: 20465

Listed Building – Grade II*
- Official name: Gatehouse at Fort Williamsburg
- Designated: 29 May 1968
- Reference no.: 20468

Listed Building – Grade II*
- Official name: Armoury at Fort Williamsburg
- Designated: 29 May 1968
- Reference no.: 20469

Listed Building – Grade II*
- Official name: Outer Defensive Wall to Fort Williamsburg
- Designated: 29 May 1968
- Reference no.: 20467

Fort Williamsburg (Welsh: Caer Williamsburg) is a military fort in Llandwrog, Gwynedd, North Wales. It was built by Thomas Wynn, 1st Baron Newborough. Wynn was appointed Lord Lieutenant of Carnarvonshire in 1761 and began the construction of Fort Williamsburg in the same year as a base for the Carnarvon Militia. Seven structures within the complex are Grade II* listed buildings, while another is listed at Grade II. The fort stands within the park of Glynllifon, Wynn's country house.

== History ==
Thomas Wynn, 1st Baron Newborough (1736–1807) descended from an ancient Welsh family. His grandfather, Sir Thomas Wynn (1677–1749), married Frances Glynn, heiress to the Glynllifon estate, in 1700. Wynn followed his father in a political career that saw him elected as a Member of Parliament for Carnarvonshire in 1761 and appointed Lord Lieutenant of Carnarvonshire and Constable of Caernarfon Castle in the same year. Considered "a notable eccentric of his day", his passion was soldiery and he raised, largely funded, and commanded the Carnarvon Militia, as a local defence force, firstly against a feared French invasion during the Seven Years' War, and subsequently to counter an American invasion during that country's war for independence. To accommodate and support the militia, he constructed two forts on his Glynllifon estate; Fort Belan, on the coast south of Caernarfon to guard against naval attack, and Fort Williamsburg, south of the main mansion, a location "without relevance for actual defence".

Although Wynn enjoyed a considerable income, the costs of his "feudal and martial fancies" were enormous; he was reported to have spent £30,000 just on the building of Fort Belan; and by the time of the death of his first wife in 1782, he had endured a period of incarceration in a debtors' prison. To avoid his creditors, he moved to Italy where, by 1786, he was reported as "living in a very obscure manner", and proceeded to cause further scandal by marrying a 13-year old singer. (Note: Maria Stella Chiappini, Wynn's second wife, claimed to be the daughter of Louis Philippe II, Duke of Orléans. After Wynn's death, she married again, to an Estonian noble, Heinrich George Eduard von Ungern-Sternberg. She expended much time and money seeking to prove her ancestry and died in poverty in Paris in 1843. Her memoirs were published in London in 1914.) This led to attempts by the British authorities in Italy to have him declared insane. Wynn was finally able to return to England, where he died in 1807.

Wynn's heirs continued to live at Glynnllifon until the mid-20th century when the house was sold. In 1954 the estate was bought by Caernarfonshire County Council which operated an agricultural college at the site. The college closed at the end of the 20th century, and the mansion and parts of the estate were sold off. Numerous subsequent attempts at development in the 21st century failed and in 2021 the house was in the ownership of a Manchester-based property developer. At this time, Hebed, the Welsh archaeology council, described the, "bijou", Fort Williamsburg as "in poor condition and closed [with] an uncertain future". (Note: When Sir Ralph Payne-Gallwey, sportsman, military commentator and author of a biography of the second Lady Newborough, visited Williamsburg and Fort Belan in 1907, he found both in a "perfect state of repair".)

== Architecture and description ==
Fort Williamsburg stands 0.5 of a mile south-east of Glynnllifon Hall. Richard Haslam, Julian Orbach and Adam Voelcker, in their Gwynedd volume in the Pevsner Buildings of Wales series, describe it as "the chief monument of the park". The complex consists of a gatehouse, a barracks, a magazine, and an armoury, together with a watchtower, all surrounded by a defensive perimeter wall, which is pierced by a tunnel that gives access from the parade ground to the tower. To the north-west of the site is a reservoir. The whole is encircled by extensive earthworks and a broad ditch. All of the structures are listed at Grade II*, excepting the Grade II listed reservoir. Cadw describes the fort as a "rare and remarkable British example of an 18th-century private fortification".

=== Gatehouse ===
Entry to the fort is gained by a footbridge across a ditch and through a gatehouse. Cadw suggests the design is less to a military specification and more akin to a "neoclassical garden pavilion". It is built of brick under a Welsh slate roof.

=== Barracks ===
The barracks are constructed of local rubble stone, of two storeys, to a horseshoe plan. The block is protected by redans and revetments.

=== Magazine ===
The magazine is a circular structure, constructed of rubble with brick dressings.

=== Armoury ===
The armoury exhibits one neoclassical and one "Gothick" frontage. It is also protected by extensive earthworks.

=== Watchtower ===
The watchtower gives wide views over the estate, and out to the Irish Sea. Of two stages, it is the complex's most prominent feature. At the time of Haslam, Orbach and Voelcker's survey in 2009, the interior had been much damaged by fire. It has since been restored but such 18th-century features as it may once have had have been lost.

=== Tunnel ===
The tunnel provides access from the parade ground to the tower.

=== Outer defensive wall ===
The outer wall is of rubble, and is again further protected by redans and revetments.

=== Reservoir ===
The circular reservoir is 19th century in date and provided a water supply for the garden's fountains and water features.

== See also ==
- Castles in Great Britain and Ireland
- List of castles in Wales
- List of gardens in Wales

== Sources ==
- Chiappini, Maria Stella (1914). The Memoirs of Maria Stella (Lady Newborough) by Herself. London: Eveleigh Nash. OCLC 5341689.
- Haslam, Richard; Orbach, Julian; Voelcker, Adam (2009). Gwynedd. The Buildings of Wales. New Haven, US and London: Yale University Press. ISBN 978-0-300-14169-6. OCLC 1023292902.
- Owen, Bryn (1989). History of the Welsh Militia and Volunteer Corps 1757–1908. Vol. 1: Anglesey and Caernarfonshire. Caernarfon: Palace Books. ISBN 978-1-871-90400-0. OCLC 264700961.
