= Council Offices, Caernarfon =

County building in Caernarfon, Wales

County Offices
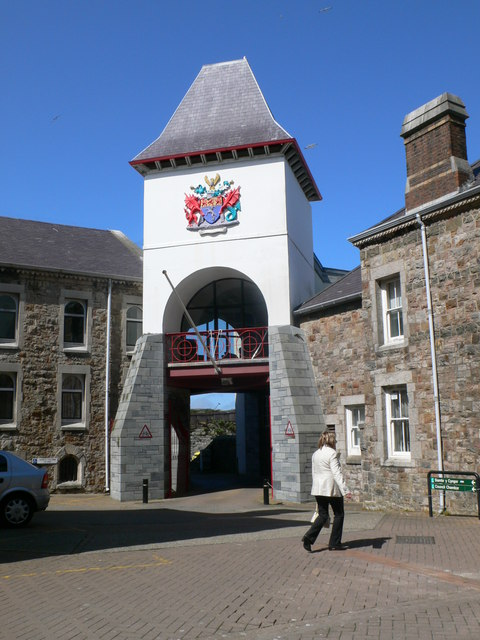
- County Offices, Caernarfon

- Location within Gwynedd
- 53.1404°N 4.2779°W
- Location: Caernarfon

History
- Built: 1869

Site notes
- Architectural style: Gothic style

Listed Building – Grade II
- Designated: 3 May 2002
- Reference no.: 26628

The Council Offices (Welsh: Swyddfa'r Cyngor) is a municipal facility at Shirehall Street in Caernarfon, Wales. The structure, which is the headquarters of Gwynedd Council, is a Grade II listed building.

== History ==
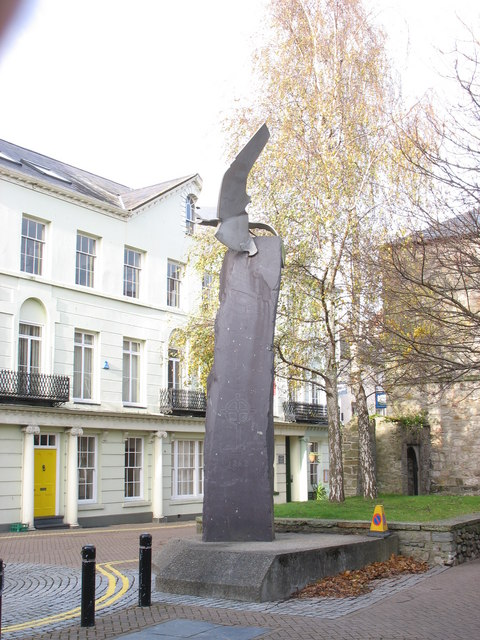
The memorial to Llywelyn ap Gruffudd

The current structure was commissioned as the county prison to replace an earlier gaol on the site which had been designed by Joseph Turner and completed in 1793.

The new building, which was designed in the Gothic style, was completed in 1869. The design for the entrance block involved a short frontage of just three bays facing Shirehall Street; the central bay, which was slightly recessed, featured a doorway flanked by lancet windows with a tympanum containing a quatrefoil above the doorway; there was a triple mullioned window on the first floor and a double window on the second floor; to rear of the entrance block was a short prison block which ran east-west and stretched back to meet a much longer prison block which ran north-south. Located to the north of the prison buildings was a 19th century residential property known as Gwylfa.

The site incorporated a medieval tower (known as the Hanging Tower) that once formed part of the town walls. The last execution in the prison, the hanging of the labourer, William Murphy, for the murder of his girlfriend, Gwen Ellen Jones, was carried out by Henry Pierrepoint at the Hanging Tower on 15 February 1910. The building closed as a prison in 1921 and was subsequently converted to create additional offices for Caernarvonshire County Council which was based immediately to the south in the old County Hall.

After the implementation of the Local Government Act 1972, the offices, by then known as the "County Offices", became the headquarters of Gwynedd County Council in 1974. A tower with an archway for vehicles, displaying the brightly painted new coat of arms of Gwynedd County Council and topped with a mansard roof, was subsequently erected at the north end of the long north-south prison block; this created a link, at first floor level, with the office facilities in Gwylfa.

A modern office block providing additional facilities was built between Castle Street and Shirehall Street in the 1980s. A sculpture of an eagle by Glen Hellman and Jonah Jones, which was commissioned by the county council in 1982 to commemorate the 700th anniversary of the death of Llywelyn ap Gruffudd, the last Prince of Wales before the conquest of Wales by King Edward I, was unveiled in a small courtyard on the east side of Castle Street in 1987.

On 1 April 1996, following implementation of the Local Government (Wales) Act 1994, the complex became the local seat of government for the new local authority in the area, Gwynedd Council.
