= Aelhaiarn =

Welsh confessor and saint

Saint Aelhaiarn
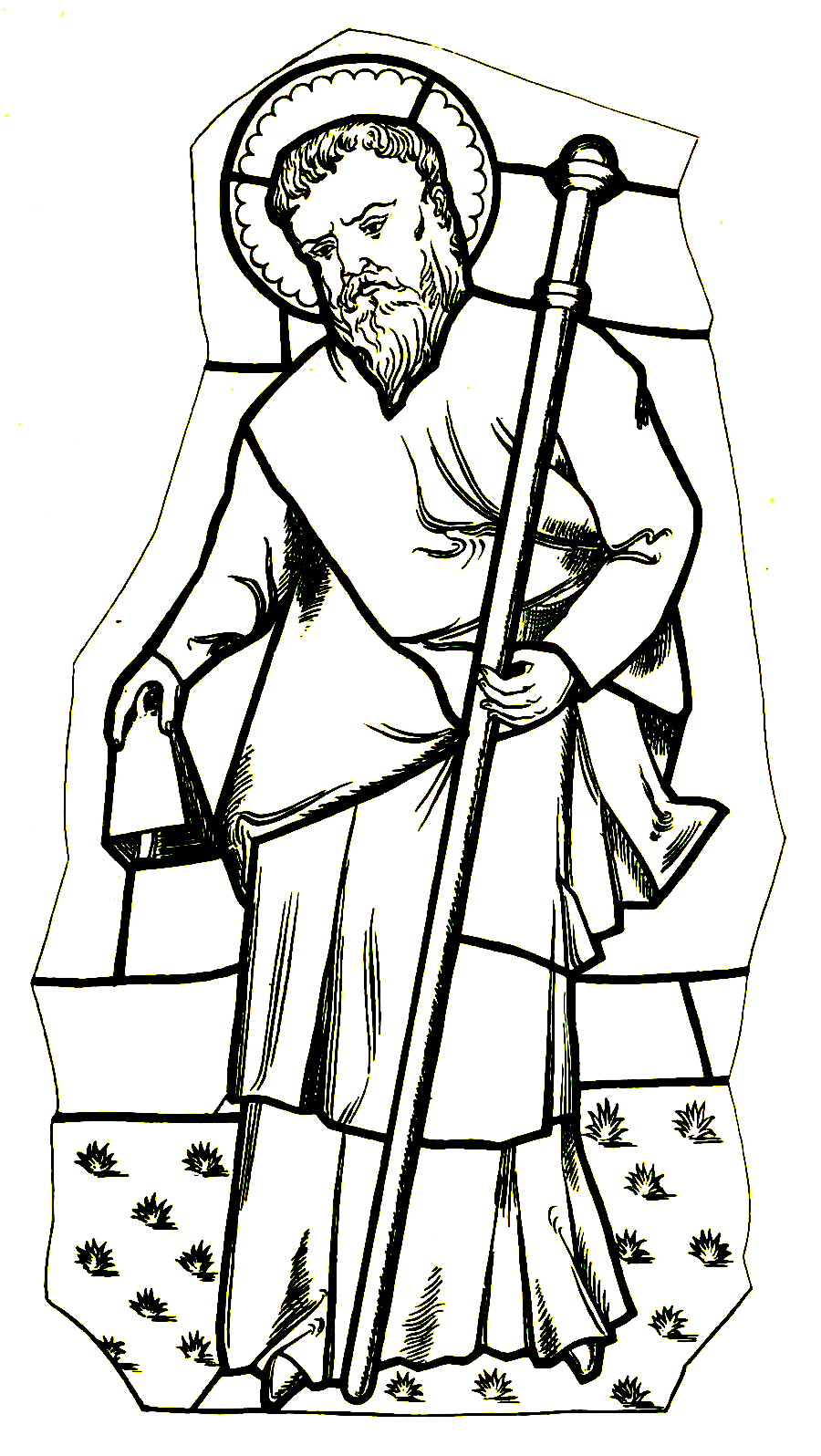
- Saint Aelhaiarn with a cowbell (from a 15th-century stained-glass window in Plogonnec, Brittany)
- Born: Powys
- Died: 7th century Llŷn
- Canonized: Pre-Congregation
- Major shrine: Guilsfield; Llanaelhaearn
- Feast: 2 November (lapsed)
- Patronage: Guilsfield; Llanaelhaearn

Saint Aelhaiarn or Aelhaearn (Welsh for "Iron Brow"; fl. early 7th century) was a Welsh confessor and saint of the British Church. He was a disciple of Saint Beuno. His feast day was usually observed on 2 November, although it is sometimes recorded as the 1st and is no longer observed by either the Anglican or Catholic church in Wales.

== Life ==
Saint Aelhaiarn is listed among the Bonedd y Seint (Genealogies of the Saints). He was the brother of saints Llwchaiarn and Cynhaiarn and son of Hygarfael (or Cerfael), son of Cyndrwyn, a prince of Pengwern, in modern-day Shropshire. The area of Cyndrwyn's control was centred on the Severn valley around Shrewsbury. Aelhaiarn was said to have been a disciple of Saint Beuno, who also a member of the dynasty and thus a cousin. Beuno's activity was sponsored by Cadfan and other members of Gwynedd's Cuneddan dynasty; Aelhaiarn seems to have accompanied him out of Powys to Edeirnion and thence to northeastern Llŷn.

== Miracles ==
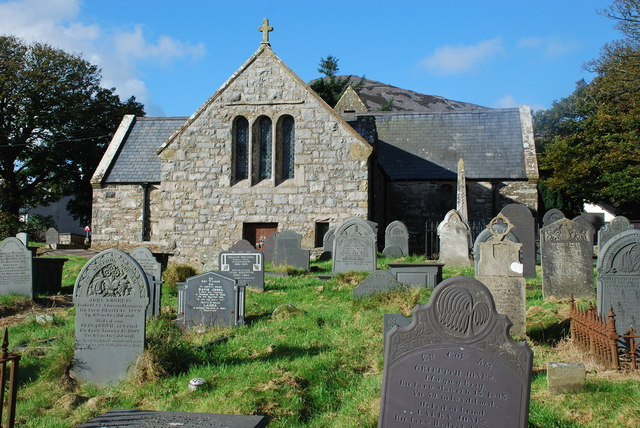
The c. 12th-century Llanaelhaearn church

The principal miracle associated with Aelhaiarn was actually performed by Beuno, who was said to have raised him from the dead (among six others). The 18th-century version of the story given to John Ray at Llanaelhaearn provides a folk etymology for Aelhaiarn's unusual name. It claimed that Beuno (Byno) was accustomed to disappearing from his cell near Clynnog every night to travel 4 miles (6.4 km) to pray on a flat stone in the middle of the Afon Erch. One night, as Beuno returned, he saw a man hidden in the dark; he then prayed that, if the stranger were on some good errand, he should attain it but, if his intent were ill, that some example be made of him. Immediately upon saying this, he saw wild animals appear from the forest and rend the man limb from limb. Beuno reconsidered when he discovered that it was his own servant who had been spying upon him. The saint set the bones and limbs together except for the bone beneath his brow, which was lost. This, he replaced with an iron bit from his pike spike. (Thomas Pennant, in his Tour in Wales, called the story "too absurd to relate" and didn't.) Baring-Gould, recounting it, compares it with Thor's restoration of his goats Snarler and Grinder in the Prose Edda.

After Llanaelhaearn had been established on the site of the servant's resurrection, Beuno charged him to oversee it but, "for a punishment", prayed that the bells of Clynnog would be heard throughout the village but not within Llanaelhaearn's church.

At the death of Aelhaiarn, his southern countrymen claimed his body; this was disputed by the monks of Clynnog. A fight was said to have broken out that continued into the night. At dawn, there were two coffins on two biers and one was taken by each faction. (A similar miracle is credited to Saint Teilo, whose relics were claimed by three separate churches.)

== Legacy ==
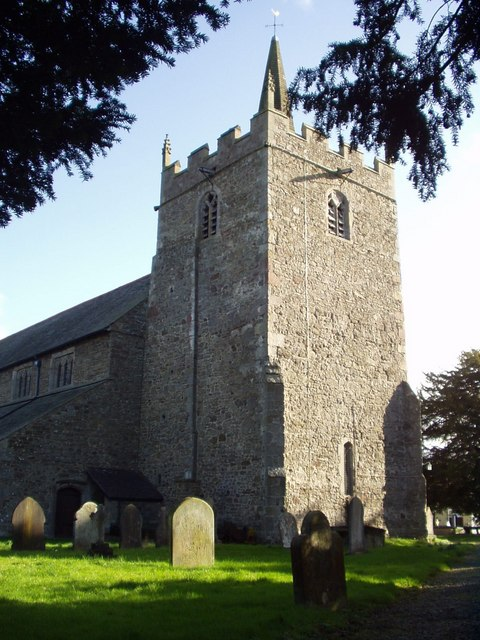
The 14th-century church of St Aelhaiarn at Guilsfield

Saint Aelhaiarn was separately venerated at Guilsfield (Welsh: Cegidfa, lit. "Hemlock-field") near Welshpool in Powys and at Llanaelhaearn on the Llŷn peninsula in Gwynedd. (The latter, however, was long known as "Llanhaiarn" through a corruption of his name; the nearby estate known as Elernion ("St Elern's") is thought to have a similar origin.)

The church at Guilsfield has been variously credited to Saint Giles (from the parish's name), to All Saints (from Aelhaiarn's nearby feast day), and to Saint Tysilio (from the local fair which was held on 8 November). Most of the present church dates to the 14th & 15th-century expansion of a 12th- or 13th-century core; it was refurbished between 1877 and 1879 and a small clock inset into the middle of its medieval tower. It is now a Grade I listed building. Its garden is also noted as an example of ancient yew trees set in a designed scheme.

The church at Llanaelhaearn bears walls from around the 12th century and was last refurbished in 1892. It is listed as Grade II*. During expansion of the churchyard in 1865, workers discovered the Latin-inscribed gravestone of an Aliortus of Elmet, possibly indicating the existence of a religious settlement at the site before the arrival of Beuno and Aelhaearn.

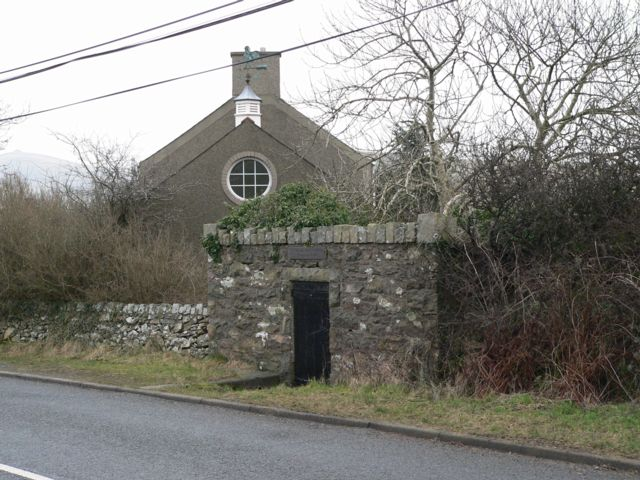
The modern stone enclosure around the well at Llanaelhaearn

Both locations included a holy well. The well at Guilsfield (Ffynnon Aelhaiarn) was formerly visited by parishioners for a drink on Trinity Sunday. St Aelhaiarn's Well (Ffynnon Aelhaearn) at Llanaelhaearn was a major station on the northern pilgrimage route to Bardsey Island and much frequented for the miraculous cures associated with the "laughing" or "troubling of the water", an irregular appearance of upwelling bubbles throughout the well. By the 19th century, the Llanaelhaearn well was surrounded with an oblong basin and stone benches; devotees would rest on them while waiting for the water to "laugh". A diphtheria outbreak in 1900, however, caused the local council to, first, enclose and roof the well and, then, to lock it away from the public. The well's ownership is disputed and it remains inaccessible; the present enclosure dates from 1975.

During the Middle Ages, the inland reach of Meirionydd also bore a parish named Llanaelhaiarn near modern Gwyddelwern in Denbighshire. It was united with Gwyddelwern in 1550 and the site of its chapel is now only marked with a yew tree. In the early 20th century, its local village was still named Aelhaiarn but it is now known as Pandy'r Capel ("Chapel Fulling Mill").
