= Penllech =

Coordinates: 52.888°N 4.650°W

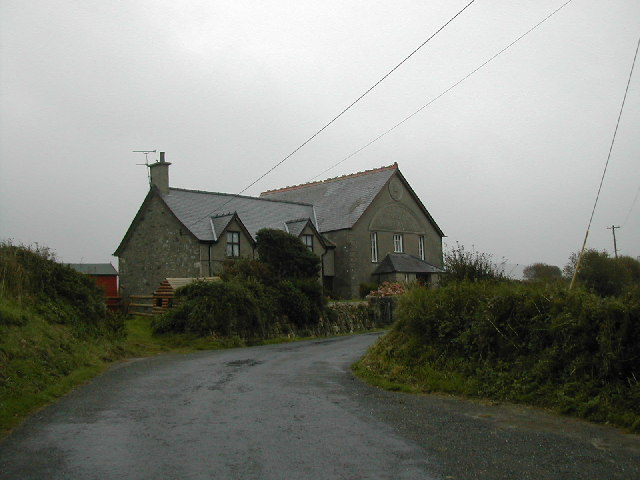
- Chapel at Penllech Bach

- Location within Gwynedd
- OS grid reference: SH218356
- Community: Tudweiliog
- Principal area: Gwynedd
- Preserved county: Gwynedd
- Country: Wales
- Sovereign state: United Kingdom
- Post town: PWLLHELI
- Postcode district: LL53
- Dialling code: 01758
- Police: North Wales
- Fire: North Wales
- Ambulance: Welsh
- UK Parliament: Dwyfor Meirionnydd
- Senedd Cymru – Welsh Parliament: Dwyfor Meirionnydd

Penllech is a hamlet and former civil parish in the Welsh county of Gwynedd. The parish was abolished in 1934, and incorporated into Tudweiliog.

== See also ==
- St Mary's Church, Penllech
