= Capel Newydd, Nanhoron =

Former chapel in Nanhoron, Gwynedd, Wales

Coordinates: 52.8484°N 4.547°W

Capel Newydd
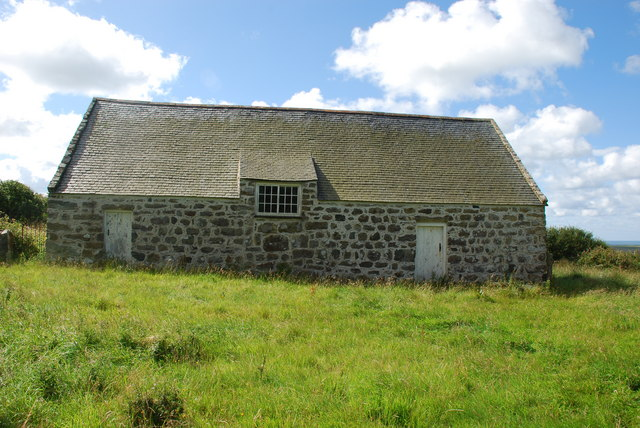
- "Probably the earliest nonconformist building in North Wales"

- Location in Gwynedd
- OS grid reference: SH285309
- Location: Nanhoron, Llanengan, Gwynedd
- Country: Wales
- Denomination: Independent

History
- Founded: 1770

Architecture
- Functional status: Redundant
- Designated: 1 April 1998
- Architectural type: Chapel
- Style: Vernacular
- Groundbreaking: 1770
- Completed: 1772

Listed Building – Grade I
- Official name: Capel Newydd
- Designated: 19 October 1971; 54 years ago
- Reference no.: 4303

Capel Newydd in Nanhoron, near Llanengan, Gwynedd, is probably the oldest surviving Nonconformist chapel in North Wales. The chapel dates from 1770–1772. Restored in the Victorian era and again in 1956–1958, its interior is a remarkably complete survival with an earthen floor and simple box pews. Now in the care of a trust, the chapel is a Grade I listed building.

== History ==
Nonconformist preaching began in this part of Caernarfonshire in the 1740s. In 1770, a Mrs Edwards of the Nanhoron estate donated land for the construction of a chapel. The chapel was completed in 1772, making it "probably the earliest surviving nonconformist building in North Wales". Restorations took place in the early 19th century and again in 1956–1958. By the late 19th century the chapel had been abandoned and, no longer in use as a place of worship, it is in the care of the Capel Newydd Nanhoron Trust.

== Architecture and description ==
The chapel is constructed of whitewashed rubble. The roof is of slate with stone corbels. It is described in the Gwynedd volume of The Buildings of Wales as "simple and barn-like", and may originally have been converted from an existing agricultural outbuilding. The interior walls are also whitewashed and stand on an earth floor. The interior fittings comprise plain box pews and a "simple" pulpit. The chapel is a Grade I listed building, its listing recording it as "exceptionally early ... with one of the very few surviving early chapel interiors".
