= St Mary's Church, Penllech =

Coordinates: 52.8775°N 4.6466°W

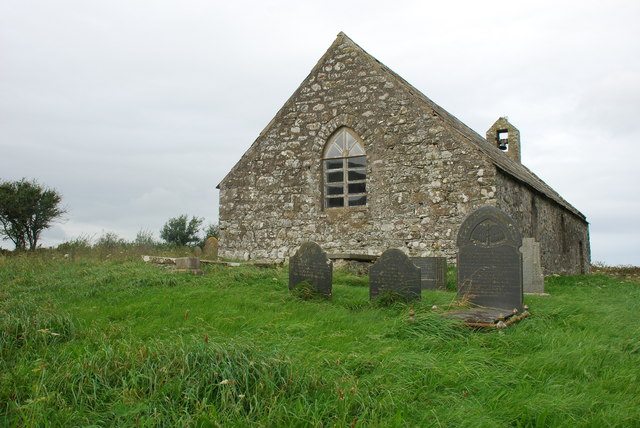
- St Mary's Church, Penllech, from the east

- Location in Gwynedd
- OS grid reference: SH 219 343
- Location: Penllech, Gwynedd
- Country: Wales
- Denomination: Church in Wales
- Website: Friends of Friendless Churches

Architecture
- Functional status: Redundant
- Heritage designation: Grade II*
- Designated: 19 October 1971
- Architectural type: Church

Specifications
- Materials: Stone, slate roof

St Mary's Church, Penllech, is a redundant church in the village of Penllech, Gwynedd, Wales. It is designated by Cadw as a Grade II* listed building and is under the care of the Friends of Friendless Churches. It stands adjacent to a farmyard in the Lleyn Peninsula and is on the old pilgrims' route to Bardsey Island.

== History ==
The church dates from the medieval period; the fabric in the east end dates from the 15th century. The church was much rebuilt in 1840, but rather than the Gothic-style restoration usual at the time, the interior retained its Georgian style. It was vested with the charity the Friends of Friendless Churches in 2009, which holds a 999-year lease with effect from 20 October 2009. Since then, repairs have been undertaken, including the reintroduction of wooden tracery in the windows in its original form, designed by Graham Holland.

== Architecture ==
St Mary's is constructed in stone with a slate roof. At the west end is a gabled single bellcote. The door is on the north side. In the north and south walls are two two-light windows with wooden Y-tracery. The east window is larger, also with two lights and tracery that is probably in concrete. There is no west window.

In the interior, the walls are plastered and the roof trusses are whitewashed. The floor is paved with quarry tiles. The fittings date from the 19th century and are made in pine that has been painted and grained. They include box pews, open back pews, benches, and a three-decker pulpit. The pulpit is octagonal, with a single candle-holder and a reading desk. Above the pulpit is a sounding board, also octagonal, and decorated on its underside with an eight-ray sun pattern. The font is medieval and consists of a rough stone bowl on a whitewashed pier. The bell is dated 1894.
