= Caernarfon Criminal Justice Centre =

Judicial building in Caernarfon, Wales

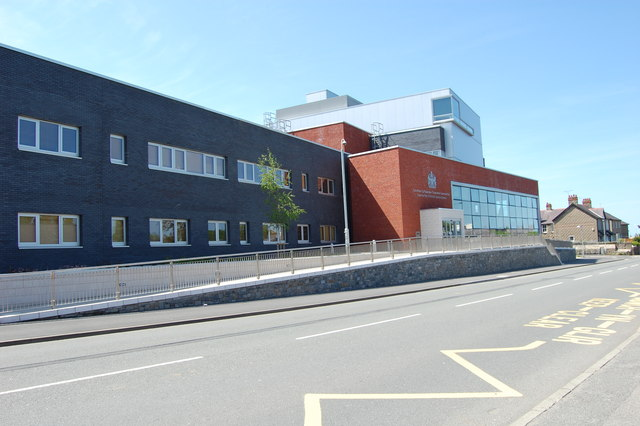
- Caernarfon Criminal Justice Centre

- Shown in Gwynedd
- 53.1403°N 4.2643°W
- Location: Llanberis Road, Caernarfon

History
- Built: 2009

Site notes
- Architect: Austin-Smith:Lord
- Architectural style: Modernist style

The Caernarfon Criminal Justice Centre is a Crown Court venue, which deals with criminal cases, in Llanberis Road, Caernarfon, Wales.

== History ==
Until the early 21st century, criminal court hearings in Caernarfon were held in the County Hall at Castle Ditch. However, as the number of court cases in Caernarfon grew, it became necessary to commission a more modern courthouse for criminal matters: the site selected in Llanberis Road had been occupied by Segontium School, which had dated from 1912 but which had closed in 2005.

Work on the new building started in May 2007, when the Lord Chancellor, Lord Falconer, cut the first sod. It was designed by Austin-Smith:Lord in the Modernist style, built by Balfour Beatty in dark blue and red brick at a cost of £12 million and was completed in May 2009.

The design involved an asymmetrical main frontage facing onto Llanberis Road. The plan involved two wings, one intended for the offices and the other for the courtrooms. The left hand section was built in dark blue brick and was fenestrated with single, bi-partite and tri-partite casement windows on two floors, while the right hand section, which was projected forward, was built in red brick and featured a grey stone-clad portico on the left with Royal coat of arms at first floor level above, and a large expanse of glazing on the right. Internally, the building was laid out to accommodate four courtrooms. The design was commended in the BREEAM Awards for Wales in 2009.

The building was subsequently sold to London & Capital Group and leased back from that company under a private developer scheme initiative.

Notable cases included the trial and conviction of Colin Milburn, in November 2022, for the murder of his long-term partner, Buddug Jones.
