= County Hall, Caernarfon =

County building in Caernarfon, Wales

County Hall
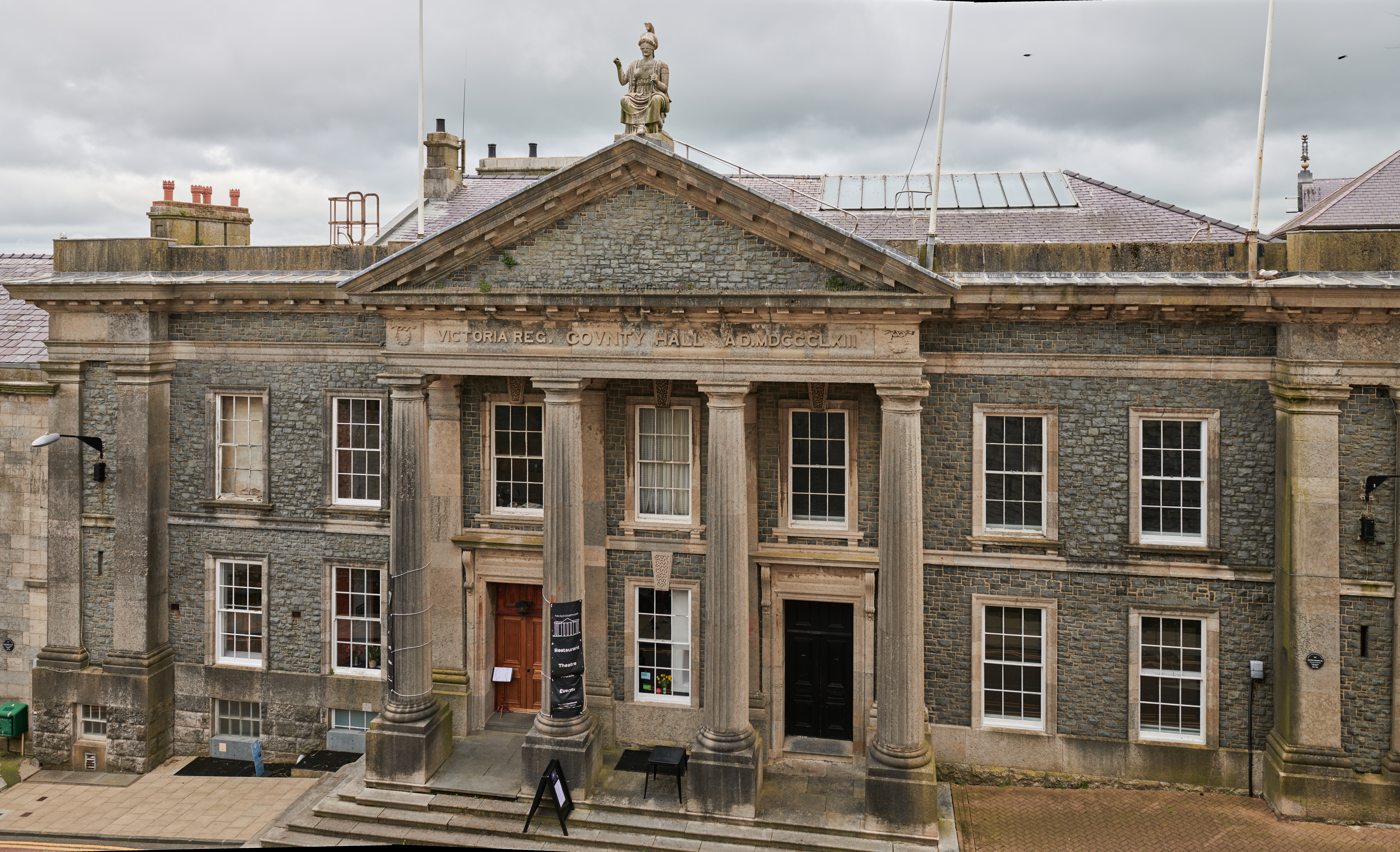
- County Hall, Caernarfon

- Location within Gwynedd
- 53.1397°N 4.2778°W
- Location: Caernarfon

History
- Built: 1863

Site notes
- Architect: John Thomas
- Architectural style: Neo-classical style

Listed Building – Grade I
- Designated: 8 October 1953
- Reference no.: 3828

County Hall (Welsh: Neuadd y Sir Caernarfon) is a former municipal facility at Castle Ditch in Caernarfon, Wales. The County Hall, which was the headquarters of Caernarfonshire County Council from 1889 to 1974, is a Grade I listed building.

== History ==
The current structure was commissioned to replace an earlier courthouse which had its origins in the justiciar's courthouse which was built in the south west corner of the town in around 1296. The remains of this earlier structure, which was located within the town walls, were preserved within the foundations of the new building.

The new building, which was designed by John Thomas, the county surveyor, in the Neo-classical style opened as Caernarvonshire Shire Hall in 1863. The design involved a symmetrical main frontage of seven bays facing onto Castle Ditch; the central section of three bays featured a tetrastyle portico with Doric order columns supporting a frieze inscribed "Victoria Reg County Hall AD MDCCCLXIII" ("Queen Victoria County Hall AD 1863") with triglyphs and a pediment. A figure of blind justice, carved by Robert Evans, was erected at the apex of the pediment. Internally, the principal room was the full-height council chamber which has a scallop-shaped plaster ceiling at one end of the room.

The building was originally used as a facility for dispensing justice, but following the implementation of the Local Government Act 1888, which established county councils in every county, it also became the meeting place of Caernarvonshire County Council. A memorial to the County of Carnarvon Boer War Volunteers who had died in the Second Boer War was unveiled in the building on 2 July 1904. Following its closure in 1921, the former County Gaol, located to the north of the County Hall was converted to create additional facilities for the county council. The former Prime Minister, David Lloyd George, chaired the quarter sessions in the building from 1929 to 1938.

After the county council was abolished in 1974, the old County Hall then became the home of the Crown Court and Magistrates' Court. The council chamber was converted to serve as the Crown Court at that time. After the courts moved to new Caernarfon Criminal Justice Centre on Llanberis Road in 2009, the old County Hall was acquired by a developer, Aaron Hill, who converted part of the building into an eight bedroom home, before putting it up for sale in September 2016. It was acquired by a musician, Moira Hartley, in February 2018; after securing planning consent in October 2018, she carried out an extensive restoration to the building and converted it into a concert hall and restaurant. The Crown Court became the concert hall while the magistrates' court and the witness room were both converted into dining facilities.

Works of art in County Hall included a bust of Thomas Bulkeley, 7th Viscount Bulkeley and a bas relief of Edward Douglas-Pennant, 1st Baron Penrhyn, both of whom served as Lord Lieutenant of Caernarvonshire.
