= Pentir =

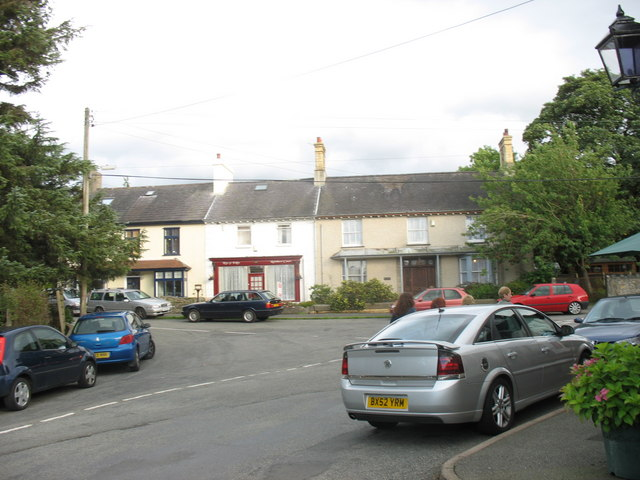

- Location within Gwynedd
- Population: 2,450
- OS grid reference: SH 5736 6698
  - Cardiff: 124.2 mi (199.9 km)
  - London: 204.7 mi (329.4 km)
- Community: Pentir
- Principal area: Gwynedd
- Country: Wales
- Sovereign state: United Kingdom
- Post town: Bangor
- Police: North Wales
- Fire: North Wales
- Ambulance: Welsh
- List of places UK Wales Gwynedd 53.180750°N 4.135899°W Map of the community

Pentir is a community and electoral ward in the county of Gwynedd, Wales. In the 2011 Census, the population of Pentir was 2,450 residents. 58.7% of them were able to speak Welsh. It includes the Penrhosgarnedd suburbs of Bangor, Glasinfryn, Caerhun and the hamlet of Pentir.

The Faenol Hall (Vaenol Estate) is a Grade II* Listed Building within the community, as well as several other buildings on the estate, such as the Chapel of St. Mary.

Pentir was historically part of the parish of Bangor. The Local Government Act 1894 directed that parishes could no longer straddle borough boundaries, and so the part of Bangor parish outside the boundary of the municipal borough (city) of Bangor became a separate parish, which took the name Pentir from one of the hamlets it contained. Rural parishes such as Pentir were converted into communities in 1974 under the Local Government Act 1972.

== See also ==
- List of localities in Wales by population
