= List of Roman-to-modern scheduled monuments in Gwynedd =

Gwynedd is a large rural county in North Wales. The northern half includes the high mountains of Snowdonia and the mixed farmland and hills of the Lleyn peninsula, which between them make up the former county of Caernarvonshire. The southern part of Gwynedd is the softer coastal and upland landscapes of the former county of Merionethshire. Gwynedd, the second largest county in Wales, has a total of 497 Scheduled monuments. That is too many to have on a single list article, so for convenience the list is divided into three. The 365 prehistoric sites are in two lists, covering 171 sites in former Merionethshire, and 194 sites in former Caernarvonshire. Below are the 132 sites dating from Roman to modern times, from the whole of Gwynedd. Gwynedd is a unitary authority comprising most of two historic counties. In 1974 it also merged with Anglesey, and the merged county was also called Gwynedd. Since 1996 Anglesey has been a separate county again.

There are 16 Roman scheduled sites on the list, almost all of which relate either to Roman military activity, or local defensive measures. By contrast, the 14 early medieval (Dark Age) monuments are all individual stones, either with carved crosses or other inscriptions or in one case a sundial. The 53 post-Norman medieval sites include sites included in the Castles and Town Walls of King Edward in Gwynedd World Heritage Site. Seven castles, 11 mottes, and seven enclosures are scheduled, as well as deserted settlements, two abbeys, five chapels and two holy wells. The 49 post-medieval sites include ten bridges, various sites relating to quarries, mines, engine houses, and railways, and five World War II defences.

The northern prehistoric sites are listed at List of prehistoric scheduled monuments in Gwynedd (former Caernarvonshire)

The southern prehistoric sites are listed at List of prehistoric scheduled monuments in Gwynedd (former Merionethshire)

Scheduled monuments have statutory protection. It is illegal to disturb the ground surface or any standing remains. The compilation of the list is undertaken by Cadw Welsh Historic Monuments, which is an executive agency of the National Assembly of Wales. The list of scheduled monuments below is supplied by Cadw with additional material from RCAHMW and Gwynedd Archaeological Trust.

== Roman to modern scheduled monuments in Gwynedd ==
Image	Name	Site type	Community	Location	Details	Historic County	Period	SAM No & Refs
	Enclosure & Settlement 400m East of Cyfannedd Fawr	Hut circle settlement	Arthog	52.6904°N 4.0223°W, SH634122		Merionethshire	Roman	ME086
	Round Hut and Cairns on NW Slope of Braich Ddu	Ring cairn	Arthog	52.6896°N 4.0208°W, SH635121		Merionethshire	Roman	ME100
View of Bangor and Penrhyn from the Roman Camp	Pier Camp	Earthwork	Bangor	53.2339°N 4.1276°W, SH581729	Strongly defensible earthworth hillfort. A 4th century Roman coin found on the site.	Caernarvonshire	Unknown	CN073
Dinas Emrys	Dinas Emrys Camp	Hillfort	Beddgelert	53.0222°N 4.0788°W, SH606492	Hilltop fort which tradition links with Vortigern and Merlin. Iron Age, Roman and Dark Age evidence has all been found. Present stonework probably, medieval.	Caernarvonshire	Roman	CN018
	Brithdir Roman Fort	Roman fort	Brithdir and Llanfachreth	52.7535°N 3.8209°W, SH772188	Roman fortlet which may also have had its own settlement. Now on the edge of the village if Brithdir.	Merionethshire	Roman	ME080
Looking NW across the site of the Segontium Roman Fort	Segontium Roman Fort	Roman fort	Caernarfon	53.1372°N 4.2662°W, SH485624	Regiment garrisoned here from 77AD to 394AD, a uniquely long occupation within Wales. It was the administrative centre for NW Wales throughout this period. Excavated buildings on view.	Caernarvonshire	Roman	CN006
	Lower Roman Fort	Roman fort	Caernarfon	53.1367°N 4.2702°W, SH482623		Caernarvonshire	Roman	CN094
	Bryn-Glas Roman Signal Station	Signal station	Caernarfon	53.1473°N 4.2401°W, SH502634		Caernarvonshire	Roman	CN188
	Llanfor Roman Fort and Camps	Roman fort	Llandderfel	52.9124°N 3.582°W, SH937361	(revealed by Aerial Photography)	Merionethshire	Roman	ME092
	Caer Gai Roman Site	Roman fort	Llanuwchllyn	52.8688°N 3.6686°W, SH877314		Merionethshire	Roman	ME018
	Dinas y Prif Camp	Enclosure	Llanwnda	53.0949°N 4.2961°W, SH463577		Caernarvonshire	Roman	CN030
Castell Tomen y Mur	Castell Tomen y Mur	Amphitheatre	Maentwrog	52.9299°N 3.925°W, SH705386		Merionethshire	Roman	ME002
	Tomen y Mur	Roman fort	Maentwrog	52.9276°N 3.9214°W, SH709384		Merionethshire	Roman	ME078
	Cefn-Caer Roman Site	Roman fort	Pennal	52.5832°N 3.9125°W, SH705000		Merionethshire	Roman	ME009
	Roman Bath-House, Tremadoc	Bath-house	Porthmadog	52.9392°N 4.1482°W, SH557401		Caernarvonshire	Roman	CN174
	Roman Kilns 225m SE of Pen-y-Stryd	Kiln	Trawsfynydd	52.8697°N 3.8918°W, SH727319		Merionethshire	Roman	ME071
	Dol-ddinas Roman Earthworks	Practice camp	Trawsfynydd	52.9241°N 3.8836°W, SH734379		Merionethshire	Roman	ME077
	Roman Practice Camp 440m WSW of Braich-ddu	Practice camp	Trawsfynydd	52.9274°N 3.9109°W, SH716383		Merionethshire	Roman	ME260
	Roman Practice Camps 190m W of Llyn Hiraethlyn	Practice camp	Trawsfynydd	52.9141°N 3.8733°W, SH741368		Merionethshire	Roman	ME261
	Roman Road Extending SE 650m from Llyn Hiraethlyn toward Glasgoed	Roman Road	Trawsfynydd	52.9135°N 3.8683°W, SH743368		Merionethshire	Roman	ME262
	The Senacus Stone (formerly in Tudweiliog, Dwyfer)	Inscribed stone	Aberdaron	52.8039°N 4.7113°W, SH173263		Caernarvonshire	Early Medieval	CN089
	The Veracius Stone (formerly in Tudweiliog, Dwyfer)	Inscribed stone	Aberdaron	52.8039°N 4.7113°W, SH173263		Caernarvonshire	Early Medieval	CN090
	Cross-Inscribed Stone in the Chapel, Bardsey Island	Cross-marked stone	Aberdaron	52.7641°N 4.7868°W, SH120221		Caernarvonshire	Early Medieval	CN141
	Inscribed Stone in the Chapel, Bardsey Island	Inscribed stone	Aberdaron	52.7641°N 4.7868°W, SH120221		Caernarvonshire	Early Medieval	CN142
	Sundial in Clynnog Fawr Churchyard	Sundial	Clynnog	53.0208°N 4.3656°W, SH414496		Caernarvonshire	Early Medieval	CN062
	Cross Inscribed Stone Near Capel Uchaf	Cross-marked stone	Clynnog	53.023°N 4.3417°W, SH430498		Caernarvonshire	Early Medieval	CN213
	Gesail Gyfarch Inscribed Stone	Inscribed stone	Dolbenmaen	52.9528°N 4.1746°W, SH540417		Caernarvonshire	Early Medieval	CN019
	Llystyn Gwyn Inscribed Stone	Inscribed stone	Dolbenmaen	52.9855°N 4.2626°W, SH482455		Caernarvonshire	Early Medieval	CN021
	Early Christian Inscribed Stone in the Churchyard, Llanaelhaearn	Inscribed stone	Llanaelhaearn	52.9764°N 4.4041°W, SH386448		Caernarvonshire	Early Medieval	CN084
	Part of Inscribed Stone Built into Wall of Churchyard	Inscribed stone	Llanaelhaearn	52.9763°N 4.4041°W, SH386448		Caernarvonshire	Early Medieval	CN085
	Inscribed Stone in St Cian's Churchyard, Llangian	Inscribed stone	Llanengan	52.8309°N 4.5314°W, SH295289		Caernarvonshire	Early Medieval	CN087
	Cross-Incised Stone in Llangybi Churchyard	Cross-marked stone	Llanystumdwy	52.9447°N 4.3402°W, SH428411		Caernarvonshire	Early Medieval	CN100
	Cross Slab Built into Farm Building Ty'n-y-Cae	Cross-marked stone	Nefyn	52.9404°N 4.5127°W, SH312410		Caernarvonshire	Early Medieval	CN180
	Tymawr Cross-Incised Stone	Cross-marked stone	Pistyll	52.9473°N 4.5023°W, SH319418		Caernarvonshire	Early Medieval	CN101
	Aber Castle Mound (Pen-y-Mwd)	Motte	Aber	53.2338°N 4.014°W, SH656726		Caernarvonshire	Medieval	CN007
	Medieval Homestead 400m SE of Maes y Gaer	Rectangular hut settlement	Aber	53.2307°N 3.9988°W, SH666722		Caernarvonshire	Medieval	CN137
	Enclosure & Associated Structures at Pen-y-Bryn	Enclosure	Aber	53.235°N 4.012°W, SH658727		Caernarvonshire	Medieval	CN218
Bardsey Island - St Mary's Abbey	St Mary's Abbey, Bardsey Island	Abbey	Aberdaron	52.7643°N 4.7877°W, SH120221		Caernarvonshire	Medieval	CN068
	Site of St Merin's Church	Church	Aberdaron	52.8498°N 4.7143°W, SH173314		Caernarvonshire	Medieval	CN171
	Long Houses, Enclosures & Field Systems, Bardsey Island	Rectangular hut	Aberdaron	52.7674°N 4.7908°W, SH118225		Caernarvonshire	Medieval	CN186
	Capel Anelog	Chapel	Aberdaron	52.813°N 4.7377°W, SH155274		Caernarvonshire	Medieval	CN220
	Long House South of Talarfor	Longhouse	Aberdaron	52.8241°N 4.6251°W, SH232284		Caernarvonshire	Medieval	CN318
	St Mary's Church	Church	Aberdaron	52.7934°N 4.7612°W, SH139253		Caernarvonshire	Medieval	CN381
	Llys Bradwen Medieval Site	Enclosure	Arthog	52.7055°N 3.9993°W, SH650138		Merionethshire	Medieval	ME022
	Cyfannedd-Fach Homestead	Platform house	Arthog	52.6955°N 4.0257°W, SH631127		Merionethshire	Medieval	ME101
	Tomen y Bala Castle Mound	Motte	Bala	52.9115°N 3.5955°W, SH928360		Merionethshire	Medieval	ME016
	Ty'n Twr	Building (Unclassified)	Bethesda	53.1734°N 4.0571°W, SH626660		Caernarvonshire	Medieval	CN219
	Hafod-y-Wern Long Hut	Rectangular hut	Betws Garmon	53.0922°N 4.2016°W, SH526572		Caernarvonshire	Medieval	CN307
	Ystrad Rural Settlement	Deserted Rural Settlement	Betws Garmon	53.0935°N 4.1746°W, SH544573		Caernarvonshire	Medieval	CN316
	Cored Gwyrfai Fish Weir	Fish weir	Bontnewydd	53.1228°N 4.3151°W, SH453607		Caernarvonshire	Medieval	CN334
	Castell Cynfal, Bryn Crug	Motte	Bryn-crug	52.5946°N 4.0462°W, SH615016		Merionethshire	Medieval	ME121
Caernarfon Town Wall	Caernarfon Town Walls	Town Wall	Caernarfon	53.141°N 4.2754°W, SH479626		Caernarvonshire	Medieval	CN034
Caernarfon Castle	Caernarfon Castle	Castle	Caernarfon	53.1394°N 4.277°W, SH477626		Caernarvonshire	Medieval	CN079
St Beuno's Well, Clynnog Fawr	St Beuno's Well	Holy Well	Clynnog	53.0188°N 4.367°W, SH413494		Caernarvonshire	Medieval	CN091
	Long Hut North of Cwm Farm	Rectangular hut	Clynnog	52.9887°N 4.3327°W, SH435460		Caernarvonshire	Medieval	CN309
Criccieth Castle	Criccieth Castle	Castle	Criccieth	52.916°N 4.2324°W, SH499377		Caernarvonshire	Medieval	CN015
	Criccieth Castle, Outer Bank Defences	Castle	Criccieth	52.9157°N 4.2338°W, SH499377		Caernarvonshire	Medieval	CN173
	Dolbenmaen Castle Mound	Motte	Dolbenmaen	52.9642°N 4.2251°W, SH506430		Caernarvonshire	Medieval	CN063
	Maes Coch Deserted Rural Settlement	Rectangular hut settlement	Dolgellau	52.721°N 3.8617°W, SH743153		Merionethshire	Medieval	ME196
	Settlement & Fields Systems above Egryn Abbey	House platform	Dyffryn Ardudwy	52.7617°N 4.0695°W, SH604202		Merionethshire	Medieval	ME122
	Eithin-Fynydd Platform House Settlement	Deserted Rural Settlement	Dyffryn Ardudwy	52.7749°N 4.0771°W, SH599217		Merionethshire	Medieval	ME202
	Deserted Rural Settlement South of Ffridd Olchfa	Deserted Rural Settlement	Dyffryn Ardudwy	52.7465°N 4.0598°W, SH610185		Merionethshire	Medieval	ME203
Harlech Castle at sundown	Harlech Castle	Castle	Harlech	52.8602°N 4.1091°W, SH581312		Merionethshire	Medieval	ME044
	Medieval Ecclesiastical Structure SE of Ty'n y Coed Cottage	Chapel	Llanbedr	52.8265°N 4.0882°W, SH594274		Merionethshire	Medieval	ME249
Dolbadarn Castle, Llanberis Pass	Dolbadarn Castle	Castle	Llanberis	53.1166°N 4.1143°W, SH586598		Caernarvonshire	Medieval	CN066
	Cwm Brwynog Deserted Rural Settlement	Deserted Rural Settlement	Llanberis	53.0901°N 4.1017°W, SH594574		Caernarvonshire	Medieval	CN315
	Rectangular Earthwork 110m NW of Coed Ty Mawr	Moated Site	Llanddeiniolen	53.1753°N 4.1629°W, SH555664		Caernarvonshire	Medieval	CN156
	Castell Llanddeiniolen	Motte	Llanddeiniolen	53.1677°N 4.1414°W, SH569655		Caernarvonshire	Medieval	CN197
	Llys Dinorwig	Enclosure	Llanddeiniolen	53.1463°N 4.1508°W, SH562631		Caernarvonshire	Medieval	CN223
	Pen-Ucha'r-Llan Ringwork	Ringwork	Llandderfel	52.9186°N 3.5805°W, SH938368		Merionethshire	Medieval	ME042
	Domen Ddreiniog	Motte	Llanegryn	52.6121°N 4.0737°W, SH596036		Merionethshire	Medieval	ME054
Cymer Abbey	Cymer Abbey	Abbey	Llanelltyd	52.7581°N 3.8962°W, SH721195		Merionethshire	Medieval	ME001
	Cymmer Castle	Motte	Llanelltyd	52.7585°N 3.8808°W, SH731195		Merionethshire	Medieval	ME150
Castell y Bere courtyard	Castell y Bere	Castle	Llanfihangel-y-Pennant	52.6583°N 3.9711°W, SH667085		Merionethshire	Medieval	ME023
	Pont Maesgwm Deserted Rural Settlement	Deserted Rural Settlement	Llanfrothen	52.976°N 4.0324°W, SH635440		Merionethshire	Medieval	ME193
	Castell Gronw Castle Mound	Motte	Llangywer	52.902°N 3.5921°W, SH930350		Merionethshire	Medieval	ME067
	Huts 90m N of Cil Twllan	Platform house	Llanllechid	53.1779°N 4.0403°W, SH637664		Caernarvonshire	Medieval	CN144
	Cwm Caseg Deserted Rural Settlement	Deserted Rural Settlement	Llanllechid	53.1774°N 4.0254°W, SH647664		Caernarvonshire	Medieval	CN314
	Ty-Newydd Mound & Bailey Castle	Motte & Bailey	Llannor	52.9166°N 4.4604°W, SH346383		Caernarvonshire	Medieval	CN096
	Castell Carn Dochan	Castle	Llanuwchllyn	52.861°N 3.7139°W, SH847306		Merionethshire	Medieval	ME049
	Tomen Fawr	Ringwork	Llanystumdwy	52.9139°N 4.3002°W, SH454376		Caernarvonshire	Medieval	CN031
	Ffynnon Gybi	Holy Well	Llanystumdwy	52.9456°N 4.3421°W, SH427412		Caernarvonshire	Medieval	CN037
Penarth Fawr, near Chwilog, Pwllheli	Penarth Fawr Medieval House	House (domestic)	Llanystumdwy	52.9132°N 4.3524°W, SH419376		Caernarvonshire	Medieval	CN086
	Tomen Las Castle Mound	Motte	Pennal	52.5845°N 3.9245°W, SH697002		Merionethshire	Medieval	ME043
	Inscribed Stone in Llanfihangel Traethau Churchyard	Inscribed stone	Talsarnau	52.8975°N 4.0902°W, SH595353		Merionethshire	Medieval	ME050
	Llidiart-Garw Platform House and Paddock	Platform house	Talsarnau	52.8784°N 4.0641°W, SH611332		Merionethshire	Medieval	ME112
Castell Prysor	Castell Prysor	Motte & Bailey	Trawsfynydd	52.9148°N 3.8487°W, SH757368		Merionethshire	Medieval	ME045
Bont Newydd	Bont-Newydd	Bridge	Aber	53.2282°N 4.0049°W, SH662720		Caernarvonshire	Post-Medieval/Modern	CN061
	Cwm Erch Copper Mine	Copper mine	Beddgelert	53.057°N 4.04°W, SH633530		Caernarvonshire	Post-Medieval/Modern	CN193
	Glasdir Copper and Gold Mine Mill	Mill	Brithdir and Llanfachreth	52.7857°N 3.8715°W, SH738225		Merionethshire	Post-Medieval/Modern	ME206
historic bridge known as "Pont Y Cim"	Pont y Cim	Bridge	Clynnog	53.0452°N 4.3263°W, SH441523		Caernarvonshire	Post-Medieval/Modern	CN053
	Water Balance Incline at Aberllefenni Slate Quarry	Incline	Corris	52.6746°N 3.824°W, SH767101		Merionethshire	Post-Medieval/Modern	ME185
	Gorseddau or Ynysypandy Slate Factory	Slate mill	Dolbenmaen	52.9681°N 4.1598°W, SH550433		Caernarvonshire	Post-Medieval/Modern	CN160
	Gilfach Copper Mine	Copper mine	Dolbenmaen	53.0069°N 4.1984°W, SH526477		Caernarvonshire	Post-Medieval/Modern	CN170
	Gorseddau Slate Quarry	Railway	Dolbenmaen	52.9858°N 4.1279°W, SH572452		Caernarvonshire	Post-Medieval/Modern	CN303
	Treforys Deserted Quarry Settlement	Settlement	Dolbenmaen	52.9865°N 4.1451°W, SH560453		Caernarvonshire	Post-Medieval/Modern	CN321
Pont Scethin	Pont Scethin	Bridge	Dyffryn Ardudwy	52.7922°N 4.0265°W, SH634235		Merionethshire	Post-Medieval/Modern	ME126
	Pont Dol-y-Moch	Bridge	Ffestiniog	52.9561°N 3.9592°W, SH685416		Merionethshire	Post-Medieval/Modern	ME039
Gold mine Mills	Berth-Llwyd & Cefn Coch Gold Mining Complex	Mill	Ganllwyd	52.7932°N 3.9035°W, SH717233		Merionethshire	Post-Medieval/Modern	ME119
	Hermon or Dolfwynog Copper/Gold Bog Kiln	Kiln	Ganllwyd	52.812°N 3.8716°W, SH739254		Merionethshire	Post-Medieval/Modern	ME198
	Cwm Heisian West Lead and Gold Mine	Mill	Ganllwyd	52.8343°N 3.876°W, SH737279		Merionethshire	Post-Medieval/Modern	ME204
	Pont Llanbedr	Bridge	Llanbedr	52.8203°N 4.1006°W, SH585268		Merionethshire	Post-Medieval/Modern	ME026
Dinorwig quarry	Dinorwic Quarry: Hafod Owen Winding Engine, Locomotive Shed, Main Waterwheel and Housing	Wheelhouse	Llanddeiniolen	53.1203°N 4.1154°W, SH585602		Caernarvonshire	Post-Medieval/Modern	CN163
	Dinorwic Quarry Barracks 'A' Incline	Barracks	Llanddeiniolen	53.12°N 4.1108°W, SH586601		Caernarvonshire	Post-Medieval/Modern	CN177
	Vivian Slate Quarry, Inclines, Walia & associated structures	Incline	Llanddeiniolen	53.1244°N 4.1141°W, SH586606		Caernarvonshire	Post-Medieval/Modern	CN198
	Dinorwic Quarry	Slate mill	Llanddeiniolen	53.1236°N 4.0966°W, SH597605		Caernarvonshire	Post-Medieval/Modern	CN337
Pont Fawr	Pont Fawr	Bridge	Llandderfel	52.9171°N 3.5155°W, SH982366		Merionethshire	Post-Medieval/Modern	ME027
	Dinas Dinlle Seagull Trench	Seagull Trench	Llandwrog	53.0831°N 4.3354°W, SH436565		Caernarvonshire	Post-Medieval/Modern	CN396
	Slate Gwaliau at Felin Fawr, Penrhyn	Wall	Llandygai	53.1769°N 4.074°W, SH614664		Caernarvonshire	Post-Medieval/Modern	CN297
	Ogwen Fish Weir	Fish weir	Llandygai	53.2404°N 4.0943°W, SH600730		Caernarvonshire	Post-Medieval/Modern	CN335
	Cegin Viaduct (Penrhyn Railroad)	Viaduct	Llandygai	53.2299°N 4.1098°W, SH592723		Caernarvonshire	Post-Medieval/Modern	CN380
Pont Llanelltyd	Llanelltyd Bridge	Bridge	Llanelltyd	52.7562°N 3.901°W, SH718193		Merionethshire	Post-Medieval/Modern	ME006
	Water Powered Chain Incline at Bryneglwys Slate Quarry	Water Power System	Llanfihangel-y-Pennant	52.6289°N 3.9319°W, SH693052		Merionethshire	Post-Medieval/Modern	ME186
	Alltwyllt Slate Quarry Incline	Incline	Llanfihangel-y-Pennant	52.6407°N 3.9503°W, SH681065		Merionethshire	Post-Medieval/Modern	ME205
	Rhosydd Incline, Drumhouse & Tramway	Industrial monument	Llanfrothen	52.9977°N 4.0013°W, SH657463		Merionethshire	Post-Medieval/Modern	ME142
	Corn Drying Kiln Near Carn-Gadell Uchaf	Kiln	Llangelynnin	52.655°N 4.0871°W, SH589084		Merionethshire	Post-Medieval/Modern	ME116
	The Holyhead Road: the Ogwen Pass	Road	Llanllechid	53.1276°N 4.0226°W, SH647608		Caernarvonshire	Post-Medieval/Modern	CN338
	Drws y Coed Copper Mine	Copper mine	Llanllyfni	53.0581°N 4.1707°W, SH546534		Caernarvonshire	Post-Medieval/Modern	CN162
Dorothea pumping engine	Dorothea Quarry Beam Engine	Engine house	Llanllyfni	53.0542°N 4.2435°W, SH497531		Caernarvonshire	Post-Medieval/Modern	CN165
	Dorothea Quarry, Pyramids, Inclines, Mill & Winding Houses, etc.	Engine house	Llanllyfni	53.0537°N 4.2393°W, SH500530		Caernarvonshire	Post-Medieval/Modern	CN199
	Pen-yr-Orsedd Quarry, Blondins and Associated Structures	Engine house	Llanllyfni	53.0635°N 4.2265°W, SH509541		Caernarvonshire	Post-Medieval/Modern	CN208
	Ty Mawr East Slate Quarry Winding Engine House	Engine house	Llanllyfni	53.0492°N 4.2407°W, SH499525		Caernarvonshire	Post-Medieval/Modern	CN300
	Blaen y Cae Slate Quarry	Unclassified site	Llanllyfni	53.0591°N 4.243°W, SH497536		Caernarvonshire	Post-Medieval/Modern	CN301
	Cloddfa'r Lon Slate Quarry	Slate mill	Llanllyfni	53.0564°N 4.2356°W, SH503534		Caernarvonshire	Post-Medieval/Modern	CN302
	Pont Tai-Hirion Old Bridge	Bridge	Llanycil	52.9424°N 3.7821°W, SH803398		Merionethshire	Post-Medieval/Modern	ME028
	Capel Gallt-Coed	Chapel	Llanystumdwy	52.9382°N 4.277°W, SH470402		Caernarvonshire	Post-Medieval/Modern	CN117
	Afon Cynfal Deserted Rural Settlement	Rectangular hut settlement	Maentwrog	52.9547°N 3.8597°W, SH751413		Merionethshire	Post-Medieval/Modern	ME190
	Afon Goch Deserted Rural Settlement	Longhouse	Maentwrog	52.9501°N 3.8582°W, SH753407		Merionethshire	Post-Medieval/Modern	ME191
Pont Minllyn, Afon Dyfi	Pont Minllyn	Bridge	Mawddwy	52.7106°N 3.6891°W, SH859138		Merionethshire	Post-Medieval/Modern	ME094
Dovey Bridge, Machynlleth	Machynlleth Bridge	Bridge	Pennal, (also Machynlleth), (see also Powys)	52.6005°N 3.8557°W, SH744019	Also known as Pont ar Dyfi	Merionethshire	Post-Medieval/Modern	MG002
	Cei Tyddyn Isa	Quarry	Penrhyndeudraeth	52.9348°N 4.0412°W, SH629395		Merionethshire	Post-Medieval/Modern	ME108
	Pen-y-Gwryd Pillboxes	Pillbox	Beddgelert	53.0799°N 4.0036°W, SH659555		Caernarvonshire	Post-Medieval/Modern	CN397
Dragon's teeth, Fairbourne beach defences	Fairbourne Anti-invasion Defences	Anti-invasion defence site	Arthog	52.6983°N 4.0571°W, SH610131	The tank traps stretch for some 3 kilometres (1.9 mi) along the beach	Merionethshire	Post Medieval/Modern	ME252
	Anti-invasion Defences 630m E of Cae'r-tyddyn	Anti-tank Obstacle	Brithdir and Llanfachreth	52.7396°N 3.7854°W, SH795172		Merionethshire	Post-Medieval/Modern	ME250
	Nant Ffrancon Anti-invasion Defences	Anti-invasion defence site	Llandygai, (also Capel Curig), (see also Conwy)	53.1252°N 4.0222°W, SH647605		Caernarvonshire	Post-Medieval/Modern	CN399
	Anti-invasion Defences 2000m NE of Cwmrhwyddfor Farm	Anti-tank Obstacle	Llanfihangel-y-Pennant	52.7036°N 3.8492°W, SH751133		Merionethshire	Post-Medieval/Modern	ME251

Scheduled monuments in Gwynedd, Wales.
=Roman =Early Medieval
=Medieval =Post-Medieval/Modern

== See also ==
- List of Cadw properties
- List of castles in Wales
- List of hill forts in Wales
- Historic houses in Wales
- List of monastic houses in Wales
- List of museums in Wales
- List of Roman villas in Wales
