= Scheduled monuments in Gwynedd =

Gwynedd, Wales

Gwynedd is a large rural county in North Wales. The northern half includes the high mountains of Snowdonia and the mixed farmland and hills of the Llŷn peninsula, which between them make up much of the former county of Caernarfonshire. The southern part of Gwynedd is the softer coastal and upland landscapes of the former county of Merionethshire. Gwynedd, the second-largest county in Wales, has a total of 497 scheduled monuments. That is too many to have on a single list article, so for convenience the list is divided into three. The 365 prehistoric sites are in two lists, covering 171 sites in former Merionethshire, and 194 sites in former Caernarvonshire. The 132 sites dating from Roman to modern times are included in a single list covering the whole of the county. Gwynedd is a unitary authority comprising most of the two historic counties. In 1974 it also merged with Anglesey, and the merged county was also called Gwynedd. Since 1996 Anglesey has been a separate county again.

== By age ==
=== Prehistoric sites ===
Over the county as a whole, there are 365 prehistoric scheduled monuments. One of the oldest is a stone axe factory. Over the whole of Gwynedd, there are 139 scheduled burial sites, including chambered tombs, cairns, mounds and barrows, dating from the Neolithic, Bronze Age, and Iron Age. A further 167 sites are 'Domestic', mostly Iron Age hut circles and enclosures. As well as several field systems, there are 47 defensive sites such as hillforts and promontory forts, again from the Iron Age.
- The northern prehistoric sites are listed at List of prehistoric scheduled monuments in Gwynedd (former Caernarfonshire)
- The southern prehistoric sites are listed at List of prehistoric scheduled monuments in Gwynedd (former Merionethshire)

=== Roman to modern sites ===
There are 16 Roman scheduled sites in the county, almost all of which relate either to Roman military activity, or local defensive measures. By contrast, the 14 early medieval (Dark Age) monuments are all individual stones, either with carved crosses or other inscriptions, or in one case a sundial. The 53 post-Norman medieval sites include the Castles and Town Walls of King Edward in Gwynedd World Heritage Site. In total, seven castles, eleven mottes and seven enclosures are scheduled, as well as deserted settlements, two abbeys, five chapels and two holy wells. The 49 post-medieval sites include ten bridges, various sites relating to quarries, mines, engine houses, and railways, and five World War II defences.

The more recent sites are listed at List of Roman-to-modern scheduled monuments in Gwynedd

Scheduled monuments have statutory protection. It is illegal to disturb the ground surface or any standing remains. The compilation of the list is undertaken by Cadw Welsh Historic Monuments, which is an executive agency of the National Assembly of Wales. The list of scheduled monuments is supplied by Cadw with additional material from RCAHMW and Gwynedd Archaeological Trust.
