= List of prehistoric scheduled monuments in Gwynedd (former Merionethshire) =

Gwynedd is a large rural county in North Wales. The northern half includes the high mountains of Snowdonia and the mixed farmland and hills of the Llŷn Peninsula, which between them make up the historic county of Caernarvonshire. The southern part of Gwynedd is the softer coastal and upland landscapes of the historic county of Merionethshire. Gwynedd, the second-largest county in Wales, has a total of 497 scheduled monuments. That is too many to have on a single list article, so for convenience the list is divided into three. The 171 prehistoric sites in historic Merionethshire (shown below), the 194 prehistoric sites in historic Caernarvonshire, and the 132 Roman to modern sites across the whole of Gwynedd. Over the whole of Gwynedd, there are 139 burial sites (67 on this list), including chambered tombs, cairns, mounds and barrows, dating from the Neolithic, Bronze Age, and Iron Age. A further 167 sites are 'domestic' (64 on this list), mostly Iron Age hut circles and enclosures. As well as several field systems, there are 47 defensive sites (20 on this list) such as hillforts and promentary forts, again from the Iron Age. Gwynedd is a unitary authority comprising most of the two historic counties. In 1974 it also merged with Anglesey, and the merged county was also called Gwynedd. Since 1996 Anglesey has been a separate county again.

The northern prehistoric sites are listed at List of prehistoric scheduled monuments in Gwynedd (former Caernarvonshire).

All 132 Roman, early medieval, medieval and modern sites for the whole of Gwynedd are listed at List of Roman-to-modern scheduled monuments in Gwynedd.

Scheduled monuments have statutory protection. It is illegal to disturb the ground surface or any standing remains. The compilation of the list is undertaken by Cadw Welsh Historic Monuments, which is an executive agency of the National Assembly of Wales. The list of scheduled monuments below is supplied by Cadw with additional material from RCAHMW and Gwynedd Archaeological Trust.

== List ==
| Image | Name | Site type | Community | Location | Details | Period | SAM No & Refs |
|---|---|---|---|---|---|---|---|
| | Afon Arthog cup-marked rock | Cup-marked stone | Arthog | 52.7002°N 3.9809°W, SH662132 | | Prehistoric | ME235 |
| | Afon Arthog standing stone | Standing stone | Arthog | 52.6993°N 3.9902°W, SH656131 | | Prehistoric | ME234 |
| Arthog Standing Stones | Arthog Standing Stone | Kerb cairn | Arthog | 52.7061°N 3.9955°W, SH652139 | | Prehistoric | ME105 |
| | Bedd-y-Brenin Round Cairn | Round cairn | Arthog | 52.6838°N 4.0216°W, SH634115 | | Prehistoric | ME102 |
| | Bron-Llety-Ifan cairns and cup-marked rock | Kerb cairn | Arthog | 52.6941°N 4.0237°W, SH633126 | | Prehistoric | ME242 |
| | Bryn Seward Standing Stones and Field System with Associated Cairns | Stone alignment | Arthog | 52.6863°N 4.0343°W, SH626117 | | Prehistoric | ME083 |
| | Craig Las cairn | Round cairn | Arthog | 52.7068°N 3.9534°W, SH681139 | | Prehistoric | ME239 |
| | Hut Circle (and Early Field System) on Bryn Seward | Unenclosed hut circle | Arthog | 52.6861°N 4.0367°W, SH623117 | | Prehistoric | ME085 |
| | Hut Circle South of Cyfannedd Fawr | Unenclosed hut circle | Arthog | 52.6861°N 4.0226°W, SH633117 | | Prehistoric | ME177 |
| | Hut Group 530m SSE of Cyfannedd Fawr | Hut circle settlement | Arthog | 52.6846°N 4.026°W, SH631115 | | Prehistoric | ME103 |
| | Llynnau Cregennen Standing Stone | Standing stone | Arthog | 52.7057°N 3.982°W, SH662138 | | Prehistoric | ME068 |
| | The Cregennen Cairns and Standing Stones | Round cairn | Arthog | 52.7035°N 3.9788°W, SH660132 | | Prehistoric | ME151 |
| | Tyddyn-y-Coed Camp | Hillfort | Arthog | 52.724°N 3.9349°W, SH694157 | | Prehistoric | ME008 |
| Waen Bant Standing Stone | Waen Bant Standing Stone | Standing stone | Arthog | 52.7001°N 3.9967°W, SH651132 | | Prehistoric | ME125 |
| Cerrig Arthur stone circle | Cerrig Arthur Stone Circle | Stone circle | Barmouth | 52.7502°N 4.0287°W, SH631188 | | Prehistoric | ME114 |
| | Ffridd Fechan Fort | Hillfort | Barmouth | 52.7405°N 4.0526°W, SH615178 | | Prehistoric | ME127 |
| | Hut Circle at Gellfawr | Unenclosed hut circle | Barmouth | 52.731°N 4.0465°W, SH619168 | | Prehistoric | ME179 |
| | Standing Stone S of Cerrig-y-Cledd | Standing stone | Barmouth | 52.7577°N 4.0124°W, SH642196 | | Prehistoric | ME139 |
| | Dolddeuli Standing Stone | Standing stone | Brithdir and Llanfachreth | 52.7972°N 3.7426°W, SH826236 | | Prehistoric | ME226 |
| | Moel Offrwm Camp | Hillfort | Brithdir and Llanfachreth | 52.7719°N 3.8548°W, SH749210 | | Prehistoric | ME021 |
| | Moel Offrwm Lower Camp | Hillfort | Brithdir and Llanfachreth | 52.7686°N 3.8573°W, SH747206 | | Prehistoric | ME035 |
| | Nant Helygog ring cairn | Ring cairn | Brithdir and Llanfachreth | 52.7515°N 3.7763°W, SH802185 | | Prehistoric | ME247 |
| | Tyddyn Bach Round Barrow | Round barrow | Brithdir and Llanfachreth | 52.7807°N 3.8607°W, SH745219 | | Prehistoric | ME212 |
| | Crop marks (revealed by aerial photography) SE of Pen-y-Sarn, Bryn-Crug | Enclosed hut circle | Bryn-crug | 52.6108°N 4.0632°W, SH604034 | | Prehistoric | ME106 |
| | Enclosed Hut Circle Settlement North of Coed Gwlyb | Enclosed hut circle | Dolbenmaen | 52.9265°N 4.1699°W, SH542387 | | Prehistoric | ME184 |
| | Llyn Gafr Hut Circle | Hut circle settlement | Dolgellau | 52.7082°N 3.9089°W, SH711139 | | Prehistoric | ME218 |
| | Llyn Gafr Standing stone | Standing stone | Dolgellau | 52.7102°N 3.9055°W, SH713142 | | Prehistoric | ME219 |
| | Maes Coch Hut Circles | Hut circle settlement | Dolgellau | 52.7211°N 3.8611°W, SH744153 | | Prehistoric | ME195 |
| | Tal y Waen Cairns | Kerb cairn | Dolgellau | 52.7318°N 3.9323°W, SH696166 | | Prehistoric | ME244 |
| | Berth Ddu Hut Circles | Enclosed hut circle | Dyffryn Ardudwy | 52.7839°N 4.0907°W, SH591227 | | Prehistoric | ME004 |
| | Bron-y-Foel West Burial Chamber | Chambered long cairn | Dyffryn Ardudwy | 52.8013°N 4.0667°W, SH607246 | | Prehistoric | ME065 |
| | Bwlch y Rhiwgyr cairn | Round cairn | Dyffryn Ardudwy | 52.7605°N 4.0359°W, SH627200 | | Prehistoric | ME237 |
| | Bwlch y Rhiwgyr, cairn 350m to SW of | Round cairn | Dyffryn Ardudwy | 52.7555°N 4.0414°W, SH623194 | | Prehistoric | ME238 |
| | Byrllysg promontory fort | Promontory fort - inland]] | Dyffryn Ardudwy | 52.7962°N 4.0839°W, SH595241 | | Prehistoric | ME064 |
| | Carneddau Hengwm Long Cairns | Chambered long cairn | Dyffryn Ardudwy | 52.7647°N 4.0566°W, SH613205 | | Prehistoric | ME007 |
| | Ceunant Egryn Enclosed Settlement | Enclosed hut circle | Dyffryn Ardudwy | 52.7652°N 4.0682°W, SH605206 | | Prehistoric | ME099 |
| | Ceunant Egryn Hut Group | Enclosed hut circle | Dyffryn Ardudwy | 52.7662°N 4.0599°W, SH611207 | | Prehistoric | ME154 |
| | Cors-y-Gedol Burial Chamber | Chambered long cairn | Dyffryn Ardudwy | 52.7848°N 4.0725°W, SH603228 | | Prehistoric | ME038 |
| | Cors-y-Gedol Settlements & Field System | Enclosed hut circle | Dyffryn Ardudwy | 52.7866°N 4.0642°W, SH608229 | | Prehistoric | ME128 |
| | Craig-y-Ddinas Camp | Hillfort | Dyffryn Ardudwy | 52.7878°N 4.0412°W, SH624230 | | Prehistoric | ME020 |
| | Dyffryn Ardudwy Burial Chamber | Chambered long cairn | Dyffryn Ardudwy | 52.7846°N 4.0937°W, SH588228 | | Prehistoric | ME003 |
| | Enclosed Hut Circle North of Tyddyn Mawr | Enclosed hut circle | Dyffryn Ardudwy | 52.7657°N 4.0904°W, SH590207 | | Prehistoric | ME159 |
| | Enclosed Hut Circle Settlement and Long huts E of Egryn Abbey | Enclosed Hut circle settlement | Dyffryn Ardudwy | 52.7601°N 4.0763°W, SH599200 | | Prehistoric | ME153 |
| | Enclosure near Bron y Foel, Moelfre | Enclosure | Dyffryn Ardudwy | 52.7974°N 4.0666°W, SH607242 | | Prehistoric | ME155 |
| | Fron-Galed Homestead | Enclosed hut circle | Dyffryn Ardudwy | 52.7815°N 4.0891°W, SH591224 | | Prehistoric | ME113 |
| | Hengwm Stone Circles | Stone circle | Dyffryn Ardudwy | 52.7717°N 4.0524°W, SH616212 | | Prehistoric | ME136 |
| | Hut Group and Enclosures on SW Slope of Moelfre | Unenclosed hut circle | Dyffryn Ardudwy | 52.7601°N 4.0763°W, SH620239 | | Prehistoric | ME152 |
| | Llecheiddior Round Cairns | Round cairn | Dyffryn Ardudwy | 52.7779°N 4.0599°W, SH612220 | | Prehistoric | ME055 |
| | Llecheiddior Stone Circle | Stone circle | Dyffryn Ardudwy | 52.7754°N 4.0603°W, SH611217 | | Prehistoric | ME129 |
| | Llwyn du Parc cairn | Cairn circle | Dyffryn Ardudwy | 52.7564°N 4.0545°W, SH614196 | | Prehistoric | ME240 |
| | Mynydd Egryn Ring Cairn | Ring cairn | Dyffryn Ardudwy | 52.7626°N 4.0524°W, SH616203 | | Prehistoric | ME156 |
| | Mynydd Egryn Settlement | Enclosed hut circle | Dyffryn Ardudwy | 52.7626°N 4.0519°W, SH616203 | | Prehistoric | ME157 |
| The entrance to the Pen y Dinas Iron Age Fort | Pen y Ddinas Camp | Hillfort | Dyffryn Ardudwy | 52.7673°N 4.0676°W, SH606208 | | Prehistoric | ME076 |
| | Pen y Dinas Cairn | Round cairn | Dyffryn Ardudwy | 52.7716°N 4.0602°W, SH611213 | | Prehistoric | ME236 |
| | Settlement and Field System at Bron y Foel Uchaf | Unenclosed hut circle | Dyffryn Ardudwy | 52.8051°N 4.0638°W, SH609250 | | Prehistoric | ME162 |
| | Bryn-y-Castell Hillfort | Hillfort | Ffestiniog | 52.9689°N 3.8953°W, SH728429 | | Prehistoric | ME104 |
| | Gamallt Hut Circle Settlement | Hut circle settlement | Ffestiniog | 52.9763°N 3.8856°W, SH734438 | | Prehistoric | ME137 |
| | Hut Circle at Llyn Morwynion, Ffestiniog | Hut circle settlement | Ffestiniog | 52.9655°N 3.8804°W, SH738425 | | Prehistoric | ME194 |
| | Hut Circle East of Cymerau Uchaf | Unenclosed hut circle | Ffestiniog | 52.9723°N 3.9413°W, SH697434 | | Prehistoric | ME172 |
| | Hut Circle Settlement at Gelli Gonan | Unenclosed hut circle | Ffestiniog | 52.9914°N 3.9496°W, SH692455 | | Prehistoric | ME173 |
| | Hut Circle Settlement at Nant Ddu | Enclosed hut circle | Ffestiniog | 52.9752°N 3.9758°W, SH674438 | | Prehistoric | ME164 |
| | Cefn Coch Cairn and Cist | Round cairn | Ganllwyd | 52.7805°N 3.8979°W, SH720220 | | Prehistoric | ME220 |
| | Craig y Ganllwyd Cairn and Cist | Platform Cairn | Ganllwyd | 52.8122°N 3.9023°W, SH718255 | | Prehistoric | ME221 |
| | Hut Groups S of Bwlch-y-Ffordd | Enclosed hut circle | Ganllwyd | 52.8351°N 3.8991°W, SH721281 | | Prehistoric | ME046 |
| | Cefnfilltir Enclosed Homestead | Enclosed hut circle | Harlech | 52.8563°N 4.0952°W, SH590308 | | Prehistoric | ME098 |
| | Erw Wen Prehistoric and Medieval Settlement | Enclosed hut circle | Harlech | 52.8704°N 4.0714°W, SH606322 | | Prehistoric | ME188 |
| | Groes Las Prehistoric Settlement & Field System | Enclosed hut circle | Harlech | 52.8489°N 4.1108°W, SH579300 | | Prehistoric | ME095 |
| | Hut Circle West of Merthyr Farm | Unenclosed hut circle | Harlech | 52.8668°N 4.0856°W, SH597319 | | Prehistoric | ME176 |
| | Moel Goedog Camp | Hillfort | Harlech | 52.8721°N 4.0612°W, SH614325 | | Prehistoric | ME059 |
| | Moel Goedog Round Cairns & Standing Stones | Ring cairn | Harlech | 52.87°N 4.0675°W, SH609323 | | Prehistoric | ME058 |
| | Muriau'r Gwyddelod Ancient Village | Courtyard house | Harlech | 52.8516°N 4.1013°W, SH586303 | | Prehistoric | ME010 |
| | Clogwyn Arllef Hillfort & Field System | Hillfort | Llanbedr | 52.836°N 4.0863°W, SH595286 | | Prehistoric | ME123 |
| | Hut Circle Settlement at Bwlch Tyddiad | Hut circle settlement | Llanbedr | 52.8552°N 4.0042°W, SH651305 | | Prehistoric | ME182 |
| | Hut Circle Settlement East of Caer-Cynog | Hut circle settlement | Llanbedr | 52.8278°N 4.0431°W, SH624275 | | Prehistoric | ME180 |
| | Hut Circle West of Pen-y-Bryn | Unenclosed hut circle | Llanbedr | 52.8173°N 4.081°W, SH598264 | | Prehistoric | ME160 |
| | Llanbedr Standing Stones | Standing stone | Llanbedr | 52.8219°N 4.1039°W, SH583270 | | Prehistoric | ME056 |
| | Caer Euni Camp | Hillfort | Llandderfel | 52.9597°N 3.4893°W, SJ000412 | | Prehistoric | ME015 |
| | Caer Euni Stone Circles | Kerb cairn | Llandderfel | 52.9569°N 3.5003°W, SH993410 | | Prehistoric | ME040 |
| | Carnedd y Filiast Cairn | Round cairn | Llandderfel | 52.9868°N 3.6828°W, SH871445 | | Prehistoric | ME253 |
| | Cefn Caer Euni Round Cairn | Round cairn | Llandderfel | 52.9532°N 3.5064°W, SH988405 | | Prehistoric | ME227 |
| | Cefn Ddwysarn Camp | Enclosure | Llandderfel | 52.9311°N 3.5383°W, SH967381 | | Prehistoric | ME063 |
| | Garnedd Wen Cairn | Round cairn | Llandderfel | 52.958°N 3.6856°W, SH868414 | | Prehistoric | ME254 |
| | Maen y Rhos Standing Stone | Standing stone | Llandderfel | 52.9478°N 3.5393°W, SH966400 | | Prehistoric | ME228 |
| | Mynydd Mynyllod Enclosure | Enclosure | Llandderfel | 52.9471°N 3.4863°W, SJ002398 | | Prehistoric | ME090 |
| | Allt Lwyd Bronze Age Ritual Complex | Cairn | Llanegryn | 52.6487°N 4.0493°W, SH614076 | | Prehistoric | ME213 |
| | Allt Lwyd Cairn I | Round cairn | Llanegryn | 52.65°N 4.0489°W, SH614077 | | Prehistoric | ME214 |
| | Allt Lwyd Cairn II | Round cairn | Llanegryn | 52.6519°N 4.046°W, SH616079 | | Prehistoric | ME215 |
| | Twll y Darren Round Barrow | Round barrow | Llanegryn | 52.658°N 4.0351°W, SH624086 | | Prehistoric | ME222 |
| | Waen Fach Standing Stone | Standing stone | Llanegryn | 52.6235°N 4.0782°W, SH594048 | | Prehistoric | ME223 |
| | Coed Pen-y-Bryn Defended Settlement | Enclosure, Defensive | Llanelltyd | 52.7574°N 3.887°W, SH727194 | | Prehistoric | ME266 |
| | Foel Faner Defended Enclosure | Enclosure, Defensive | Llanelltyd | 52.7667°N 3.8797°W, SH732204 | | Prehistoric | ME267 |
| Bryn y Castell | Fortified Settlement at Bryn Castell | Enclosure | Llanelltyd | 52.7645°N 4.0011°W, SH650204 | | Prehistoric | ME138 |
| | Pentre Farm Barrow | Round barrow | Llanelltyd | 52.7549°N 3.8959°W, SH721191 | | Prehistoric | ME248 |
| | Bedd Gorfal Ring Cairn | Ring cairn | Llanfair | 52.8598°N 4.0616°W, SH612311 | | Prehistoric | ME135 |
| | Brwyn-Llynau Enclosed Settlement | Enclosure | Llanfair | 52.8449°N 4.1002°W, SH586295 | | Prehistoric | ME097 |
| | Enclosure and Early Field System North of Fronhill, Llanfair | Enclosure | Llanfair | 52.8474°N 4.1064°W, SH583298 | | Prehistoric | ME158 |
| | Ffridd Fron Kerb Cairn | Kerb cairn | Llanfair | 52.8716°N 4.0345°W, SH631324 | | Prehistoric | ME208 |
| | Fonlief Hir Standing Stones | Standing stone | Llanfair | 52.861°N 4.0788°W, SH601313 | | Prehistoric | ME057 |
| | Garreg Round Cairn | Cairn | Llanfair | 52.8578°N 4.0822°W, SH599309 | | Prehistoric | ME107 |
| | Gwern Einion Burial Chamber | Chambered tomb | Llanfair | 52.8364°N 4.0986°W, SH587286 | | Prehistoric | ME011 |
| | Hengaeau Standing Stone | Standing stone | Llanfair | 52.8401°N 4.1032°W, SH584290 | | Prehistoric | ME207 |
| | Hut Circle near Gerddi Bluog | Unenclosed hut circle | Llanfair | 52.855°N 4.0483°W, SH621305 | | Prehistoric | ME165 |
| | Hut Circle Settlement North-East of Moel-y-Gerddi | Unenclosed hut circle | Llanfair | 52.8679°N 4.0365°W, SH630319 | | Prehistoric | ME166 |
| | Hut Circle South of Tyddyn-Du | Unenclosed hut circle | Llanfair | 52.8453°N 4.0902°W, SH593295 | | Prehistoric | ME161 |
| | Settlement 400m SE of Moel Goedog | Enclosed hut circle | Llanfair | 52.8691°N 4.058°W, SH615321 | | Prehistoric | ME133 |
| | Settlement 500m SE of Moel Goedog | Hut circle settlement | Llanfair | 52.8688°N 4.056°W, SH616321 | | Prehistoric | ME134 |
| | Tyddyn Du Enclosed Settlement | Enclosed hut circle | Llanfair | 52.8474°N 4.0951°W, SH590298 | | Prehistoric | ME120 |
| | Carnedd Lwyd cairns | Round cairn | Llanfihangel-y-Pennant | 52.7033°N 3.951°W, SH682135 | | Prehistoric | ME241 |
| Craig-yr-Aderyn | Craig yr Aderyn Hillfort | Hillfort | Llanfihangel-y-Pennant | 52.6422°N 4.0042°W, SH644068 | | Prehistoric | ME075 |
| | Hut Circle Settlement at Craig Ty'n-y-Cornel | Unenclosed hut circle | Llanfihangel-y-Pennant | 52.6567°N 4.0147°W, SH637084 | | Prehistoric | ME167 |
| | Defended Settlement 150m NW of Plas Ynysfor | Enclosure, Defensive | Llanfrothen | 52.9638°N 4.0869°W, SH599427 | | Prehistoric | ME265 |
| | Unenclosed Hut Circle Settlement at Bryn Derw | Hut circle settlement | Llanfrothen | 52.9648°N 4.0523°W, SH622428 | | Prehistoric | ME178 |
| | Unenclosed Hut Circle Settlement East of Garth-y-Foel | Unenclosed hut circle | Llanfrothen | 52.978°N 4.0484°W, SH625442 | | Prehistoric | ME170 |
| A view towards Llwyngwril and Castell y Gaer | Castell y Gaer | Hillfort | Llangelynnin | 52.6606°N 4.0832°W, SH592090 | | Prehistoric | ME053 |
| | Castell-Mawr | Hillfort | Llangelynnin | 52.6224°N 4.0986°W, SH580048 | | Prehistoric | ME073 |
| Standing Stones on Mynydd Craig-wen | Group of Standing Stones 810m South West of Bryn Seward | Stone alignment | Llangelynnin | 52.6814°N 4.0467°W, SH617113 | | Prehistoric | ME084 |
| | Hut Enclosure and Early Field System South of Mynydd Graigwen | Field system | Llangelynnin | 52.683°N 4.0494°W, SH616115 | | Prehistoric | ME087 |
| | Llechrwyd Hillfort | Hillfort | Llangelynnin | 52.6075°N 4.1093°W, SH572031 | | Prehistoric | ME124 |
| | Parth-y-Gwyddwch, Standing Stones 150m N of | Standing stone | Llangelynnin | 52.6725°N 4.0701°W, SH601103 | | Prehistoric | ME259 |
| | Tal-y-Gareg Camp | Hillfort | Llangelynnin | 52.6113°N 4.1072°W, SH574035 | | Prehistoric | ME074 |
| | Foel Cwm-Sian Llwyd cairn | Round cairn | Llangywer | 52.8737°N 3.4915°W, SH997317 | | Prehistoric | ME243 |
| | Foel y Geifr Cairn | Round cairn | Llangywer | 52.8347°N 3.5793°W, SH937275 | | Prehistoric | ME245 |
| | Aran Fawddwy Cairn | Round cairn | Llanuwchllyn | 52.787°N 3.6878°W, SH862223 | | Prehistoric | ME258 |
| | Bancian Duon Hut Circle Settlement and Deserted Rural Settlement | Unenclosed hut circle | Llanuwchllyn | 52.8801°N 3.7593°W, SH816328 | | Prehistoric | ME197 |
| | Cairn 200m SE of Foel Ystrodur Fawr | Round cairn | Llanuwchllyn | 52.8898°N 3.7612°W, SH816339 | | Prehistoric | ME256 |
| | Cairn 225m S of Moel Caws | Round cairn | Llanuwchllyn | 52.8313°N 3.715°W, SH845273 | | Prehistoric | ME081 |
| | Cairn 300m SE of Bryn Cau | Round cairn | Llanuwchllyn | 52.882°N 3.7556°W, SH819330 | | Prehistoric | ME255 |
| | Hut Group & Enclosures 117m S of Moel Caws | Hut group | Llanuwchllyn | 52.8321°N 3.7154°W, SH845274 | | Prehistoric | ME082 |
| | Llechwedd Erwent Hut Circle Settlement | Unenclosed hut circle settlement | Llanuwchllyn | 52.8898°N 3.7499°W, SH822339 | | Prehistoric | ME199 |
| | Arenig Fawr Cairn | Round cairn | Llanycil | 52.9171°N 3.746°W, SH827369 | | Prehistoric | ME257 |
| | Coed Cae Fali Hut Circle Settlement | Enclosed hut circle | Maentwrog | 52.9425°N 4.0412°W, SH629402 | | Prehistoric | ME149 |
| | Ffridd Braich Llwyd Bronze Age Ritual Complex | Ring cairn | Mawddwy | 52.7105°N 3.6119°W, SH912137 | | Prehistoric | ME217 |
| | Fridd round barrows | Round barrow | Pennal | 52.6018°N 3.8452°W, SH751020 | | Prehistoric | ME231 |
| | Tarren Hendre Cairn | Round cairn | Pennal | 52.6175°N 3.9456°W, SH683039 | | Prehistoric | ME041 |
| | Ty'n y Berllan Settlement | Enclosed hut circle | Penrhyndeudraeth | 52.9333°N 4.084°W, SH600393 | | Prehistoric | ME096 |
| Bryn Cader Faner | Bryn Cader-Faner Round Cairn | Round cairn | Talsarnau | 52.8982°N 4.0113°W, SH647353 | | Prehistoric | ME061 |
| | Coety Bach Homestead | Enclosed hut circle | Talsarnau | 52.905°N 4.0383°W, SH630361 | | Prehistoric | ME109 |
| | Coety Mawr Round Hut and Enclosure | Unenclosed hut circle | Talsarnau | 52.9043°N 4.0372°W, SH631360 | | Prehistoric | ME110 |
| | Cwm Moch Settlement | Enclosed hut circle | Talsarnau | 52.9069°N 3.9872°W, SH664362 | | Prehistoric | ME132 |
| | Deserted Rural Settlement North of Llyn y Fedw | Hut circle settlement | Talsarnau | 52.8811°N 4.0351°W, SH631334 | | Prehistoric | ME189 |
| | Enclosed Hut Circle Settlement South East of Yr Onen | Enclosed hut circle | Talsarnau | 52.9147°N 4.012°W, SH648371 | | Prehistoric | ME140 |
| | Enclosed Hut Group at Nurse Cae Du | Enclosed hut circle | Talsarnau | 52.9341°N 3.9519°W, SH688391 | | Prehistoric | ME163 |
| | Ffridd Fedw Round Hut, Enclosure, Ancient Fields and Kerb Cairn | Kerb cairn | Talsarnau | 52.8761°N 4.057°W, SH616329 | | Prehistoric | ME111 |
| | Hut Circle North-East of Moel Goedog | Unenclosed hut circle | Talsarnau | 52.8743°N 4.0528°W, SH619329 | | Prehistoric | ME183 |
| | Hut Circle Settlement and Cairn Field West of Llyn Eiddew Bach | Hut circle settlement | Talsarnau | 52.8899°N 4.0252°W, SH638344 | | Prehistoric | ME141 |
| | Hut Circles East of Moel Geifr | Hut circle settlement | Talsarnau | 52.9013°N 4.0168°W, SH644356 | | Prehistoric | ME181 |
| | Llyn Eiddew Bach Ring Cairn I | Ring cairn | Talsarnau | 52.8951°N 4.014°W, SH646349 | | Prehistoric | ME209 |
| | Llyn Eiddew Bach Ring Cairn II | Ring cairn | Talsarnau | 52.8903°N 4.0174°W, SH643344 | | Prehistoric | ME210 |
| | Llyn Eiddew Bach Round Cairns | Kerb cairn | Talsarnau | 52.8901°N 4.0238°W, SH639344 | | Prehistoric | ME060 |
| | Maes y Caerau Homestead | Concentric enclosed hut circle | Talsarnau | 52.9059°N 4.0309°W, SH635362 | | Prehistoric | ME117 |
| | Moel y Glo Homestead & Burnt Mound | Enclosed hut circle | Talsarnau | 52.889°N 4.0442°W, SH625343 | | Prehistoric | ME118 |
| | Settlement E of Eisingrug | Hut circle settlement | Talsarnau | 52.8908°N 4.0516°W, SH620345 | | Prehistoric | ME143 |
| | Settlements SW of Bryn Cader Faner | Hut circle settlement | Talsarnau | 52.8962°N 4.0152°W, SH645351 | | Prehistoric | ME144 |
| | Tyddyn Sion Wyn Ring Cairn | Ring cairn | Talsarnau | 52.8766°N 4.0602°W, SH614330 | | Prehistoric | ME200 |
| | Y Gyrn Round Cairns | Round cairn | Talsarnau | 52.903°N 4.0218°W, SH641359 | | Prehistoric | ME062 |
| | Afon Prysor, cairn to NW of | Round cairn | Trawsfynydd | 52.9375°N 3.8367°W, SH766393 | | Prehistoric | ME246 |
| | Cefn Clawdd Early Settlement and Fields | Field system | Trawsfynydd | 52.885°N 3.9503°W, SH688336 | | Prehistoric | ME130 |
| | Cefn Clawdd Ring Cairn | Ring cairn | Trawsfynydd | 52.8888°N 3.9576°W, SH683341 | | Prehistoric | ME211 |
| | Enclosed Hut Circle Settlement at Dolbelydr | Enclosed hut circle | Trawsfynydd | 52.9227°N 3.8948°W, SH727378 | | Prehistoric | ME174 |
| | Enclosed Hut Circle Settlement at Fridd Bodyfyddau | Enclosed hut circle | Trawsfynydd | 52.8911°N 3.8874°W, SH730342 | | Prehistoric | ME168 |
| | Hut Circle 800m West of Moelfryn-Isaf | Unenclosed hut circle | Trawsfynydd | 52.9036°N 3.9717°W, SH674358 | | Prehistoric | ME131 |
| | Hut Circle and Field System at Craiglaseithin | Unenclosed hut circle | Trawsfynydd | 52.8863°N 3.886°W, SH732337 | | Prehistoric | ME169 |
| | Hut Circle at Afon Graig Wen | Unenclosed hut circle | Trawsfynydd | 52.9291°N 3.8825°W, SH735385 | | Prehistoric | ME175 |
| | Hut Circle Settlement at Crawcwellt South | Hut circle settlement | Trawsfynydd | 52.847°N 3.9311°W, SH700295 | | Prehistoric | ME171 |
| | Llech Idris | Standing stone | Trawsfynydd | 52.8622°N 3.8863°W, SH731310 | | Prehistoric | ME072 |
| | Maen Llwyd Standing Stones | Standing stone | Trawsfynydd | 52.8786°N 3.9226°W, SH707329 | | Prehistoric | ME115 |
| | Bryn Dinas Cairn | Round barrow | Tywyn | 52.5771°N 4.0105°W, SN638995 | | Prehistoric | ME232 |
| | Capel Maethlon round barrow | Round barrow | Tywyn | 52.5667°N 4.0256°W, SN628984 | | Prehistoric | ME230 |
| | Croes Faen Standing Stone | Standing stone | Tywyn | 52.5935°N 4.0729°W, SH596015 | | Prehistoric | ME088 |
| | Dysyrnant Platform Cairn | Platform Cairn | Tywyn | 52.5819°N 3.9983°W, SH647001 | | Prehistoric | ME233 |
| | Eglwys Gwyddelod Stone Circle | Stone circle | Tywyn | 52.5828°N 3.9752°W, SH662001 | | Prehistoric | ME229 |

Scheduled monuments in historic Merionethshire, Gwynedd, Wales.
=Religious, Ritual and Funerary
=Domestic
=Defence

== See also ==
- List of Cadw properties
- List of castles in Wales
- List of hill forts in Wales
- Historic houses in Wales
- List of monastic houses in Wales
- List of museums in Wales
- List of Roman villas in Wales
