= List of prehistoric scheduled monuments in Gwynedd (former Caernarfonshire) =

Gwynedd is a large rural county in North Wales. It includes the high mountains of Snowdonia National Park and the mixed farmland and hills of the Llŷn peninsula, which between them make up the historic county of Caernarfonshire. The southern part of Gwynedd is the softer coastal and upland landscapes of the historic county of Merionethshire. Gwynedd, the second-largest county in Wales, has a total of 497 scheduled monuments. That is too many to have on a single list article, so for convenience the list is divided into three. The 194 prehistoric sites in historic Caernarfonshire (shown below), the 171 prehistoric sites in historic Merionethshire, and the 132 Roman to modern sites across the whole of Gwynedd. One of the oldest sites is a stone axe factory. Over the whole of Gwynedd, there are 139 burial sites (72 on this list), including chambered tombs, cairns, mounds and barrows, dating from the Neolithic, Bronze Age, and Iron Age. A further 167 sites are 'domestic' (103 on this list), mostly Iron Age hut circles and enclosures. As well as several field systems, there are 47 defensive sites (27 on this list) such as hillforts and promontory forts, again from the Iron Age. Gwynedd is a unitary authority comprising most of the two historic counties. In 1974 it also merged with Anglesey, and the merged county was also called Gwynedd. Since 1996 Anglesey has been a separate county again.

The southern prehistoric sites are listed at List of prehistoric scheduled monuments in Gwynedd (former Merionethshire)

All 132 Roman, early medieval, medieval and modern sites for the whole of Gwynedd are listed at List of Roman-to-modern scheduled monuments in Gwynedd

Scheduled monuments have statutory protection. It is illegal to disturb the ground surface or any standing remains. The compilation of the list is undertaken by Cadw Welsh Historic Monuments, which is an executive agency of the National Assembly of Wales. The list of scheduled monuments below is supplied by Cadw with additional material from RCAHMW and Gwynedd Archaeological Trust.

== Prehistoric scheduled monuments in historic Caernarfonshire ==
Image	Name	Site type	Community	Location	Details	Period	SAM No & Refs
	Carnedd y Ddelw Cairn	Round cairn	Aber	53.2162°N 3.9367°W, SH707705		Prehistoric	CN398
	Carnedd y Saeson & Neighbouring Cairns NW of Foel Dduarth	Cairnfield	Aber	53.2264°N 3.9811°W, SH678717		Prehistoric	CN138
	Cras cairn	Round cairn	Aber	53.218°N 4.0177°W, SH653708		Prehistoric	CN346
	Cras, cairn to N of	Round cairn	Aber	53.221°N 4.0178°W, SH653712		Prehistoric	CN344
	Cras, ring cairn to N of	Ring cairn	Aber	53.2213°N 4.017°W, SH654712		Prehistoric	CN345
	Enclosed Hut Circle Settlement South-East of Bod Silin	Enclosed hut circle settlement	Aber	53.2307°N 3.984°W, SH676722		Prehistoric	CN285
	Foel Dduarth Enclosure	Enclosure	Aber	53.2263°N 3.9787°W, SH680717		Prehistoric	CN122
	Foel Dduarth, cairn to NE of	Round cairn	Aber	53.2289°N 3.9738°W, SH683720		Prehistoric	CN342
	Hut Circle and Rectangular Hut North of Wern Y Pandy	Unenclosed hut circle	Aber	53.2269°N 3.9855°W, SH675718		Prehistoric	CN286
	Hut circle East of Afon Rhaeadr Fawr	Unenclosed hut circle	Aber	53.2197°N 3.9988°W, SH666710		Prehistoric	CN244
	Hut Circle Settlement on Caer Mynydd	Hut circle settlement	Aber	53.2226°N 4.0128°W, SH657713		Prehistoric	CN245
	Hut Circles North of Afon Anafon	Unenclosed hut circle	Aber	53.2165°N 3.9532°W, SH696706		Prehistoric	CN290
	Hut Group 180m NW of Hafod-y-Gelyn	Enclosed hut circle	Aber	53.2234°N 3.9866°W, SH674714		Prehistoric	CN135
	Hut Group 750m SE of Bod Silin	Enclosed hut circle	Aber	53.231°N 3.9826°W, SH677722		Prehistoric	CN136
	Hut Group W of Foel Dduarth	Enclosed hut circle	Aber	53.225°N 3.9829°W, SH677716		Prehistoric	CN123
	Maes y Gaer Camp (Hillfort)	Hillfort	Aber	53.2328°N 4.0037°W, SH663725		Prehistoric	CN038
	Meuryn Isaf Cairn	Round cairn	Aber	53.2186°N 3.9915°W, SH671709		Prehistoric	CN308
	Settlement Above Ffridd Ddu	Hut circle settlement	Aber	53.2218°N 4.0218°W, SH651713		Prehistoric	CN243
	Castell Odo	Hillfort	Aberdaron	52.8232°N 4.692°W, SH187284		Prehistoric	CN045
	Hut Circle at Mynydd-y-Graig	Unenclosed hut circle	Aberdaron	52.8101°N 4.633°W, SH226268		Prehistoric	CN284
	Hut Circle Settlement North-West of Mount Pleasant	Unenclosed hut circle	Aberdaron	52.8145°N 4.7461°W, SH150276		Prehistoric	CN282
	Huts on Mynydd Enlli, Bardsey Island	Hut circle settlement	Aberdaron	52.7592°N 4.7846°W, SH122215		Prehistoric	CN187
	Mynydd Enlli Round Barrow, Bardsey Island	Round barrow	Aberdaron	52.761°N 4.7838°W, SH122217		Prehistoric	CN140
	Mynydd Rhiw Round Cairns	Round cairn	Aberdaron	52.8352°N 4.6249°W, SH232296		Prehistoric	CN102
	Rhiw Burial Chambers	Chambered long cairn	Aberdaron	52.8276°N 4.6171°W, SH237287		Prehistoric	CN026
	Cwm Dyli Ancient Village	Unenclosed hut circle settlement	Beddgelert	53.0676°N 4.0092°W, SH654541		Prehistoric	CN035
	Hut circle settlement above Afon Goch	Hut circle settlement	Beddgelert	52.9941°N 4.1053°W, SH588461		Prehistoric	CN247
	Hut Circle Settlement in Cwm Gelli Iago (North)	Unenclosed hut circle	Beddgelert	53.0097°N 4.031°W, SH638477		Prehistoric	CN255
	Hut Circle Settlement in Cwm Gelli Iago (South)	Unenclosed hut circle	Beddgelert	53.0058°N 4.0315°W, SH638472		Prehistoric	CN254
	Hut Circle Settlement in Cwm Gelli Iago (West)	Unenclosed hut circle settlement	Beddgelert	53.0075°N 4.0347°W, SH636475		Prehistoric	CN253
	Hut circle settlement near Oerddwr Uchaf	Hut circle settlement	Beddgelert	52.9931°N 4.1112°W, SH583460		Prehistoric	CN246
	Hut Circle Settlement North of Cwm Dyli Power Station	Unenclosed hut circle	Beddgelert	53.0676°N 4.0117°W, SH653541		Prehistoric	CN289
	Pen y Gaer Camp	Hillfort	Beddgelert	52.9904°N 4.1073°W, SH586457		Prehistoric	CN051
	Hut Circle Settlement at Ffos Coetmor	Unenclosed hut circle	Bethesda	53.1854°N 4.0528°W, SH629673		Prehistoric	CN263
	Craig Cwmbychan cairn	Round cairn	Betws Garmon	53.0762°N 4.176°W, SH543554		Prehistoric	CN364
	Enclosed Hut Circle West of Llwyn Bedw	Enclosed hut circle	Betws Garmon	53.1009°N 4.1995°W, SH528582		Prehistoric	CN264
	Hut Circle Settlement North of Bryn Mair	Hut circle settlement	Betws Garmon	53.1061°N 4.2186°W, SH515588		Prehistoric	CN261
	Ty Coch Prehistoric Settlement	Unenclosed hut circle	Betws Garmon	53.0827°N 4.1968°W, SH529561		Prehistoric	CN194
	Y Garn cairns	Round cairn	Betws Garmon	53.0509°N 4.163°W, SH551525		Prehistoric	CN358
	Mynydd Rhiw Stone Axe Factory	Axe factory	Botwnnog	52.8377°N 4.6234°W, SH233299		Prehistoric	CN207
	Sarn Meyllteryn churchyard standing stone	Standing stone	Botwnnog	52.8641°N 4.6202°W, SH237328		Prehistoric	CN382
	Enclosed Hut Group South of Penbodlas	Enclosed hut circle settlement	Buan	52.8714°N 4.547°W, SH286333		Prehistoric	CN276
	Garn Boduan	Hillfort	Buan	52.9245°N 4.511°W, SH313393		Prehistoric	CN009
	Garn Saethon Defended Settlement	Enclosure, defensive	Buan	52.8741°N 4.5304°W, SH297337		Prehistoric	CN408
	Hut Circle Settlement at Pen-y-Caerau	Unenclosed hut circle	Buan	52.8793°N 4.5426°W, SH290343		Prehistoric	CN271
	Caerlan Tibot Defended Enclosure	Enclosure, defensive	Caernarfon	53.1595°N 4.2343°W, SH507648		Prehistoric	CN400
Bachwen Burial Chamber	Bachwen Burial Chamber	Chambered long cairn	Clynnog	53.0189°N 4.3752°W, SH407494		Prehistoric	CN008
	Enclosed Hut Group North West of Cwm Farm	Enclosed hut circle	Clynnog	52.9877°N 4.3337°W, SH434459		Prehistoric	CN310
	Graianog Standing Stone & Round Cairns	Standing stone	Clynnog	53.0171°N 4.3047°W, SH455491		Prehistoric	CN098
	Hut Circle Settlement South-West of Pen-yr-allt Uchaf	Hut circle settlement	Clynnog	53.0139°N 4.3678°W, SH412489		Prehistoric	CN312
	Hut Circle Settlement West of Cwm Farm	Hut circle settlement	Clynnog	52.9888°N 4.3397°W, SH430460		Prehistoric	CN311
Penarth Burial Chamber	Penarth Burial Chamber	Chambered tomb	Clynnog	53.0338°N 4.3429°W, SH429510		Prehistoric	CN078
	Two Round Cairns E of Gyrn Ddu	Round cairn	Clynnog	52.9937°N 4.3766°W, SH405466		Prehistoric	CN107
	Y Foel Camp	Hillfort	Clynnog	53.0309°N 4.3123°W, SH450506		Prehistoric	CN115
	Caer-Dynni Burial Chamber	Chambered long cairn	Criccieth	52.9206°N 4.2161°W, SH511382		Prehistoric	CN081
	Braich y Cornel Hut Circle Settlement and Field System	Hut circle settlement	Dolbenmaen	52.9794°N 4.1568°W, SH552445		Prehistoric	CN274
	Cae-Bach Hut Circle Settlement	Hut circle settlement	Dolbenmaen	52.9801°N 4.1689°W, SH544447		Prehistoric	CN313
	Castell Caerau	Hillfort	Dolbenmaen	52.9718°N 4.2218°W, SH508439		Prehistoric	CN044
	Cist Cerrig Burial Chamber & Cup Marked Rock	Chambered tomb	Dolbenmaen	52.9233°N 4.1682°W, SH543384		Prehistoric	CN118
	Craig Cwm Silyn round cairn	Round cairn	Dolbenmaen	53.0293°N 4.2001°W, SH525502		Prehistoric	CN388
	Craig-y-Tyddyn Camp	Hillfort	Dolbenmaen	52.9611°N 4.2263°W, SH505427		Prehistoric	CN046
	Cwm Llefrith cairn	Round cairn	Dolbenmaen	53.0033°N 4.1627°W, SH549473		Prehistoric	CN385
	Enclosed Hut Group North-East of Llystyn Uchaf	Enclosed hut circle	Dolbenmaen	52.9765°N 4.2546°W, SH487445		Prehistoric	CN281
	Fach-goch, standing stone to SSE of	Standing stone	Dolbenmaen	52.9486°N 4.1322°W, SH568411		Prehistoric	CN386
	Hut Circle and Rectangular Hut at Clogwyn y Gath	Unenclosed hut circle	Dolbenmaen	52.9744°N 4.1339°W, SH568440		Prehistoric	CN298
	Hut Circle East of Taleifion	Unenclosed hut circle	Dolbenmaen	52.9726°N 4.2358°W, SH499440		Prehistoric	CN280
	Hut Circle Settlement Above Gilfach	Unenclosed hut circle	Dolbenmaen	53.0016°N 4.2036°W, SH522471		Prehistoric	CN222
	Hut Circle Settlement at Bwlch Cwm Ystradllyn	Unenclosed hut circle	Dolbenmaen	52.9835°N 4.126°W, SH573450		Prehistoric	CN272
	Hut Circle Settlement East of Cefn Bifor	Unenclosed hut circle	Dolbenmaen	52.9816°N 4.1427°W, SH562448		Prehistoric	CN273
	Hut Circles at Braich y Cornel	Unenclosed hut circle	Dolbenmaen	52.9815°N 4.1599°W, SH550448		Prehistoric	CN275
	Hut Circles near Craig y Gesail	Unenclosed hut circle	Dolbenmaen	52.9489°N 4.1643°W, SH547413		Prehistoric	CN237
	Hut Group West of Cwm Mawr	Hut circle settlement	Dolbenmaen	52.9498°N 4.1609°W, SH549413		Prehistoric	CN239
	Hut Settlement at Mynydd Graig Goch South	Unenclosed hut circle	Dolbenmaen	53.0048°N 4.2348°W, SH501476		Prehistoric	CN292
	Hut Settlement at Mynydd Graig Goch, North	Enclosed hut circle settlement	Dolbenmaen	53.008°N 4.2386°W, SH498479		Prehistoric	CN294
	Hut Settlement at Mynydd Graig Goch, Central	Unenclosed hut circle settlement	Dolbenmaen	53.0059°N 4.2374°W, SH499477		Prehistoric	CN293
	Huts and Enclosures above Ceunant y Ddol	Enclosed hut circle	Dolbenmaen	52.9911°N 4.1627°W, SH549459		Prehistoric	CN241
	Huts and Enclosures, Cwm Llefrith	Hut circle settlement	Dolbenmaen	52.9993°N 4.1622°W, SH549468		Prehistoric	CN240
	Mynydd Graig Goch round cairn	Round cairn	Dolbenmaen	53.0114°N 4.2388°W, SH498483		Prehistoric	CN389
	Ancient Village N of Llainllan	Enclosed hut circle	Llanaelhaearn	52.9782°N 4.3733°W, SH408449		Prehistoric	CN070
	Burnt Mound East of Pen-y-Gaer	Burnt mound	Llanaelhaearn	52.9847°N 4.3462°W, SH425456		Prehistoric	CN336
	Hut Group & Field System North West of Tyddyn Mawr (previously known as Hut Group NW of Tyddyn Mawr)	Unenclosed hut circle	Llanaelhaearn	52.9805°N 4.345°W, SH426451		Prehistoric	CN112
	Hut Group and Field System South East of Farm Yard	Enclosed hut circle	Llanaelhaearn	52.9844°N 4.3793°W, SH403456		Prehistoric	CN106
	Hut Group N of Gyrn Ddu	Unenclosed hut circle	Llanaelhaearn	52.9975°N 4.3811°W, SH402471		Prehistoric	CN108
	Hut Group North of Cwmceiliog	Enclosed hut circle	Llanaelhaearn	52.9804°N 4.3517°W, SH422451		Prehistoric	CN111
	Hut Group West of Gyrn Ddu	Unenclosed hut circle settlement	Llanaelhaearn	52.9934°N 4.3895°W, SH397466		Prehistoric	CN109
	Pen y Gaer Camp	Hillfort	Llanaelhaearn	52.9838°N 4.3419°W, SH428455		Prehistoric	CN052
	Round Cairn West of Gyrn Ddu	Round cairn	Llanaelhaearn	52.9928°N 4.3906°W, SH396466		Prehistoric	CN110
The main gate of Tre'r Ceiri hillfort	Tre'r Ceiri Camp	Hillfort	Llanaelhaearn	52.9742°N 4.4248°W, SH372446		Prehistoric	CN028
	Tyddyn Mawr, standing stone to SSW of	Standing stone	Llanaelhaearn	52.9743°N 4.3383°W, SH430444		Prehistoric	CN384
	Yr Eifl, cairn on NW summit of	Round cairn	Llanaelhaearn	52.9838°N 4.4429°W, SH361457		Prehistoric	CN383
	Hut Circle at Cae-Cerig-Isaf	Unenclosed hut circle	Llanbedrog	52.8491°N 4.5075°W, SH312309		Prehistoric	CN296
	Nant Castell Camp	Hillfort	Llanbedrog	52.8543°N 4.4941°W, SH321314		Prehistoric	CN036
	Pen-y-Gaer	Promontory fort – inland	Llanbedrog	52.8545°N 4.4913°W, SH323314		Prehistoric	CN221
	Hut Circle Settlement and Rectangular Hut North of Hebron Station	Unenclosed hut circle	Llanberis	53.109°N 4.1163°W, SH584589		Prehistoric	CN288
	Cae Metta Hut Group	Enclosed hut circle	Llanddeiniolen	53.1617°N 4.1911°W, SH536649		Prehistoric	CN168
	Cefn Mawr Hut Group	Hut circle settlement	Llanddeiniolen	53.164°N 4.1953°W, SH533652		Prehistoric	CN200
	Dinas Dinorwic Camp	Hillfort	Llanddeiniolen	53.1651°N 4.1707°W, SH549653		Prehistoric	CN017
	Enclosed Hut Group North East of Caer Mynydd	Enclosed hut circle	Llanddeiniolen	53.1619°N 4.1324°W, SH575648		Prehistoric	CN225
	Enclosed Hut Group South West of Caer Mynydd	Enclosed hut circle	Llanddeiniolen	53.1601°N 4.1362°W, SH572646		Prehistoric	CN226
	Enclosed Hut Group SW of Bronydd	Enclosed hut circle	Llanddeiniolen	53.1631°N 4.1306°W, SH576650		Prehistoric	CN227
	Glascoed Ancient Village	Enclosed hut circle	Llanddeiniolen	53.1595°N 4.1746°W, SH547647		Prehistoric	CN060
	Glascoed Round Cairn	Round cairn	Llanddeiniolen	53.1614°N 4.1749°W, SH546649		Prehistoric	CN150
	Hut Circle South of Rhyd y Galen, Pont-Rug	Unenclosed hut circle	Llanddeiniolen	53.1557°N 4.2233°W, SH514643		Prehistoric	CN229
	Hut Group and Enclosure Near Cae Cerrig	Hut group	Llanddeiniolen	53.1558°N 4.1341°W, SH573641		Prehistoric	CN233
	Hut Group Near Tan-y-Coed Pont Rhythallt	Hut group	Llanddeiniolen	53.1503°N 4.1692°W, SH550636		Prehistoric	CN232
	Pen-Isa'r-Waen Camp	Enclosed hut circle	Llanddeiniolen	53.1506°N 4.1612°W, SH555636		Prehistoric	CN050
	Pen-y-Gaer Camp	Hillfort	Llanddeiniolen	53.1567°N 4.1737°W, SH547643		Prehistoric	CN149
	Settlement NW of Waen Rhythallt	Enclosed hut circle	Llanddeiniolen	53.1537°N 4.1799°W, SH543640		Prehistoric	CN224
	Dinas Dinlle Camp	Promontory fort – coastal	Llandwrog	53.0816°N 4.3347°W, SH437563		Prehistoric	CN048
	Glynllifon standing stone	Standing stone	Llandwrog	53.0751°N 4.3037°W, SH457555		Prehistoric	CN356
	Hut Group near Pen Llwyn, Carmel	Enclosed hut circle	Llandwrog	53.0659°N 4.2623°W, SH485544		Prehistoric	CN238
	Huts & Field Systems NE of Nantlle	Enclosure	Llandwrog	53.0634°N 4.2089°W, SH520540		Prehistoric	CN179
	Maen Llwyd in Glynllifon	Standing stone	Llandwrog	53.0619°N 4.3221°W, SH444541		Prehistoric	CN143
	Caer Pencraig Fort	Hillfort	Llandygai	53.1844°N 4.1059°W, SH593673		Prehistoric	CN195
	Carnedd Howel Round Cairn	Round cairn	Llandygai	53.2007°N 4.1082°W, SH592691		Prehistoric	CN393
	Enclosed Hut Circle Settlement at Cororion Rough	Enclosed hut circle	Llandygai	53.1955°N 4.1055°W, SH594685		Prehistoric	CN268
	Gerlan Hut Group	Unenclosed hut circle	Llandygai	53.1808°N 4.1143°W, SH588669		Prehistoric	CN192
	Henge Monument and Cursus	Cursus	Llandygai	53.2167°N 4.1043°W, SH595709		Prehistoric	CN153
	Moel y Ci cairn	Round cairn	Llandygai	53.1732°N 4.1105°W, SH590660		Prehistoric	CN374
	Parc Gelli Hut Group and Ancient Fields	Unenclosed hut circle	Llandygai	53.1941°N 4.0955°W, SH601683		Prehistoric	CN202
Pen y Dinas hillfort from the west	Pen Dinas Camp	Hillfort	Llandygai	53.191°N 4.0819°W, SH610680		Prehistoric	CN120
	Sling Burial Chamber	Chambered tomb	Llandygai	53.1805°N 4.0882°W, SH605668		Prehistoric	CN119
	Bwlch ym Mhwll-le cairn	Round cairn	Llanelltyd	53.1947°N 4.0411°W, SH637683		Prehistoric	CN343
	Moel Faban cairn cemetery	Round cairn	Llanelltyd	53.1903°N 4.05°W, SH631678		Prehistoric	CN359
	Moel Wnion cairn	Round cairn	Llanelltyd	53.2073°N 4.0234°W, SH649697		Prehistoric	CN347
	Cilan-Uchaf Burial Chamber	Chambered tomb	Llanengan	52.7825°N 4.5218°W, SH300235		Prehistoric	CN104
	Pared Mawr Camp	Promontory fort – coastal	Llanengan	52.7929°N 4.517°W, SH303246		Prehistoric	CN103
	Carnedd Dafydd cairn	Round cairn	Llanllechid, (also Capel Curig), (see also Conwy)	53.1477°N 4.0008°W, SH662630		Prehistoric	CN367
	Carnedd Dafydd, cairn to SW of	Round cairn	Llanllechid, (also Capel Curig), (see also Conwy)	53.1466°N 4.0029°W, SH661629		Prehistoric	CN368
Carnedd Fach	Carnedd Fach cairn	Round cairn	Llanllechid, (also Capel Curig), (see also Conwy)	53.1438°N 4.0079°W, SH657626		Prehistoric	CN366
	Carnedd Llewelyn cairn	Round cairn	Llanllechid, (also Capel Curig), (also Caerhun), (see also Conwy)	53.1602°N 3.9703°W, SH683643		Prehistoric	CN371
	Coed Uchaf Hut Group	Field system	Llanllechid	53.1946°N 4.0731°W, SH616684		Prehistoric	CN176
	Early Fields and Dwellings East of Llanllechid	Enclosed hut circle	Llanllechid	53.1959°N 4.0492°W, SH632685		Prehistoric	CN121
	Fortified Hut Settlement above Rachub	Enclosed hut circle	Llanllechid	53.1905°N 4.0545°W, SH628679		Prehistoric	CN211
	Hut Circle at Twll Pant-Hiriol	Unenclosed hut circle	Llanllechid	53.1991°N 4.0348°W, SH641688		Prehistoric	CN258
	Hut Circle Settlement East of Bryn Hall	Hut circle settlement	Llanllechid	53.2029°N 4.0392°W, SH639693		Prehistoric	CN259
	Hut Circle Settlement in Cwm Ffridlas	Unenclosed hut circle	Llanllechid	53.1955°N 4.032°W, SH643684		Prehistoric	CN214
	Hut Circle Settlement NW of Tan-y-Marian	Hut circle settlement	Llanllechid	53.2103°N 4.0769°W, SH613701		Prehistoric	CN252
	Hut Circle Settlement on Mynydd Du	Unenclosed hut circle	Llanllechid	53.1636°N 4.0218°W, SH649648		Prehistoric	CN217
	Hut Circles West of Corbri	Enclosed hut circle settlement	Llanllechid	53.1978°N 4.0722°W, SH616687		Prehistoric	CN287
	Huts & Enclosures in Cwm Caseg	Hut circle settlement	Llanllechid	53.1827°N 4.0091°W, SH658669		Prehistoric	CN133
	Rhiw Coch Camp	Enclosed hut circle	Llanllechid	53.2028°N 4.0722°W, SH616693		Prehistoric	CN056
	Settlements & Enclosures on S & E sides of Moel Faban	Unenclosed hut circle	Llanllechid	53.1917°N 4.0423°W, SH636680		Prehistoric	CN210
	Caer Engan	Hillfort	Llanllyfni	53.0489°N 4.2738°W, SH476526		Prehistoric	CN148
	Caerau Ancient Village	Enclosed hut circle	Llanllyfni	53.0159°N 4.2837°W, SH469489		Prehistoric	CN067
	Craig y Dinas Camp	Hillfort	Llanllyfni	53.0426°N 4.3162°W, SH448519		Prehistoric	CN057
	Drws y Coed Prehistoric Settlement	Unenclosed hut circle	Llanllyfni	53.0601°N 4.1699°W, SH546536		Prehistoric	CN209
	Early Habitation Site 180m West of Pen-Yr-Allt	Concentric enclosed hut circle	Llanllyfni	53.0612°N 4.2708°W, SH479539		Prehistoric	CN088
	Enclosed Hut Circle Settlement West of Votglas	Enclosed hut circle settlement	Llanllyfni	53.059°N 4.2527°W, SH491536		Prehistoric	CN265
	Garnedd-goch Round Cairn	Round cairn	Llanllyfni	53.0222°N 4.2211°W, SH511495		Prehistoric	CN387
	Penbryn Mawr standing stone	Standing stone	Llanllyfni	53.0597°N 4.2998°W, SH459538		Prehistoric	CN373
	Small Fort Near Nantlle	Hillfort	Llanllyfni	53.0589°N 4.201°W, SH525535		Prehistoric	CN178
	Cromlech Farm Burial Chamber Four Crosses	Chambered tomb	Llannor	52.9199°N 4.3827°W, SH399384		Prehistoric	CN095
	Four Crosses Standing Stone	Standing stone	Llannor	52.9245°N 4.3814°W, SH400389		Prehistoric	CN105
	Standing Stone NW of Trallwyn	Standing stone	Llannor	52.9481°N 4.4133°W, SH379416		Prehistoric	CN155
	Tirgwyn Standing Stones	Standing stone	Llannor	52.9231°N 4.4645°W, SH344391		Prehistoric	CN097
	Caer Carreg y Fran	Hillfort	Llanrug	53.1419°N 4.1734°W, SH547627		Prehistoric	CN058
	Carreg Lefain Cairn	Round cairn	Llanrug	53.1325°N 4.1832°W, SH540617		Prehistoric	CN390
	Hut and Enclosure Near Mur-Moch	Unenclosed hut circle	Llanrug	53.1334°N 4.164°W, SH553617		Prehistoric	CN230
	Hut Circles NE of Garreg Lefain	Unenclosed hut circle	Llanrug	53.1319°N 4.1773°W, SH544616		Prehistoric	CN231
	Hut Group, Near Galltycelyn, S of Cwm-y-Glo	Unenclosed hut circle	Llanrug	53.1313°N 4.1659°W, SH551615		Prehistoric	CN228
	Parc y Gleision Standing Stone	Standing stone	Llanrug	53.1336°N 4.1732°W, SH547618		Prehistoric	CN392
	Ancient Village 270m West of Bod Angharad	Enclosed hut circle	Llanwnda	53.1028°N 4.2388°W, SH502585		Prehistoric	CN080
	Cae'r Odyn Unenclosed Hut	Unenclosed hut circle	Llanwnda	53.0909°N 4.2452°W, SH497572		Prehistoric	CN206
	Enclosed Hut Circle North-West of Tan Rhiw	Enclosed hut circle	Llanwnda	53.0855°N 4.2386°W, SH501565		Prehistoric	CN262
	Enclosed Hut Circle Settlement in Coed Glan-yr-Afon	Enclosed hut circle	Llanwnda	53.112°N 4.2377°W, SH503595		Prehistoric	CN267
	Enclosed Hut Circle Settlement North of Rhedynog Felen Bach	Enclosed hut circle	Llanwnda	53.0954°N 4.2931°W, SH465578		Prehistoric	CN278
	Hafotty Wern Las Hut Group & Fields	Unenclosed hut circle	Llanwnda	53.1003°N 4.2394°W, SH501582		Prehistoric	CN151
	Hafoty Ty-Newydd Enclosed Hut Group	Enclosed hut circle	Llanwnda	53.09°N 4.2458°W, SH497571		Prehistoric	CN205
	Hut Circle Settlement and Field System South-East of Erw	Enclosed hut circle settlement	Llanwnda	53.1027°N 4.2257°W, SH511586		Prehistoric	CN277
	Hut Circle Settlement East of Dinas-y-Prif	Enclosed hut circle	Llanwnda	53.0951°N 4.2952°W, SH464577		Prehistoric	CN212
	Hut Circle South of Cae'r Sais	Unenclosed hut circle	Llanwnda	53.09°N 4.241°W, SH500570		Prehistoric	CN266
	Hut Group and Field System E of Coed-y-Brain	Hut circle settlement	Llanwnda	53.0908°N 4.2505°W, SH493572		Prehistoric	CN152
	Carn Pentyrch Camp	Hillfort	Llanystumdwy	52.9502°N 4.3467°W, SH424417		Prehistoric	CN055
	Cefn-Isaf Burial Chamber	Chambered tomb	Llanystumdwy	52.9439°N 4.2584°W, SH483408		Prehistoric	CN003
	Standing Stone N of Bettws Fawr	Standing stone	Llanystumdwy	52.9408°N 4.2861°W, SH464406		Prehistoric	CN154
	Ystum-Cegid Burial Chamber	Chambered long cairn	Llanystumdwy	52.9482°N 4.2357°W, SH498413		Prehistoric	CN029
	Coed Nant-y-garth, standing stone to N of	Standing stone	Pentir	53.1915°N 4.1839°W, SH541682		Prehistoric	CN375
	Fodol Ganol Enclosed Hut Group	Enclosed hut circle	Pentir	53.1942°N 4.1712°W, SH550685		Prehistoric	CN175
	Goetre Uchaf barrow	Round barrow	Pentir	53.2065°N 4.1641°W, SH555699		Prehistoric	CN376
	Gors y Brithdir Enclosed Hut Group & Ancient Fields	Enclosed hut circle	Pentir	53.1972°N 4.1646°W, SH554688		Prehistoric	CN203
Approaching the Carnguwch cairn from the north	Carnguwch Cairn	Round cairn	Pistyll	52.9589°N 4.4213°W, SH374429		Prehistoric	CN043
	Hut Circles and Enclosure NW of Mount Pleasant	Hut circle settlement	Pistyll	52.9705°N 4.4569°W, SH351442		Prehistoric	CN249
	Hut Group North-East of Carnguwch Fawr	Hut group	Pistyll	52.9582°N 4.4129°W, SH380428		Prehistoric	CN256
	Moel Gwynus Standing Stone	Standing stone	Pistyll	52.9502°N 4.4635°W, SH345420		Prehistoric	CN394
	Yr Eifl Summit Cairns	Round cairn	Pistyll	52.975°N 4.4367°W, SH364447		Prehistoric	CN076
	Enclosed Hut Group in Parc-y-Borth	Enclosed hut circle	Porthmadog	52.9186°N 4.1401°W, SH562378		Prehistoric	CN270
Moel y Gest mountain	Moel y Gest Camp	Hillfort	Porthmadog	52.9278°N 4.16°W, SH549389	Summit hillfort above Porthmadog. Interesting accumulation of white quartz pebbles.	Prehistoric	CN059
	Enclosed Hut Group at Clogwyn Bach	Enclosed hut circle	Pwllheli	52.9089°N 4.4013°W, SH386372		Prehistoric	CN279
	Carn Fadryn Camp	Hillfort	Tudweiliog	52.8867°N 4.5579°W, SH280352		Prehistoric	CN011
	Cefnamwlch Burial Chamber	Chambered round cairn	Tudweiliog	52.8792°N 4.632°W, SH229345		Prehistoric	CN002
	Llangwnadl Standing Stone	Standing stone	Tudweiliog	52.8603°N 4.6627°W, SH208325		Prehistoric	CN114
	Nant y Gledrydd Standing Stone	Standing stone	Tudweiliog	52.8988°N 4.5389°W, SH293365		Prehistoric	CN395
	Dinas Camp	Promontory fort – coastal	Y Felinheli	53.1807°N 4.2177°W, SH518671		Prehistoric	CN047

Scheduled monuments in historic Caernarfonshire, Gwynedd, Wales.
=Religious, Ritual and Funerary
=Domestic
=Defence

== See also ==
- List of Cadw properties
- List of castles in Wales
- List of hill forts in Wales
- Historic houses in Wales
- List of monastic houses in Wales
- List of museums in Wales
- List of Roman villas in Wales
