= Llangelynin railway station =

Former railway station in Gwynedd, Wales

Llangelynin

General information
- Location: Llangelynin, Gwynedd; Wales
- Coordinates: 52.6442°N 4.1132°W
- Platforms: 1

Other information
- Status: Disused

History
- Post-grouping: Great Western Railway

Key dates
- 7 July 1930: Opened
- 25 October 1991: Closed
Location

Llangelynin station was a single-platform halt on the Cambrian Line, which served the small village of Llangelynin in Gwynedd, Wales. It was opened in 1930 by the Great Western Railway and was known as Llangelynin Halt.

It was closed by British Rail in 1991; all stations had to be lit at night on safety grounds and it was deemed not worth the upgrade. Train services were officially "suspend[ed] ... until further notice" with effect from 25 October 1991; the "unsafe condition of the platform" was given as the reason. The line is still open, but trains no longer call at the station.

Preceding station	Historical railways	Following station
Llwyngwril; Line and station open	Great Western Railway; Aberystwith and Welsh Coast Railway	Tonfanau; Line and station open
