= Caer Euni =

Hillfort in Gwynedd, Wales

- Location within Gwynedd
- 52°57′35″N 3°29′21″W
- Type: Hillfort
- Periods: Iron Age
- Location: Near Llandderfel, Wales
- OS grid reference: SJ 00027 41266

Site notes
- Height: 365 metres (1,198 ft)
- Length: 216 metres (709 ft)
- Width: 58 metres (190 ft)

Caer Euni (Grid reference SJ 00027 41266) is an Iron Age hillfort, about 2.5 miles (4 km) north-east of the village of Llandderfel and about 5 miles (8 km) north-east of Llyn Tegid (Bala Lake), in Gwynedd, Wales. It is a scheduled monument.

== Description ==
The fort is situated on a narrow ridge, at height 365 metres (1,198 ft). It is an elongated enclosure, length about 216 metres (709 ft) and width 58 metres (190 ft), orientated north-east to south-west, aligned with the ridge.

There is a rampart enclosing the inner area, with a steep slope to the south-east and ditches and counterscarps elsewhere. The principal entrance is in the north-east. The fort was enlarged: there is a bank, formerly the south-west end, traceable across the interior, and further defences were built to the south-west, notably a large rock-cut ditch and a rampart built with the stone from the ditch.

The sites of about 25 round huts, diameter 15–20 feet (4.6–6.1 m), have been detected, mostly in the later part of the enclosure.

There are some burnt stones in the south-west corner, but this is not thought to be evidence of a connection with the vitrified forts of Scotland.

== See also ==
- Hillforts in Britain
- List of Scheduled prehistoric Monuments in Gwynedd (former Merionethshire)
