= Dyffryn Ardudwy =

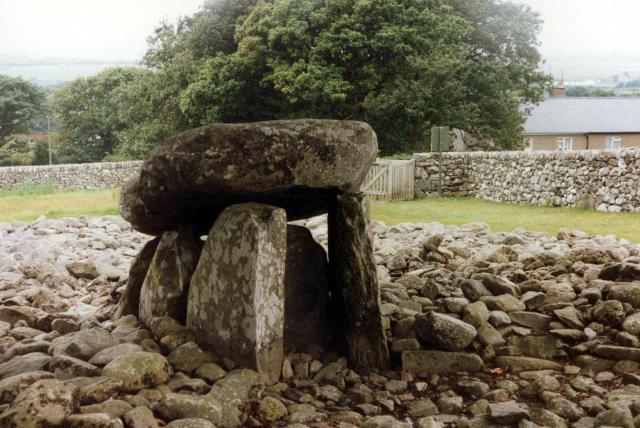
- Chambered cairn (portal dolmen) Dyffryn Ardudwy

- Location within Gwynedd
- Population: 1,540 (2011)
- OS grid reference: SH585235
- Community: Dyffryn Ardudwy
- Principal area: Gwynedd
- Preserved county: Gwynedd
- Country: Wales
- Sovereign state: United Kingdom
- Post town: TALYBONT
- Postcode district: LL43
- Post town: DYFFRYN ARDUDWY
- Postcode district: LL44
- Dialling code: 01341
- Police: North Wales
- Fire: North Wales
- Ambulance: Welsh
- UK Parliament: Dwyfor Meirionnydd
- Senedd Cymru – Welsh Parliament: Dwyfor Meirionnydd
- List of places UK Wales Gwynedd 52.788°N 4.096°W Map of the community

Dyffryn Ardudwy (Welsh pronunciation: [ˌdəfrɨ̞n arˈdɨ̞duːɨ̯];) is a village, community and electoral ward in the Ardudwy area of Gwynedd, Wales. It comprises several small, almost conjoined, villages including Coed Ystumgwern, Llanenddwyn (Welsh pronunciation), Llanddwywe, Talybont and Dyffryn Ardudwy. It is situated on the main A496 coast road between Harlech and Barmouth. The ward had a population of 1,540 according to the 2011 census.

== Geography ==
The village of Dyffryn Ardudwy is situated on the A496 coastal road between the towns of Harlech and Barmouth and at the foot of Moelfre, part of the Rhinogydd range. The village has a railway station and a long sandy beach backed by sand dunes. A small river, Afon Ysgethin, flows through the area of the community, crossed by two very old bridges: Pont Scethin and Pont Fadog.

== History ==
There are a number of prehistoric cromlechs in and around the village, and they are some of the earliest tombs erected on these islands. Dating from around 4000 BC, the cairn at Dyffryn Ardudwy has two separate burial chambers. One of these is a type known as a portal dolmen. A flat slab on the mountainside was used as a base, this was flanked by several other slabs, side-stones and back-stones. A capstone was placed on top and a small ovoid cairn of stones built around three sides. The fourth side was the portal and had a small forecourt. Here a pit was dug and in it were formally arranged several flat stones, various shards of pottery from at least four pots, charcoal and soil. The pit was then filled with the cairn material and the mound completed.

Near Dyffryn Ardudwy is an avenue which was built by the powerful Vaughan dynasty, (who were instrumental in placing Henry VII on the English throne in 1485), to connect their family mansion, Cors-y-gedol (The Bog of Hospitality), with the family chapel. The existing mansion was built in 1576. It is Grade II* listed house, set in parkland which is designated Grade II on the Cadw/ICOMOS Register of Parks and Gardens of Special Historic Interest in Wales. Nearby, the Cors-y-gedol burial chamber stands amidst the site of ancient fields and settlements and the area affords glorious views of Cardigan Bay.

St Dwywe's Church at Llanddwywe, within the community of Dyffryn Ardudwy, was built on an ancient mound which is at the end of the straight line followed by the road to Cors-y-gedol Hall. This line runs straight and true to a cairn on the side of Moelfre, and it is suggested that this is a prehistoric man-made creation relating to the summer solstice rather than a more recent addition. The church is a Grade II listed building.

== Facilities ==
The village has a railway station served by the Cambrian Line. The village had a golf club during the early to mid-1900s. The village is home to The Boys Brigade West Midland District Camping Centre. This provides canvas holidays for young people from all over the UK.

== Education ==
Ysgol Gynradd Dyffryn Ardudwy provides Welsh-medium primary education to Dyffryn Ardudwy and the nearby village of Tal-y-bont. As of 2022, there were 83 pupils enrolled at the school. In 2022, approximately 23% of statutory school age pupils were from Welsh-speaking homes.

In terms of secondary education, the village is in the catchment area of Ysgol Ardudwy in Harlech.

== Gallery ==
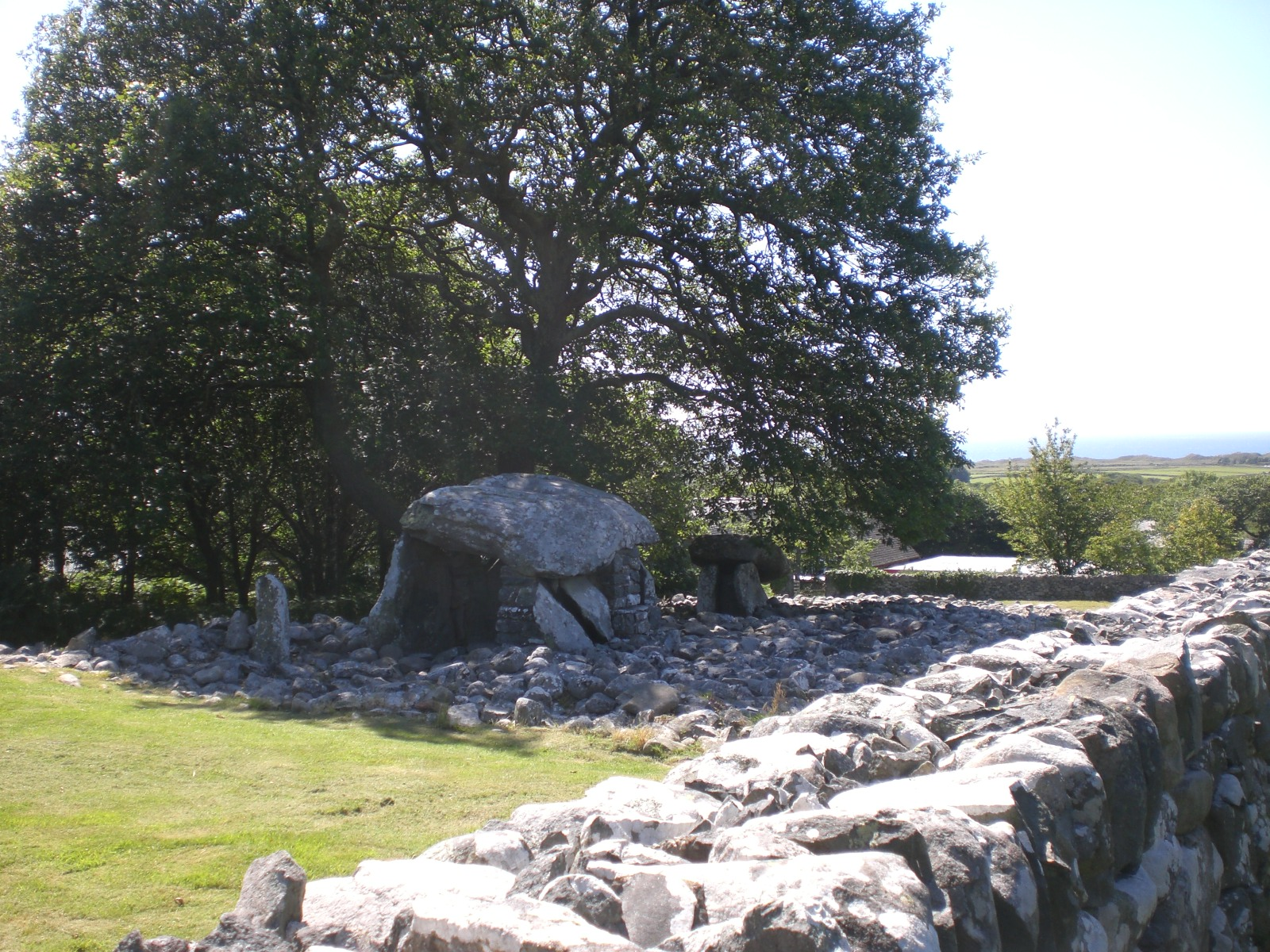
Burial chamber outskirts

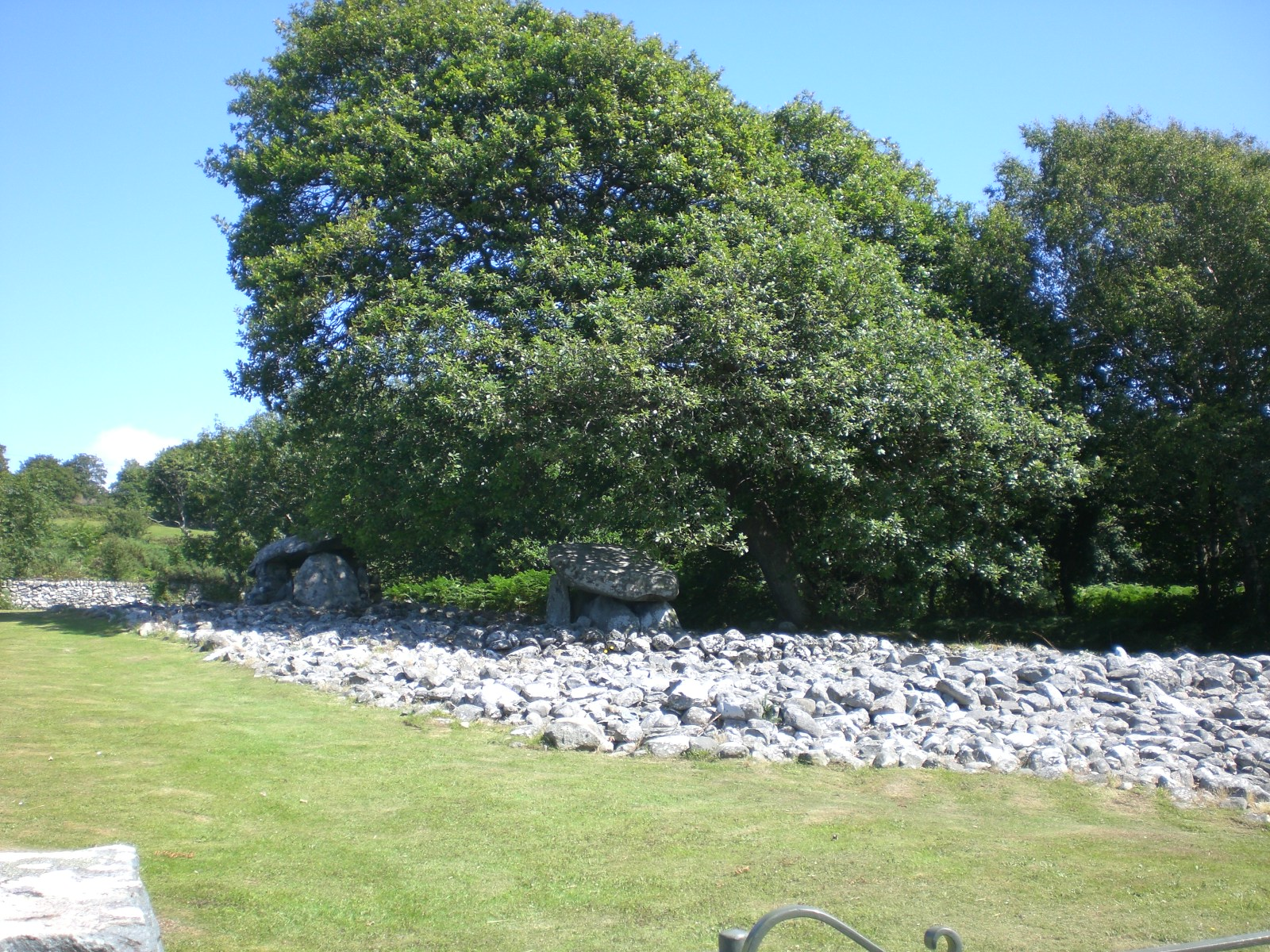
Burial chamber view

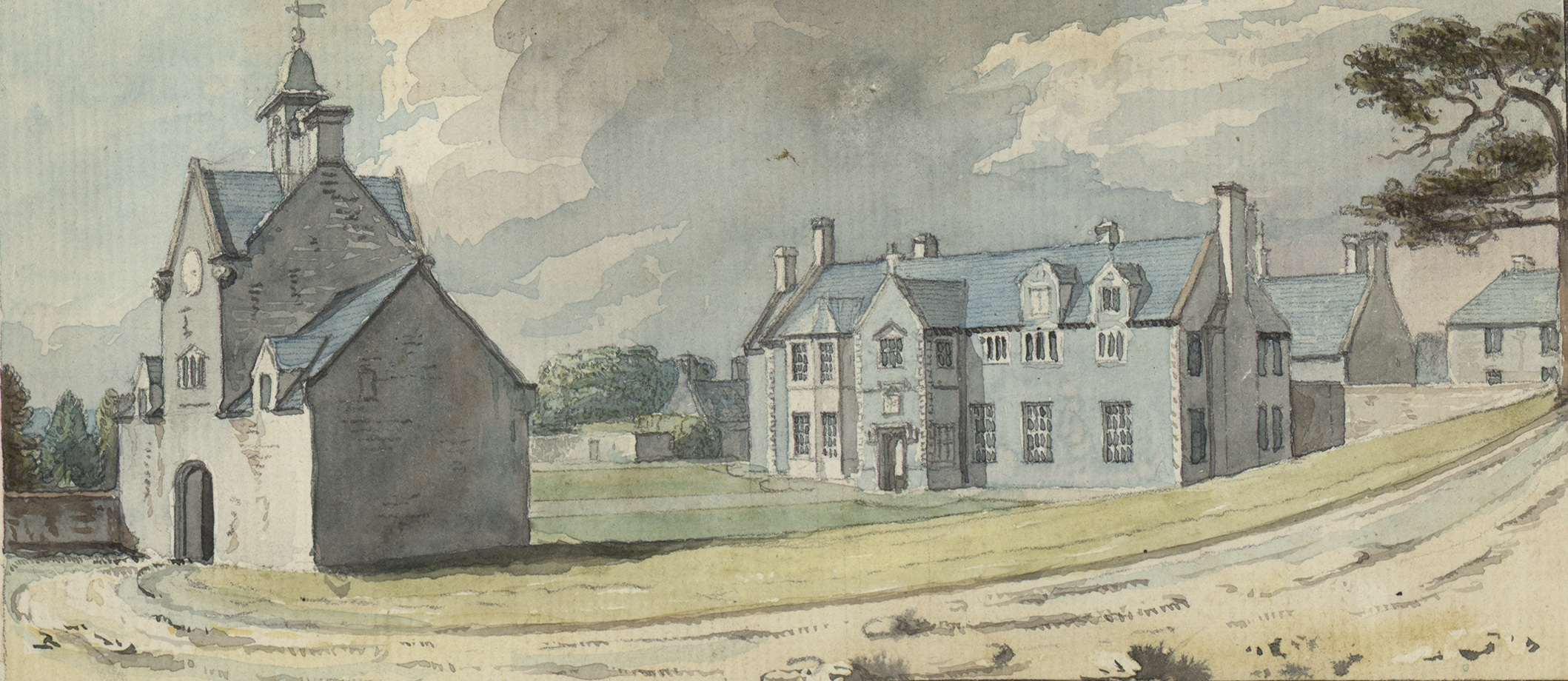
Cors-y-gedol Mansion around 1780

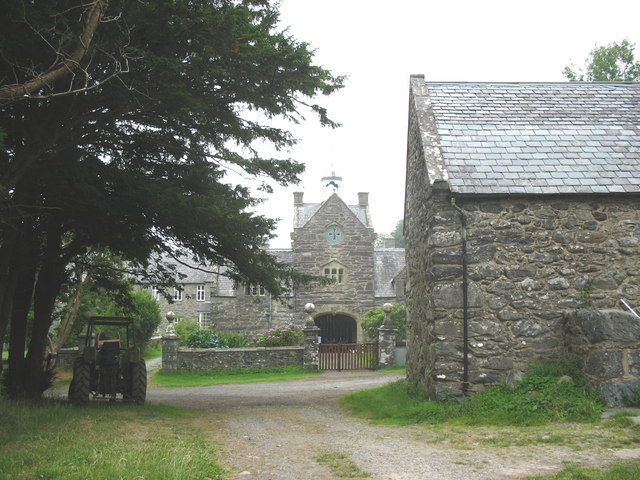
Cors-y-gedol gatehouse

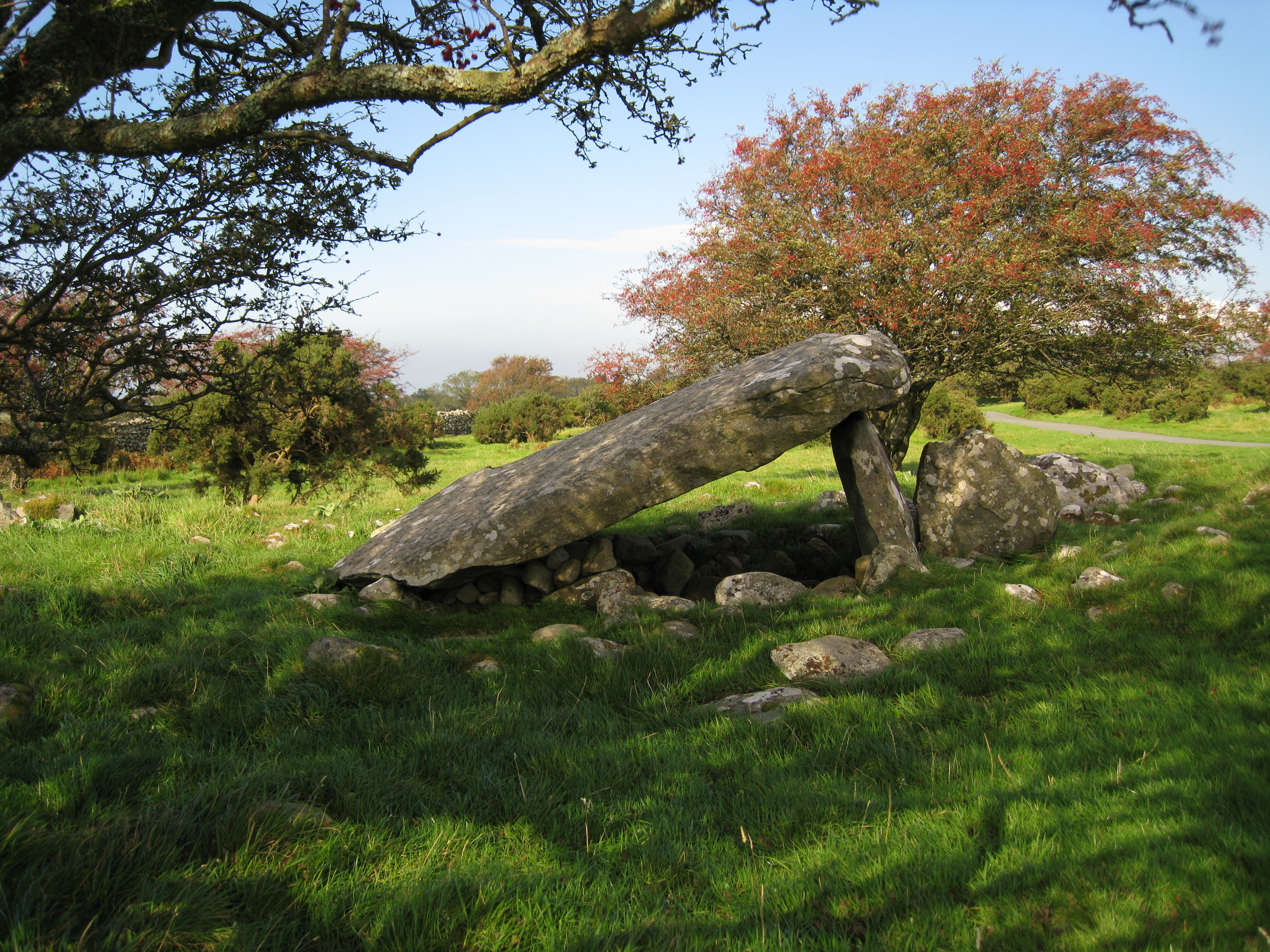
Cors-y-gedol burial chamber

== See also ==
- Barmouth
- Llanaber
- List of Cadw properties
- List of Scheduled prehistoric Monuments in Gwynedd (former Merionethshire)
