= Llangelynnin, Gwynedd =

Village in Gwynedd, Wales

Llangelynnin
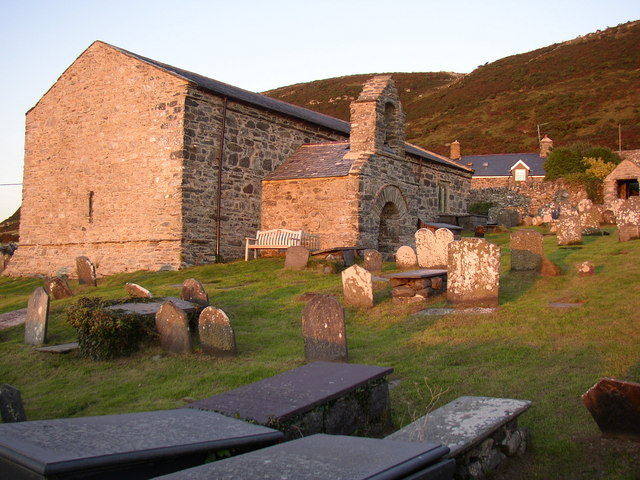
- St Celynnin's Church

- Location within Gwynedd
- Population: 673 (2011)
- OS grid reference: SH570071
- Community: Llangelynnin
- Principal area: Gwynedd
- Country: Wales
- Sovereign state: United Kingdom
- Post town: TYWYN
- Postcode district: LL36
- Post town: LLWYNGWRIL
- Postcode district: LL37
- Dialling code: 01654
- Police: North Wales
- Fire: North Wales
- Ambulance: Welsh
- UK Parliament: Dwyfor Meirionnydd
- Senedd Cymru – Welsh Parliament: Dwyfor Meirionnydd
- List of places UK Wales Gwynedd 52.643°N 4.112°W Map of the community

Llangelynnin (Welsh pronunciation; also Llangelynin) is a small village and community near Tywyn, Gwynedd, Wales. Although the village is usually known as Llangelynnin in English, the community name previously used was Llangelynin, though it is now also spelt "Llangelynnin".

== St Celynnin's Church ==
The parish church is dedicated to Saint Celynnin. The church dates from the 13th century and was extensively restored and probably extended in the late 15th or early 16th centuries. It had minor restorations in the 19th and 20th centuries but retains most of its medieval character. There is a 17th-century porch and bellcote at the south end, with a bell inscribed with the date 1660.

The interior of the church includes 17th-century wall paintings with texts and a skeletal figure. The benches date from about 1823 and record the names, addresses and occupations of their 19th-century occupants. Richard Haslam, Julian Orbach and Adam Voelcker, in their Gwynedd volume of the Buildings of Wales series, call it "one of Caernarvonshire's least disturbed interiors".

The church is disused, and is a Grade I listed building.

== Location, history and amenities ==
Llangelynnin sits on a slope above Cardigan Bay to the north of Tywyn. The A493 road and Cambrian Coast railway pass through the village, although the railway station closed in 1991.

The poet and scholar John Morgan was born in the village and Abram Wood, a famous Welsh gypsy, was buried there in 1799.

The community of Llangelynnin includes the larger village of Llwyngwril, the village of Tonfanau and the hamlet of Rhoslefain within its boundaries. It has an area of 2,154 hectares and a population of 708 (2001 census), reducing to 673 at the 2011 census.

== Governance ==
An electoral ward in the same name exists. This ward includes the community of Arthog with a total population at the 2011 census of 2,008.

== Sources ==
- Haslam, Richard; Orbach, Julian; Voelcker, Adam (2009). Gwynedd. The Buildings of Wales. New Haven and London: Yale University Press. ISBN 978-0-300-14169-6. OCLC 1023292902.
