= Llanwnda, Gwynedd =

Village in Gwynedd, Wales

Llanwnda
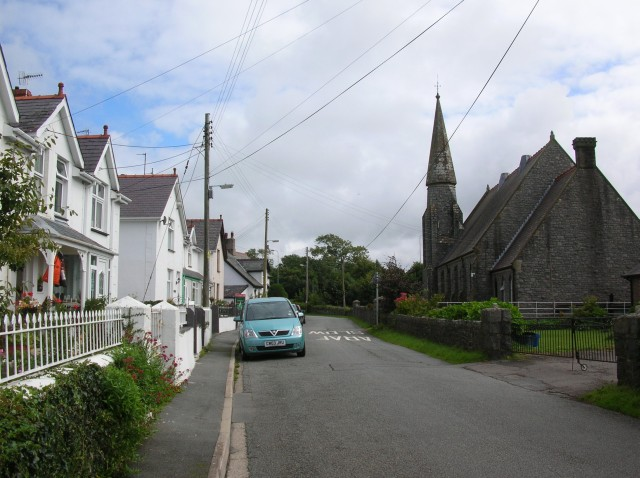
- Glanrhyd, in the community of Llanwnda

- Location within Gwynedd
- Population: 1,994 (2011)
- OS grid reference: SH475584
- Community: Llanwnda
- Principal area: Gwynedd
- Country: Wales
- Sovereign state: United Kingdom
- Post town: CAERNARFON
- Postcode district: LL54
- Dialling code: 01286
- Police: North Wales
- Fire: North Wales
- Ambulance: Welsh
- UK Parliament: Dwyfor Meirionnydd
- Senedd Cymru – Welsh Parliament: Arfon
- List of places UK Wales Gwynedd 53.101°N 4.278°W Map of the community

Llanwnda is a village, community and electoral ward in Gwynedd, Wales. The community has a population of 1,994 as taken at the 2011 Census. It is situated about 3 miles (5 km) to the south of Caernarfon, and 5 miles (8 km) south-west of Llanrug. According to the 2011 Census, 81.6% of the population were Welsh speakers. The community includes the slate mining villages of Rhosgadfan and Rhostryfan.
