= Hut circle =

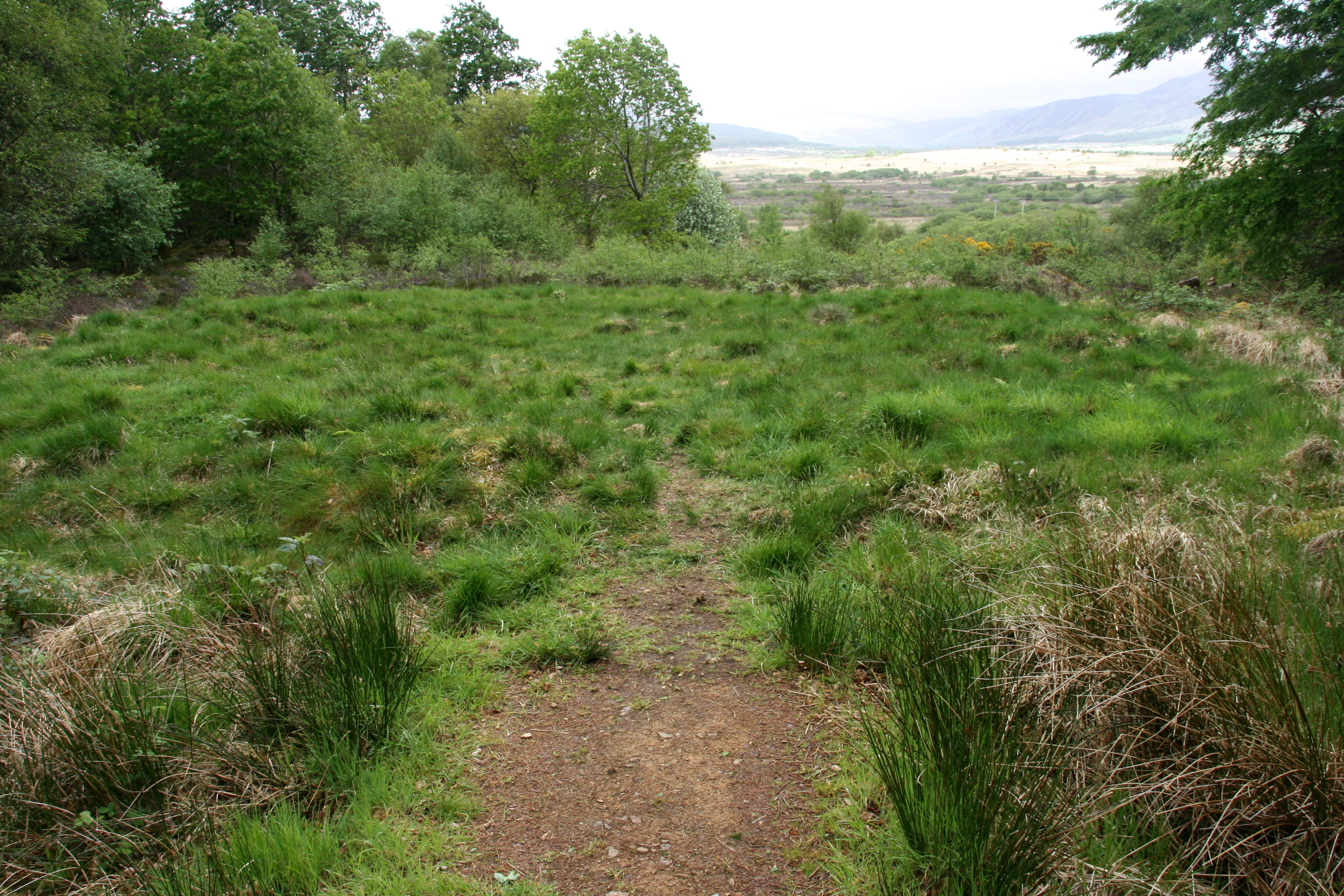
A hut circle in Torr Righ, Arran, Scotland

In archaeology, a hut circle is a circular or oval depression in the ground which may or may not have a low stone wall around it that used to be the foundation of a round house. The superstructure of such a house would have been made of timber and thatch. They are numerous in parts of upland Britain and most date to around the 2nd century BC.

Hut circles are usually around 5 to 25 feet (1.5 to 7.6 m) in internal diameter, the rocks themselves being 2–3 feet (0.61–0.91 m) wide and around 3 feet (0.91 m) high. Hut circles were also almost certainly covered by conical rounded roofs and supported by posts that were internal and sometimes external.

== Wales ==
There are more than 100 registered hut circles and enclosures in Wales. They are to be found in areas which have not been ploughed and the stones have not been disturbed. They are quite common in the north.

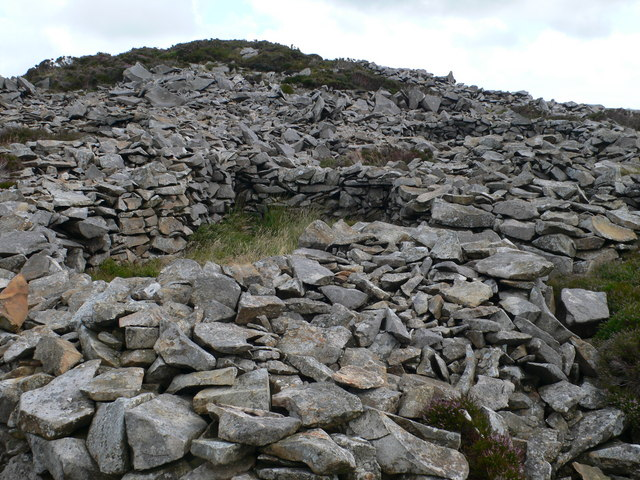
Tre'r Ceiri Celtic Iron Age hut circle

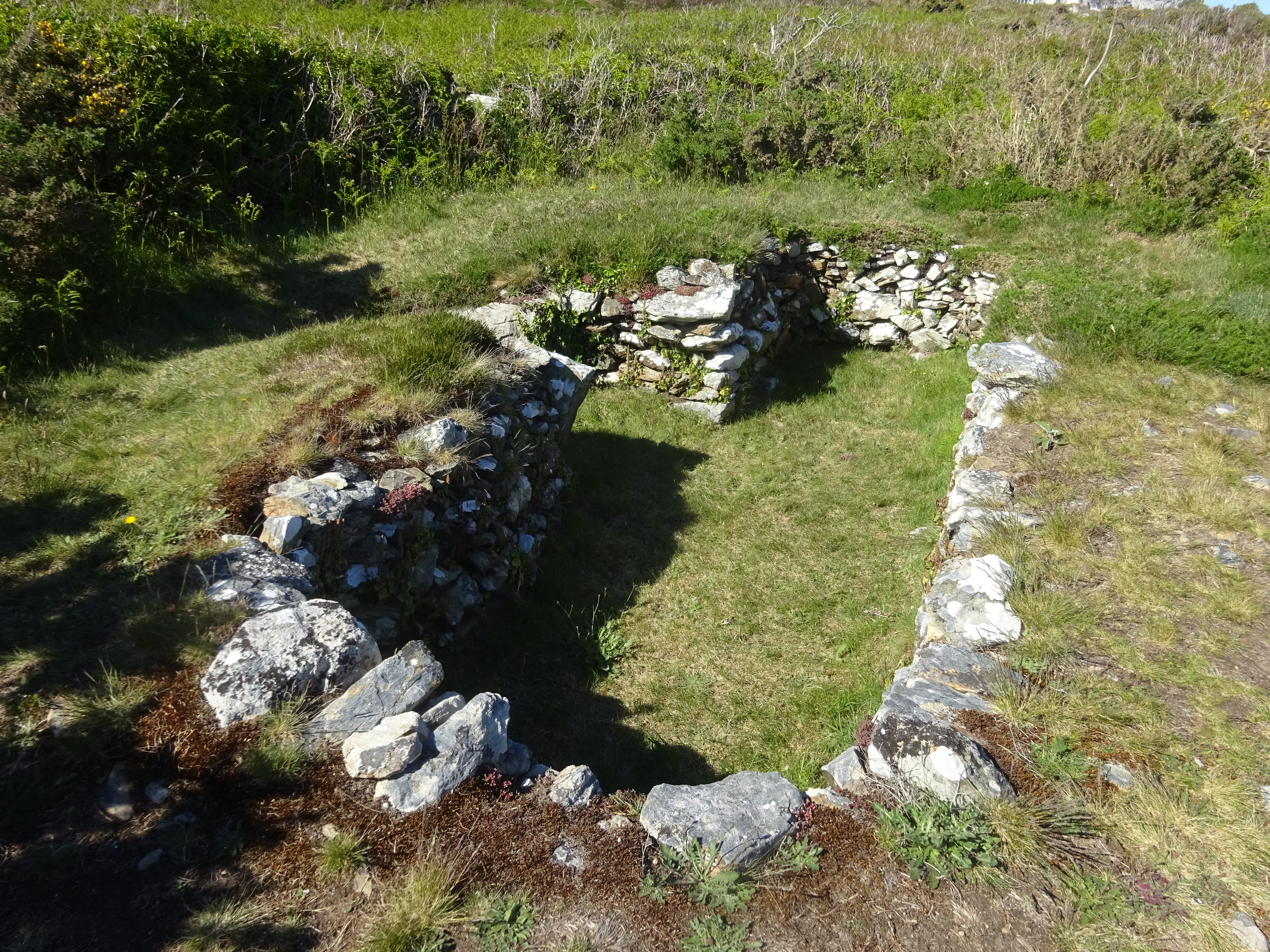
Holyhead Mountain Hut Circles

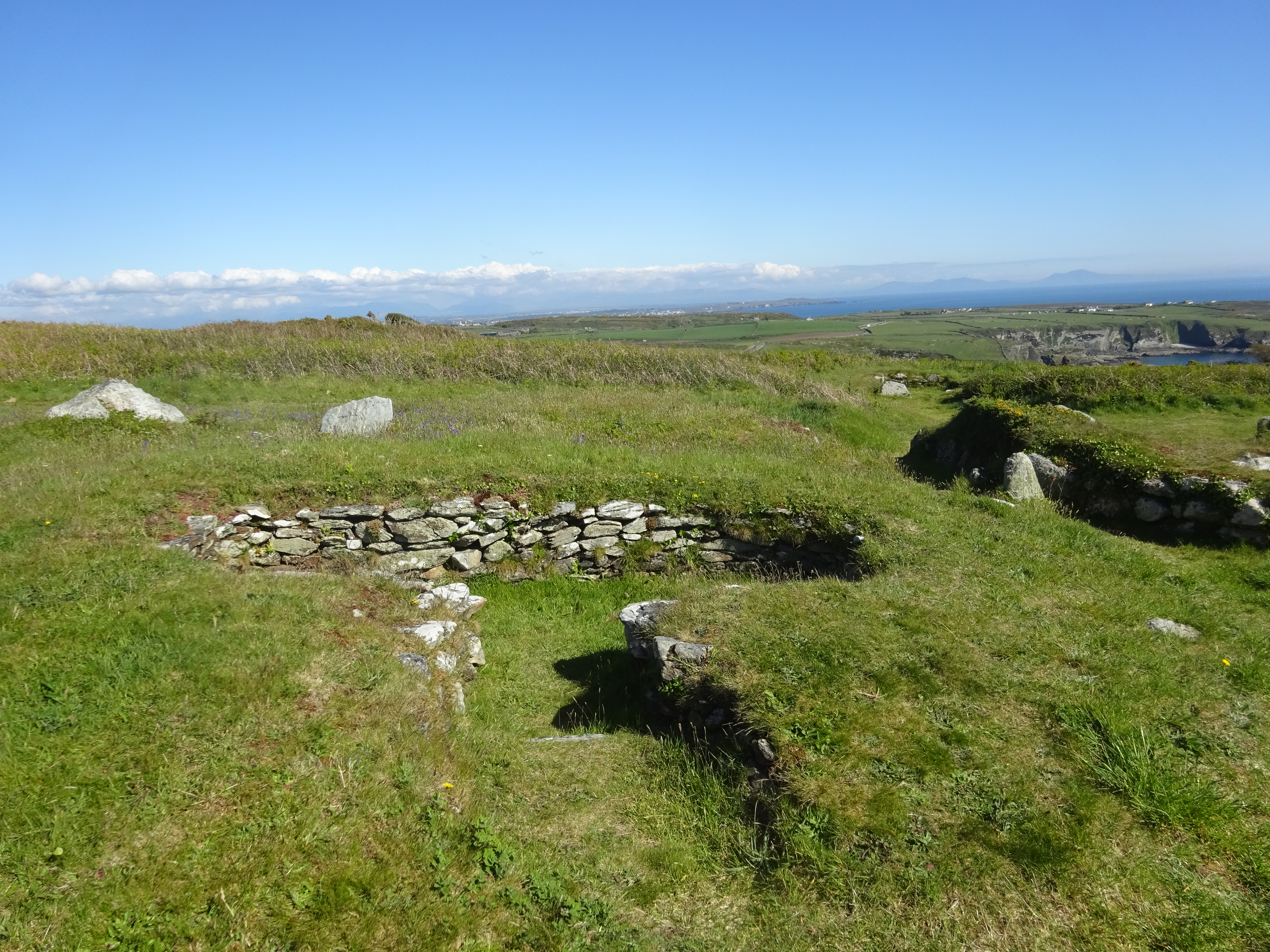
Holyhead Mountain Hut Circles

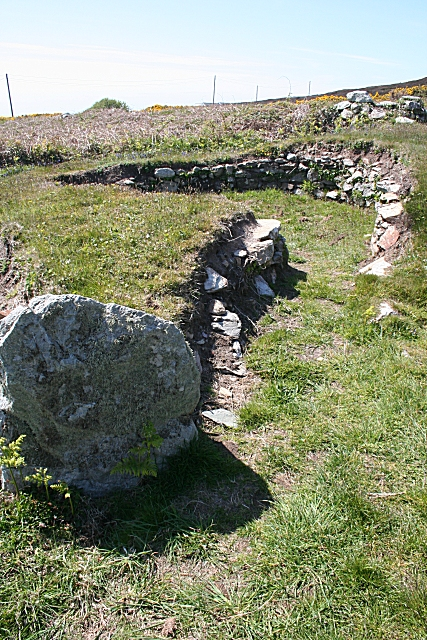
Trearddur hut circles

Din Lligwy hut circles

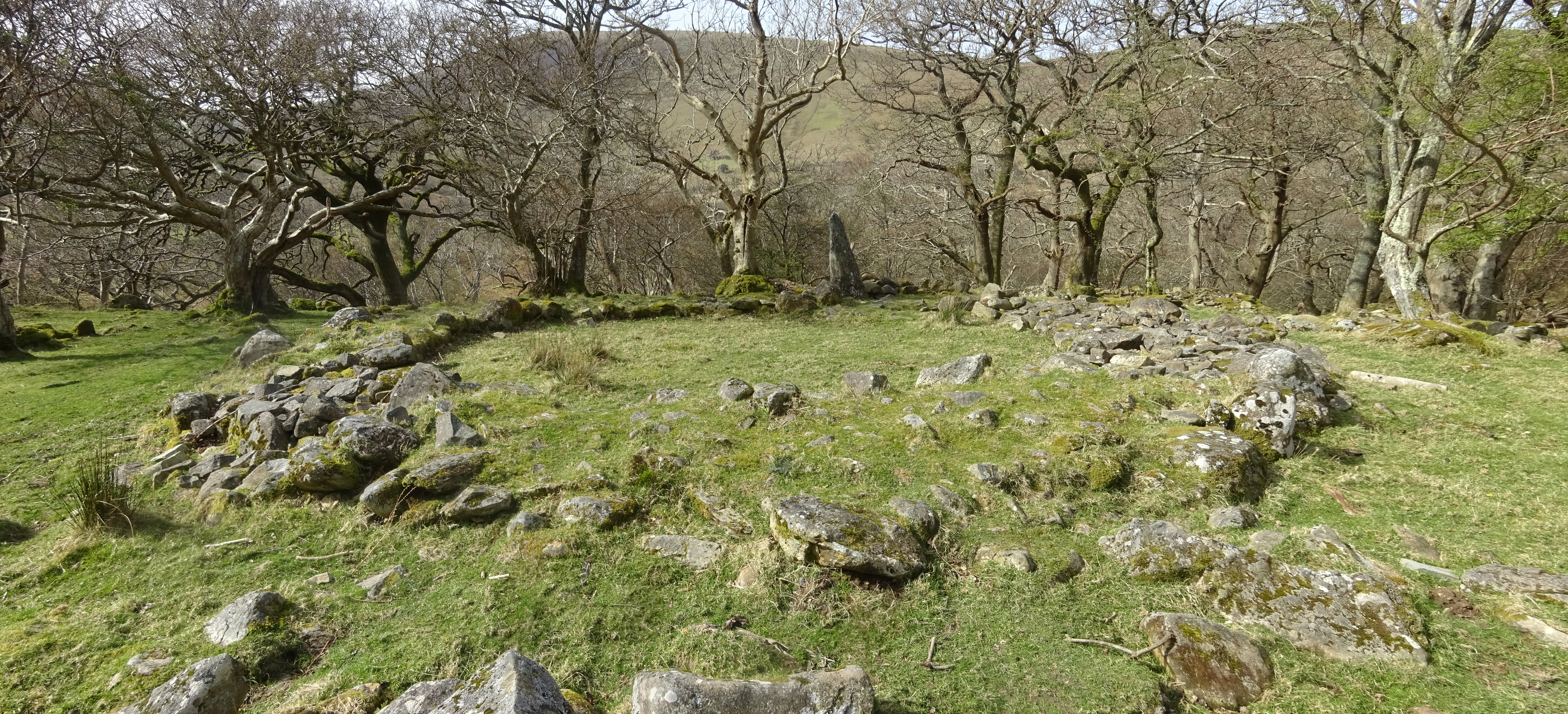
Hut circle near Aber Falls, Conwy

== England ==
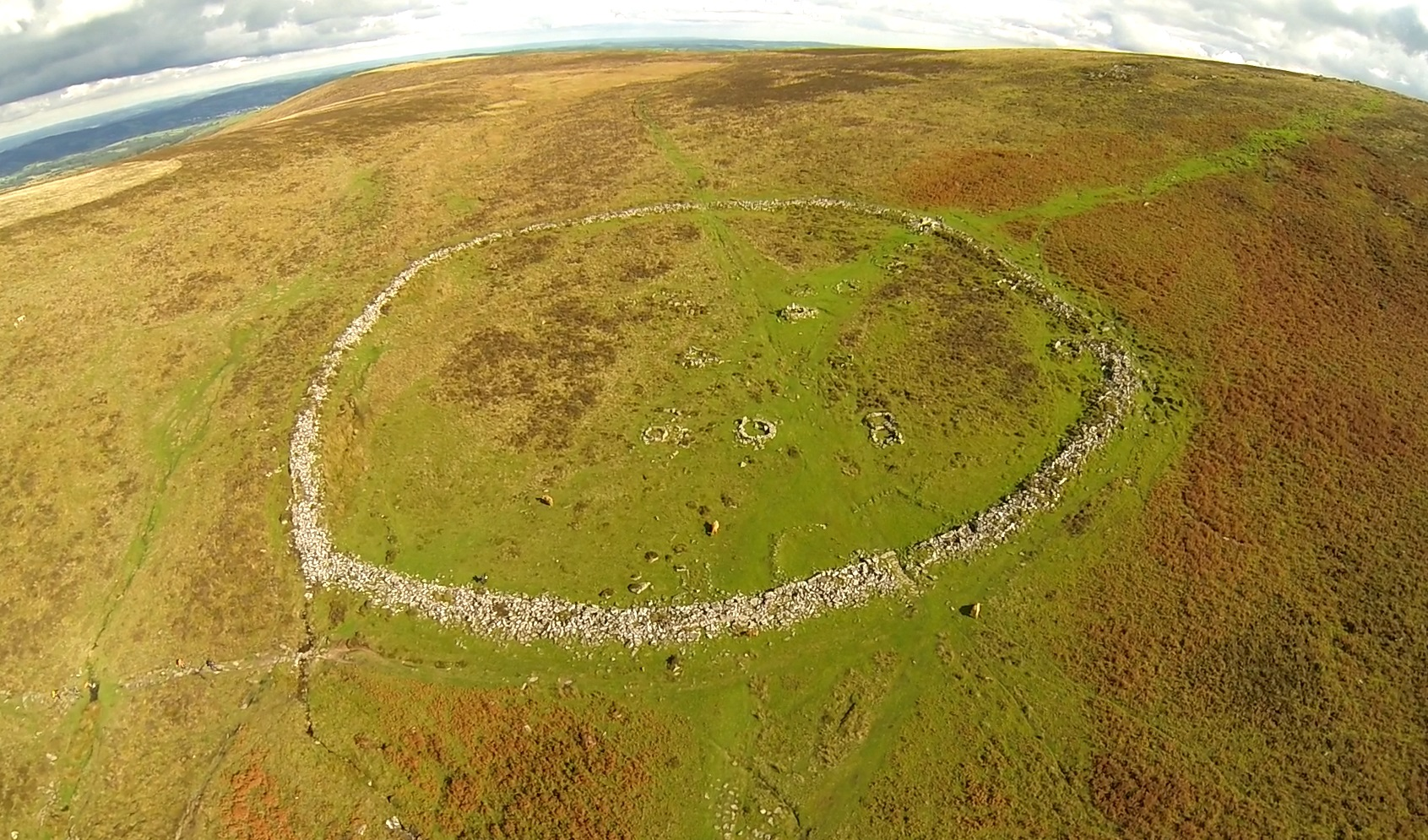
Grimspound on Dartmoor, a late Bronze Age settlement

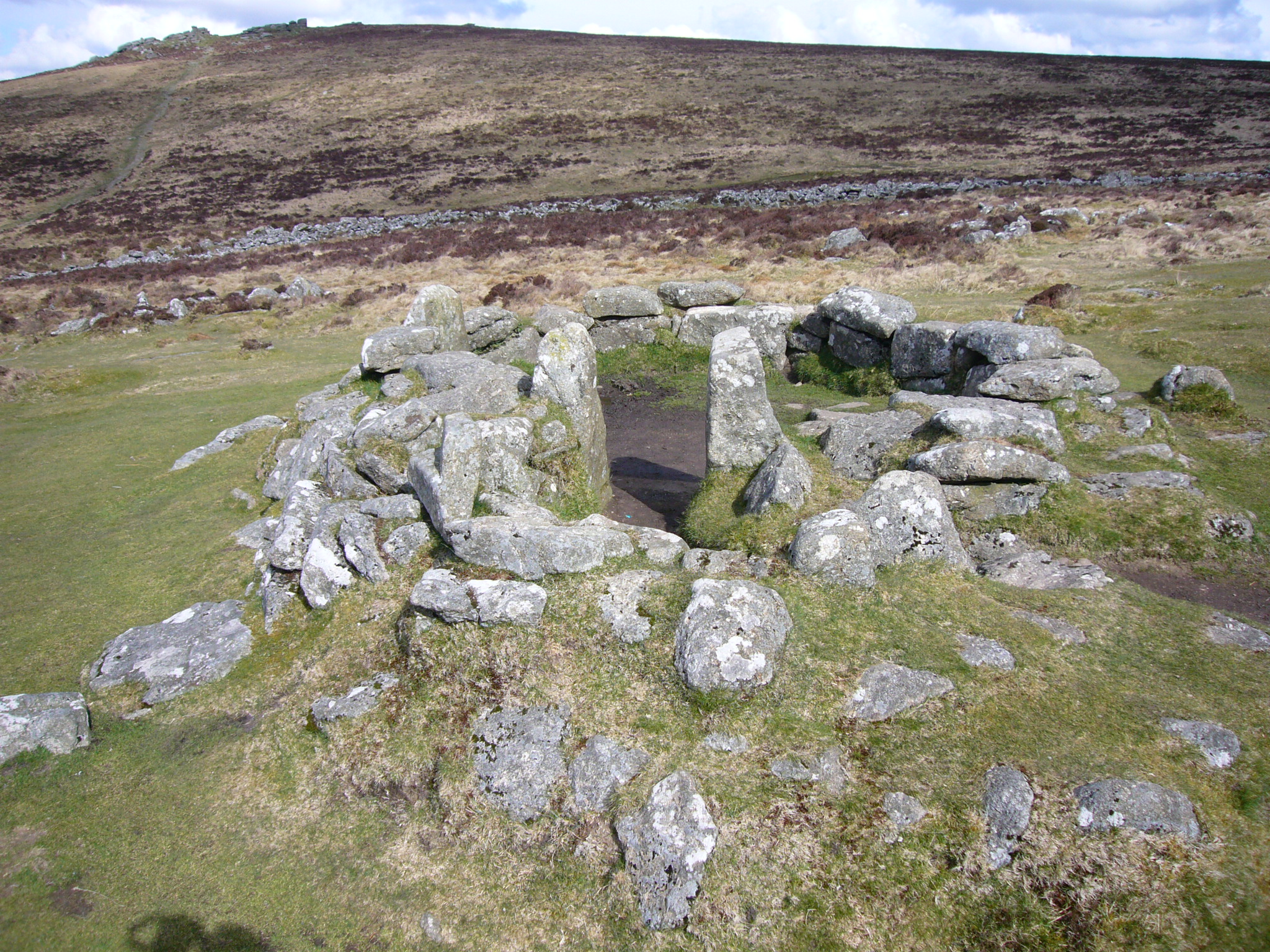
One of Grimspound's hut circles

Hut circles are particularly numerous on Dartmoor, where there are an estimated 5,000. One of the best-known sites is Grimspound, which is exceptionally well preserved owing to its solid stone construction, the numerous hut circles being enclosed by a stone wall. It dates to the Late Bronze Age. It was first settled about 1300 BC. The 24 hut circles are surrounded by a massive granite perimeter wall, which may have stood 5 feet 7 inches (1.7 m) tall in places. The roundhouses, with an average diameter of 11 feet (3.4 m), were each built of a double ring of granite slabs with a rubble infill – a technique still used in dry-stone walling. One, Hut 3, has a surviving porchway, with the two jamb stones still upright, although the lintel has fallen. There is good evidence of human activity: pottery, scrapers, and pot boilers were found in the huts during Victorian excavations. However, few organic artefacts survived in the acidic soil. Ashes were found at a central hearth in each hut.

At Halangy Down in the Isles of Scilly are the remains of an Iron Age village composed of round houses below the Bant's Carn Bronze Age burial chamber.

== Scotland ==
Hut circles also occur in Northern Scotland, but it is unclear whether there is a connection between these and the hut circles in England. These hut circles were usually in pairs, and surrounded by groups of tumuli of sepulchral origin. These hut circles were around 40 feet (12 m) in diameter and 20–30 yards (18–27 m) apart.
