= Ring cairn =

Ring bank enclosure

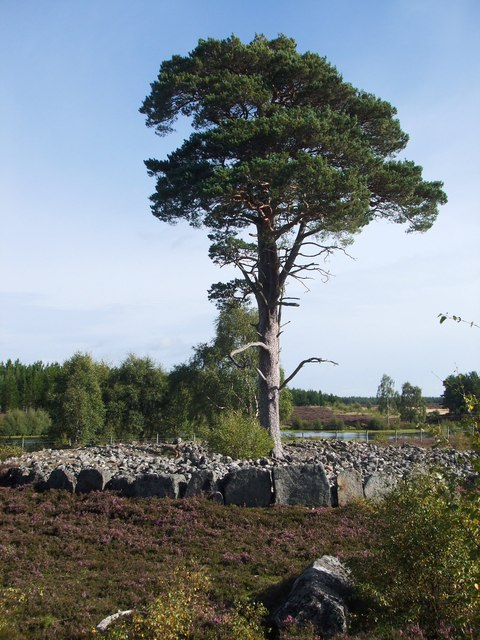
Greenish Ring Cairn

A ring cairn (also correctly termed a ring bank enclosure, but sometimes wrongly described as a ring barrow) is a circular or slightly oval, ring-shaped, low (maximum 0.5 metres high) embankment, several metres wide and from 8 to 20 metres in diameter. It is made of stone and earth and was originally empty in the centre. In several cases the middle of the ring was later used (at Hound Tor, for example, there is a stone cist in the centre). The low profile of these cairns is not always possible to make out without conducting excavations.

== Distribution ==
These sites date to the Bronze Age and occur in Cornwall, Derbyshire (Barbrook IV and V and Green Low) in England; and in Scotland, Wales and Ireland.

== Description ==
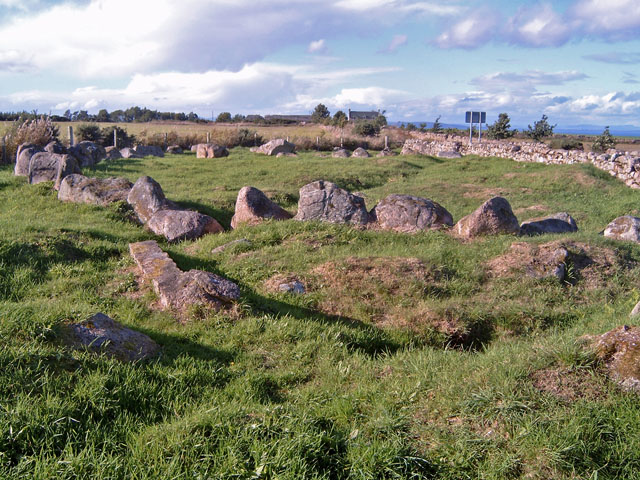
Ring cairn near Mains of Moyness

The cairns look like flat variants of the significantly higher Clava cairns, which are often called ring cairns by laymen. The situation is rather different on the gritstones of the Eastern Uplands. Here it is more common to find smaller stone circles and ring cairns. The patterned relationship of these smaller monuments to cairnfield systems throughout the Eastern Moors suggests that they were built and used by specific communities, probably in the centuries around 2000 BC. Although details vary from one site to another, nearly all comprise a ring of small upright stones set on the inner edge of a roughly circular bank.

== Function ==
Ring cairns may have had a function that lay somewhere between that of the much older henges and the contemporary stone circles. In northeast Scotland the recumbent stone circles seem to have encircled a cairn and typically it was a ring cairn, as distinct from a Clava cairn. In some instances, in particular at Tomnaverie stone circle, the cairn was built before the circle according to an overall design. Usually all superficial trace of the cairns has disappeared over the millennia. The fact that in southeast Wales there are so few stone circles could be related to the fact that ring cairns were built there instead.

Although graves have been found in some ring cairns, this does not appear to be their original purpose. In the central area, graves and pits with cremation ashes, fireplaces and sometimes, small, low cairns are found.

The slightly oval ring cairns near Arthur's Stone on the Gower Peninsula show that the inner edges of ring cairns were especially carefully constructed and were set in front of a small grave. Originally there was a passage through the ring here, about ten metres across, that was blocked when the cairn ceased to be used.

== See also ==
- Tor cairn

== Literature ==
- F. Lynch: Ring cairns and related monuments in Wales. In: Scottish Archaeological Forum. 4, 1972 S. 61–80
- F. Lynch: Ring cairns in Britain and Ireland: their design and purpose. In: Ulster Journal of Archaeology. 42, 1979 S. 1–19
