= Bro Rhosyr =

Electoral ward in Anglesey, Wales

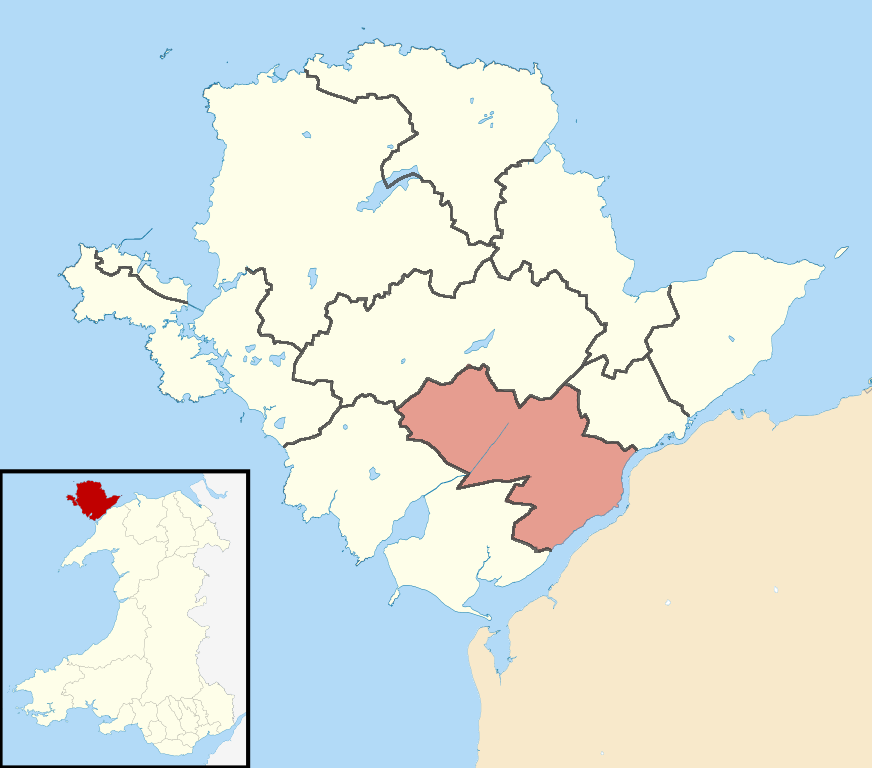
Bro Rhosyr ward location on Anglesey

Bro Rhosyr is an electoral ward in the south of Anglesey, Wales, created in 2012.

Bro Rhosyr includes the communities of Llanidan (Brynsiencyn), Llanfihangel Ysgeifiog (Gaerwen), Llanddaniel-fab and Llangristiolus. The ward elects two county councillors to the Isle of Anglesey County Council. Bro Aberffraw ward lies to the southwest while the Aethwy ward lies to the northeast. Canolbarth Môn borders to the north.

Bro Rhosyr was created following the Isle of Anglesey electoral boundary changes in 2012, which created 11 multi-councillor wards from 40 single-councillor wards. The new ward replaced the former Llanidan county ward and parts of the wards of Bodffordd, Bodorgan and Llanfihangel Ysgeifiog which had each elected their own county councillor.

== Elections results ==
Following the inaugural May 2013 county elections the ward was represented by two Independent councillors, Victor Hughes and Hywel Eifion Jones, on a turnout of 52.8%.

At the May 2017 county elections, the ward was won by two new Independent councillors, Dafydd Roberts and Eric Wyn Jones.

== See also ==
- Rhosyr (cantref)
