= Braint =

Former electoral ward in Anglesey, Wales

Coordinates: 53.222°N 4.200°W

Braint (privilege, right, honour, or status)was the name of one of the 40 wards of the Isle of Anglesey County Council, covering part of the area of the community of Llanfairpwllgwyngyll.

The ward contained 1,173 electors in 2007. The population of the ward was 1,517 at the 2011 Census.

Following the 2012 Isle of Anglesey electoral boundary changes Braint (and Llanfair PG) became part of a larger Aethwy county council ward though it remains a community ward of Llanfair PG.
