= Twrcelyn =

Electoral ward in Anglesey, Wales

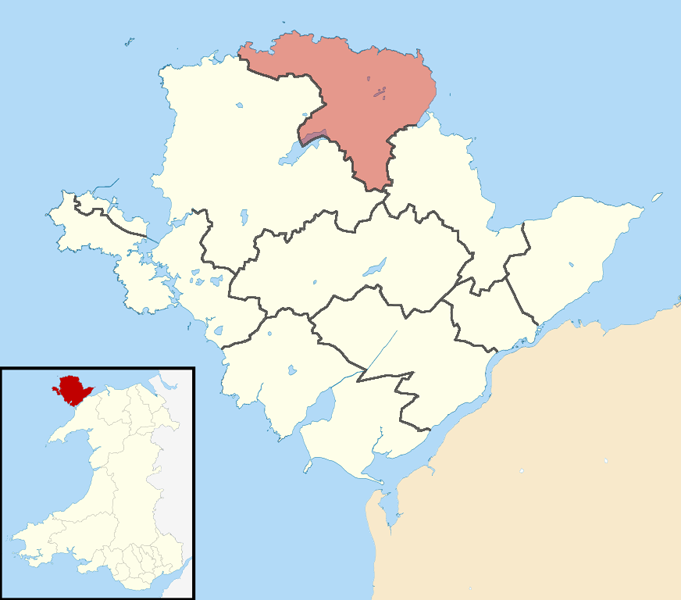
Twrcelyn ward location on Anglesey

Twrcelyn is an electoral ward in the north of Anglesey, Wales. It includes the communities of Amlwch, Llanbadrig, Llaneilian, and Rhosybol. Twrcelyn elects three county councillors to the Isle of Anglesey County Council.

Twrcelyn was created following the Isle of Anglesey electoral boundary changes in 2012, which created 11 multi-councillor wards from 40 single-councillor wards. Prior to this Twrcelyn was covered by the Amlwch Port, Amlwch Rural, Llanbadrig and Llaneilian county wards which each elected their own county councillor.

Since the May 2017 county elections, the ward has been represented by Liberal Democrat councillor Aled Jones and two Independent councillors, Richard Jones and Richard Griffiths.
