= 2017 United Kingdom local elections =

- 4 May 2017

88 of 404 councils in Great Britain 1 sui generis authority 8 directly elected mayors
- Turnout: 35.3%
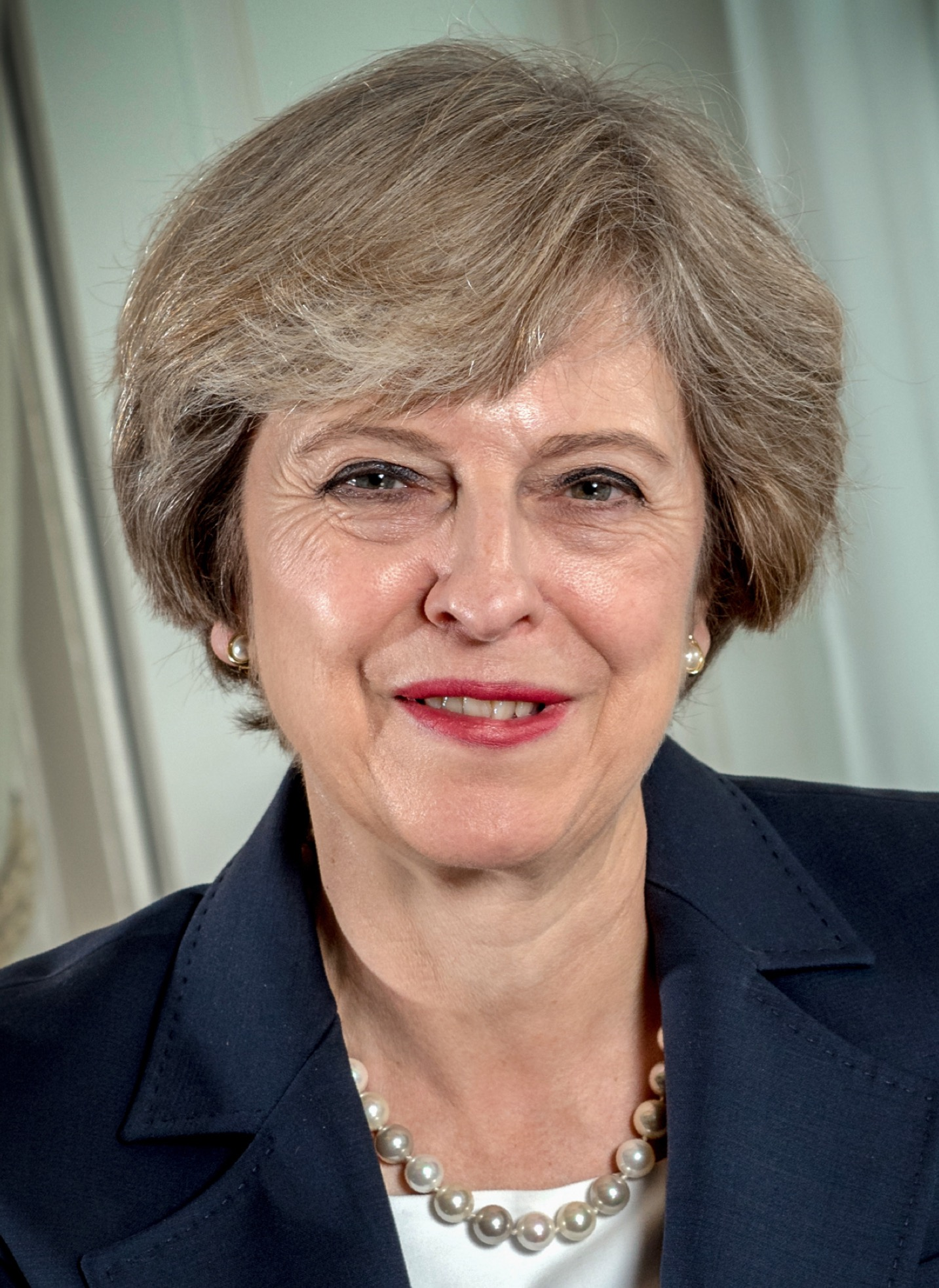

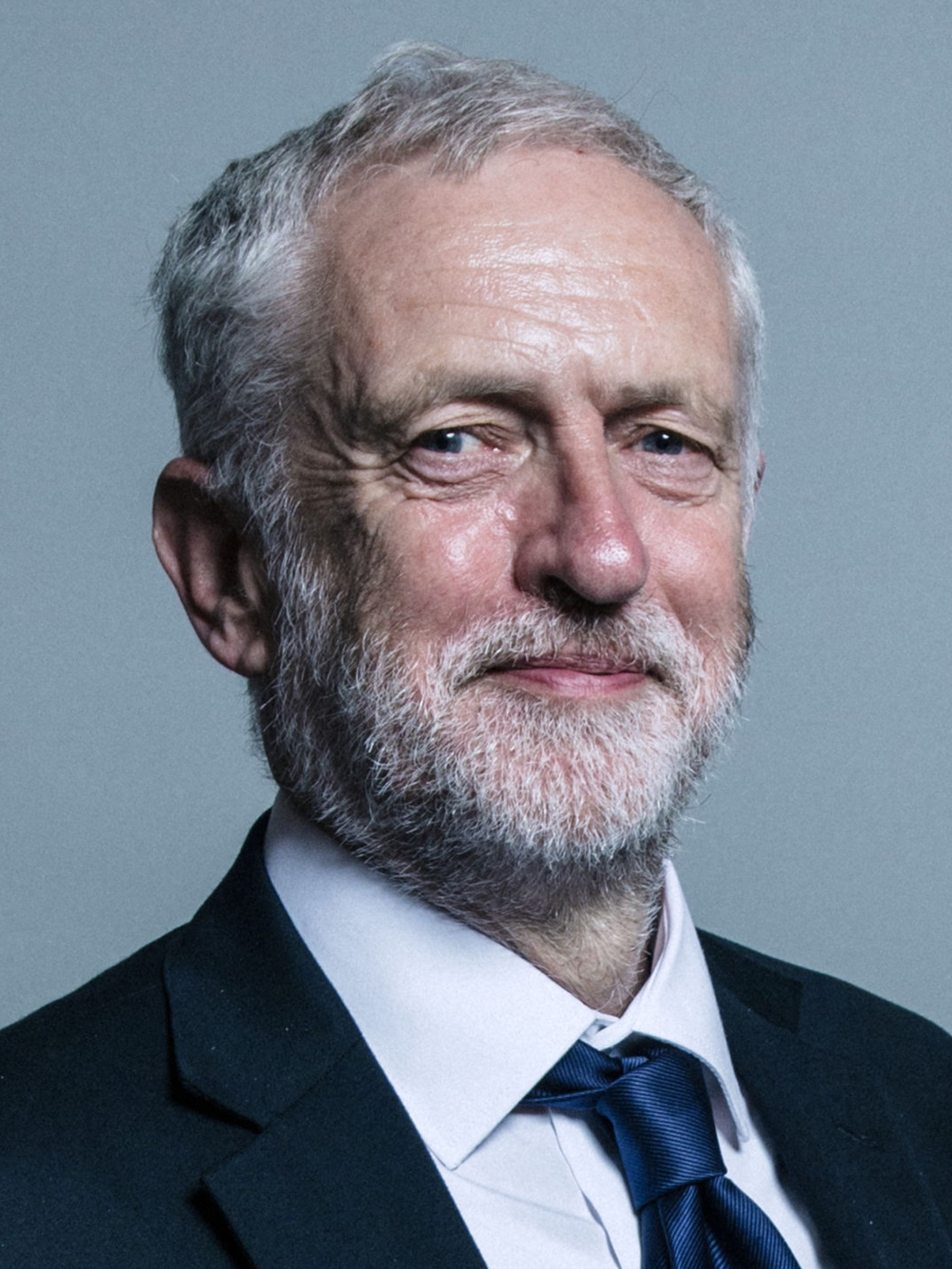

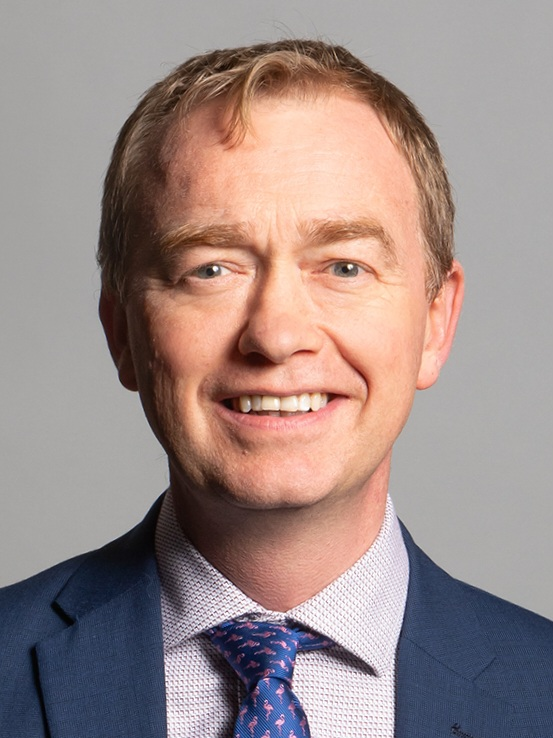

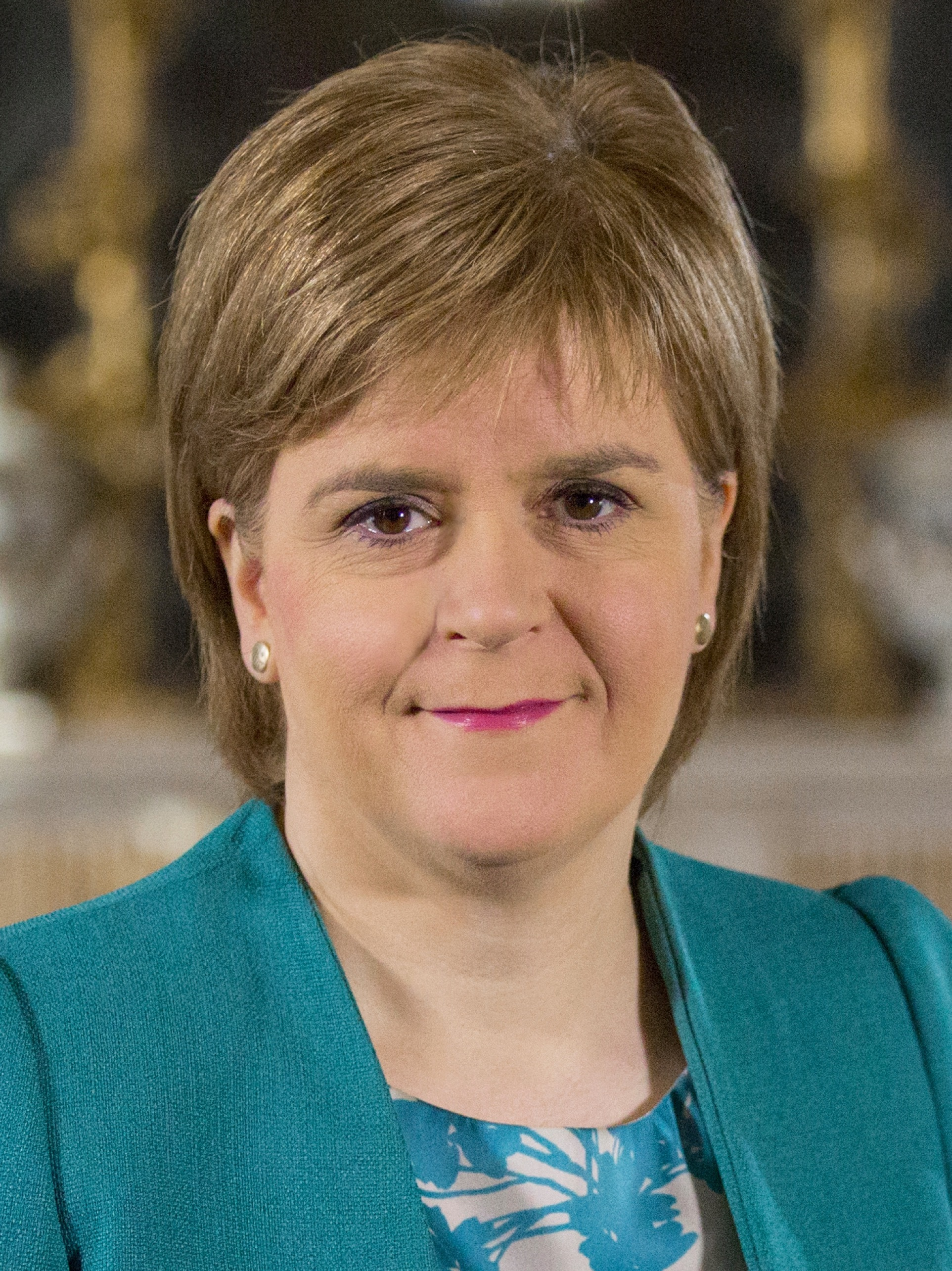

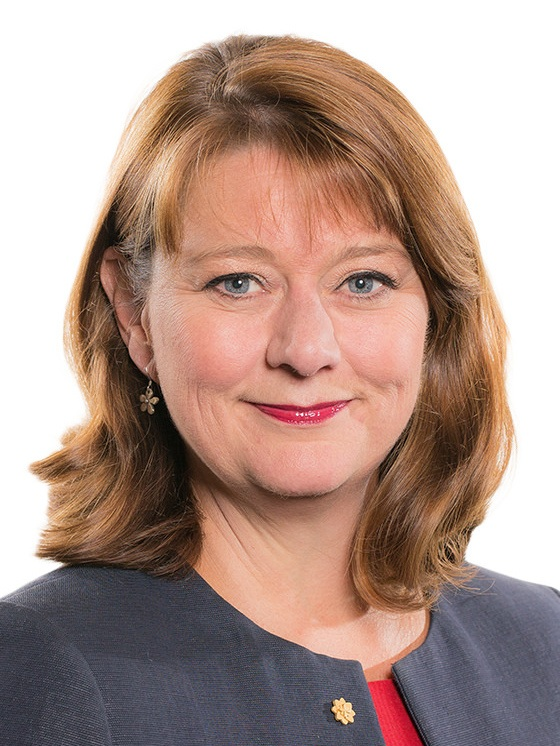
Leader	Theresa May	Jeremy Corbyn	Tim Farron
Party	Conservative	Labour	Liberal Democrats
Leader since	11 July 2016	12 September 2015	16 July 2015
Seats before	8,680 seats 189 councils	6,855 seats 113 councils	1,860 seats 8 councils
Projected vote share (Note: All vote shares in the infobox are projected national vote shares calculated by the BBC.)	38% ▲8%	27% ▼4%	18% ▲3%
Seats won (2017)	1,899; 28 councils	1,148; 9 councils	442; 0 councils
Councillors (after)	9,239; 200 councils	6,467; 106 councils	1,812; 8 councils
Net change (notional)	▲559 ▲11 councils	▼386 ▼7 councils	▼42; 0 councils
Leader	Nicola Sturgeon	Leanne Wood
Party	SNP	Plaid Cymru
Leader since	14 November 2014	16 March 2012
Seats before	416 seats 1 councils	174 seats 0 councils
Seats won (2017)	431; 0 councils	208; 1 councils
Councillors (after)	431; 0 councils	208; 1 councils
Net change (notional)	▼7 ▼1 councils	▲38 ▲1 councils
- Map showing council control (left) and largest party by ward or division (right) following the election. Conservative Labour Liberal Democrats Scottish National Party Plaid Cymru UKIP Majority of independent councillors No overall control No election on 4 May 2017

The 2017 United Kingdom local elections were held on Thursday 4 May 2017. Local elections were held across Great Britain, with elections to 35 English local authorities and all councils in Scotland and Wales.

Newly created combined authority mayors were directly elected in six areas of England: Cambridgeshire and Peterborough, Greater Manchester, the Liverpool City Region, Tees Valley, the West Midlands, and the West of England. In addition, Doncaster and North Tyneside re-elected local authority mayors. Local by-elections for 107 council seats also took place on 4 May.

The Conservative Party led under Prime Minister Theresa May enjoyed the best local election performance in a decade, making significant gains at the expense of the Labour Party. The UK Independence Party lost every seat they were defending, but gained just one seat at the expense of the Labour Party. The Liberal Democrats lost 41 seats, despite their vote share increasing. The Conservatives won four out of six metro-mayoral areas, including in the traditionally Labour-voting Tees Valley and West Midlands.

The local elections were followed by a general election on 8 June.

== Eligibility to vote ==
All registered electors (British, Irish, Commonwealth and European Union citizens) who were aged 18 or over (or aged 16 or over in Scotland) on polling day were entitled to vote in the local elections. A person who had two homes (such as a university student having a term-time address and living at home during holidays) could register to vote at both addresses as long as they were not in the same electoral area, and could vote in the local elections for the two different local councils.

Individuals had to be registered to vote by midnight twelve working days before polling day (13 April 2017 in England and Wales; 17 April 2017 in Scotland). Anyone qualifying as an anonymous elector had until midnight on 25 April 2017 to register.

== Seats held prior to the election ==
In total, 4,851 council seats were up for election in 88 councils; additionally six new mayors were directly elected. Approximately 10,000 people were candidates for election. All 32 councils in Scotland (1,227 seats) and all 22 councils in Wales (1,254 seats) were up for election; an additional 34 councils (2,370 seats) in England were up for election. Of the 35 English councils up for election, 27 were county councils, seven were unitary authorities, and one was the Doncaster Metropolitan Borough Council.

According to a BBC News estimate, taking into account boundary changes, the major political parties were effectively defending the following notional results in council seats on election day:

- Labour – 1,535 seats
- Conservatives – 1,336 seats
- Lib Dems – 484 seats
- SNP – 438 seats
- Plaid Cymru – 170 seats
- UKIP – 146 seats
- Green Party – 34 seats

There were also 687 independent councillors and 4 Mebyon Kernow councillors. The remaining 217 seats were held by residents' associations and minor parties. A by-election for the parliamentary constituency of Manchester Gorton (caused by the death of Gerald Kaufman, the sitting MP) was due to be held on the same day as the local election, but the by-election was cancelled after the general election was called for the following month.

== Results ==
Overview map of council election results Conservative hold Conservative gain from No overall control Conservative gain from Labour Labour hold Labour lose to Independent majority or No overall control Scottish National Party lose to No overall control (Dundee City) Plaid Cymru hold Majority of independent councillors, no change Majority of independent councillors lose to No overall control No overall control, no change No election on 4 May 2017

=== Overall results - Great Britain ===
Party	Councillors			Councils		
Party	Won	After	+/- (Note: Because the number of council seats shifts every year due to boundary changes and local government reorganisation, changes are notional changes calculated by the BBC.)	Won	After	+/-
Conservative	1,899	9,239	▲563	28	200	▲11
Labour	1,148	6,467	▼382	9	106	▼7
Liberal Democrats	441	1,812	▼42	0	8	Steady
SNP	431	431	▼7	0	0	▼1
UKIP	1	346	▼145	0	0	Steady
Plaid Cymru	208	208	▲38	1	1	▲1
Green	39	187	▲5	0	0	Steady
Independent	702	1,525	▼33	6	8	▲1
No overall control	—N/a			44	81	▼5

As elections were not held throughout the country, the BBC calculated a Projected National Vote Share (PNV), which aims to assess what the council results indicate the UK-wide vote would be "if the results were repeated at a general election". The BBC's preliminary Projected National Vote Share was 38% for the Conservatives, 27% for Labour, 18% for the Liberal Democrats and 5% for the UK Independence Party, with others on around 12%.

This is the highest vote share for the Conservatives in local elections since 2008, when they faced Labour a decade into government and suffering from the financial crisis. The Liberal Democrats have performed better than at any election since 2010, whilst Labour has not performed so badly since 2010. The turnout was 35.3%.

UKIP lost 145 of their 146 seats. Prominent former UKIP members talked of the party being finished and that it should disband.

=== Results by nation ===
==== England ====
Party	Votes	Vote %	+/-	Councils	+/-	Seats	+/-
Conservative	3,036,709	46.5%	▲12.2%	27	▲10	1,439	▲319
Labour	1,299,846	19.9%	▼1.6%	2	▼1	418	▼142
Liberal Democrats	1,164,779	17.8%	▲4.2%	0	Steady	312	▼28
UKIP	302,368	4.6%	▼15.6%	0	Steady	1	▼143
Green	284,735	4.4%	▲0.8%	0	Steady	20	Steady
Others	438,985	6.7%	▼0.2%	0	Steady	199	▼6
No overall control	n/a	n/a	n/a	5	▼9	n/a	n/a
Total	6,545,055	100		34		2,389	

Note that unlike in Scotland and Wales, where all local authorities were up for election, the England results are for only 34 councils out of 353, and should not be taken as reflective of the whole of England.

==== Wales ====
Party	Votes	%	+/-	Councils	+/-	Seats	+/-
Labour	294,989	30.4%	▼4.5%	7	▼3	468	▼112
Independent	218,817	22.5%	▼1.3%	3	▲1	309	▲2
Conservative	182,520	18.8%	▲6.3%	1	▲1	184	▲79
Plaid Cymru	160,519	16.5%	▲0.5%	1	▲1	208	▲38
Liberal Democrats	66,022	6.8%	▼1.2%	0	Steady	63	▼10
Green	12,441	1.3%	▲0.2%	0	Steady	1	▲1
UKIP	11,006	1.1%	▲0.3%	0	Steady	0	▼2
Others	24,594	2.5%	▼0.3%	0	Steady	21	▼7
No overall control	n/a	n/a	n/a	10	▲1	n/a	n/a
Total	970,908	100		22		1,254	

For comparative purposes, the table above shows changes since 2012 across 21 local authorities and the 2013 result from Anglesey Council.

==== Scotland ====
Following boundary changes:

Summary of the 4 May 2017 Scottish council election results
Party	First-preference votes			Councils	+/-	2012 seats		2017 seats		Seat change
Party	First-preference votes			Councils	+/-	Seats won	Notional	Seats won	Seat %	vs Notional
Scottish National Party	610,454	32.3%	0.0	0	▼1	425	438	431	35.1%	▼7
Conservative	478,073	25.3%	▲12.0%	0	Steady	115	112	276	22.5%	▲164
Labour	380,957	20.2%	▼11.4%	0	▼3	394	395	262	21.4%	▼133
Independents	196,438	10.4%	▼1.4%	3	Steady	196	198	168	14.1%	▼30
Liberal Democrats	130,243	6.9%	▲0.3%	0	Steady	71	70	67	5.5%	▼3
Green	77,682	4.1%	▲1.8%	0	Steady	14	14	19	1.6%	▲5
Orkney Manifesto Group	894	0.0%		0	Steady			2	0.1%	New
West Dunbartonshire Community	2,413	0.1%		0	Steady			1	0.1%	New
The Rubbish Party	784	0.0%		0	Steady			1	0.1%	New
UK Independence Party	2,920	0.2%	▼0.1%	0	Steady				0.0%	Steady
Independent Alliance North Lanarkshire	2,823	0.2%		0	Steady				0.0%	Steady
TUSC	1,403	0.1%		0	Steady				0.0%	Steady
A Better Britain – Unionist Party	1,196	0.1%		0	Steady				0.0%	Steady
Scottish Socialist	928	0.0%	▼0.3%	0	Steady	1		0	0.0%	▼1
Solidarity	883	0.0%		0	Steady				0.0%	Steady
Libertarian	776	0.0%		0	Steady				0.0%	Steady
RISE	186	0.0%		0	Steady				0.0%	Steady
Scottish Independent Network	145	0.0%		0	Steady				0.0%	Steady
Scottish Unionist	129	0.0%		0	Steady				0.0%	Steady
Social Democratic	112	0.0%		0	Steady				0.0%	Steady
Scottish Christian	104	0.0%		0	Steady				0.0%	Steady
Socialist Labour	76	0.0%		0	Steady				0.0%	Steady
National Front	39	0.0%		0	Steady				0.0%	Steady
No Overall Control	—	—	—	29	▲4	—	—	—	—	—
Total	1,889,658	100.0	±0.0	32	Steady	1,223	1,227	1,227	100.00	Steady

The table has been arranged according to popular vote, not the number of seats won.

There were boundary changes in many of these councils, with an increase in council seats across the country from 1,223 to 1,227, making direct comparisons with the 2012 results problematic. Notional seats and seat change are based on a notional 2012 result calculated by the BBC.

=== Maps ===
Council control (voting areas only)		Council control (whole UK)	
Before elections	After elections	Before elections	After elections
Majority of Independents No overall control No council election on 4 May 2017
Largest party by popular vote (including mayoral elections)		/ / / / / / Conservative; / / / / / / Labour; / / / / / / SNP; / / / / / / Plaid Cymru; / / / / / / Independents; 0 / 10 / 20 / 30 / 40 / %	
and its vote share	and the size of its majority	/ / / / / / Conservative; / / / / / / Labour; / / / / / / SNP; / / / / / / Plaid Cymru; / / / / / / Independents; 0 / 10 / 20 / 30 / 40 / %	
No election on 4 May 2017		/ / / / / / Conservative; / / / / / / Labour; / / / / / / SNP; / / / / / / Plaid Cymru; / / / / / / Independents; 0 / 10 / 20 / 30 / 40 / %	

== England ==
Map of previous control of councils up for election. Conservative Labour Scottish National Party Majority of independent councillors No overall control No election on 4 May 2017

=== Non-metropolitan county councils ===
All 27 county councils for areas with a two-tier structure of local governance had all of their seats up for election. These were first-past-the-post elections in a mixture of single-member and multi-member electoral divisions.

These were the last elections to Dorset and Northamptonshire county councils.

Council	Previous control	Result	Details
Buckinghamshire	Conservative	Conservative	Details
Cambridgeshire ‡	No overall control (Cons. plurality)	Conservative	Details
Cumbria	No overall control (Lab. and Lib. Dem. coalition)	No overall control (Lab. and Lib. Dem. coalition)	Details
Derbyshire	Labour	Conservative	Details
Devon ‡	Conservative	Conservative	Details
Dorset ‡	Conservative	Conservative	Details
East Sussex ‡	No overall control (Cons. plurality)	Conservative	Details
Essex	Conservative	Conservative	Details
Gloucestershire ‡	No overall control (Cons. plurality)	Conservative	Details
Hampshire ‡	Conservative	Conservative	Details
Hertfordshire ‡	Conservative	Conservative	Details
Kent ‡	Conservative	Conservative	Details
Lancashire ‡	No overall control (Lab. plurality w. Lib. Dem. support)	Conservative	Details
Leicestershire ‡	Conservative	Conservative	Details
Lincolnshire ‡	No overall control (Cons. and Lib. Dem. coalition)	Conservative	Details
Norfolk	No overall control (Cons. plurality)†	Conservative	Details
North Yorkshire	Conservative	Conservative	Details
Northamptonshire	Conservative	Conservative	Details
Nottinghamshire ‡	Labour	No overall control (Cons. and independent coalition)	Details
Oxfordshire ‡	No overall control (Cons. plurality)	No overall control (Cons. and independent coalition)	Details
Somerset	Conservative	Conservative	Details
Staffordshire	Conservative	Conservative	Details
Suffolk	No overall control (Cons. plurality)	Conservative	Details
Surrey	Conservative	Conservative	Details
Warwickshire ‡	No overall control (Cons. plurality)	Conservative	Details
West Sussex ‡	Conservative	Conservative	Details
Worcestershire	Conservative	Conservative	Details

‡ New electoral division boundaries
† The Conservatives lost control in 2013, and were replaced by a Labour/UKIP/Lib Dem coalition with Independent/Green support. The Conservatives regained the council leadership in May 2016 after the Green Party abstained in the annual Council leadership election, and by-elections and defections later brought the Conservative total to 42 seats, giving them exactly 50% of the seats.

=== Unitary authorities ===
Six single-tier unitary authorities held elections, with all of their seats up for election. These were first-past-the-post elections in a mixture of single-member and multi-member electoral divisions or wards.

Council	Council seats up for election	Previous control	Result	Details
Cornwall	All	No overall control (Lib. Dem. and independents coalition)	No overall control (Lib. Dem. and independents coalition)	Details
Durham	All	Labour	Labour	Details
Isle of Wight	All	No overall control (Cons. plurality)	Conservative	Details
Northumberland	All	No overall control (Lab. plurality)	No overall control (Cons. plurality)	Details
Shropshire	All	Conservative	Conservative	Details
Wiltshire	All	Conservative	Conservative	Details

=== Metropolitan boroughs ===
One metropolitan borough, the Metropolitan Borough of Doncaster, had all of its seats up for election, after moving to whole council elections in 2015. This was a first-past-the-post election in a mixture of two-member and three-member wards.

Council	Previous control	Result	Details
Doncaster	Labour	Labour	Details

=== Isles of Scilly ===
The Council of the Isles of Scilly was created by the Local Government Act 1888, meaning they lie outside the classifications of authorities used in the rest of England.

Council	Proportion up for election	Previous control	Result	Details
Isles of Scilly	All	Independent	Independent hold	Details

=== Mayoral elections ===
Map of the regional combined authority mayoralties up for election in 2017.

==== Combined authority mayors ====
Six elections were held for directly elected regional mayors. These newly established positions lead combined authorities set up by groups of local councils, as part of devolution deals giving the combined authorities additional powers and funding.

Combined authority	Interim mayor/chair	Result	Details
Cambridgeshire and Peterborough	Robin Howe (Con)	James Palmer (Con)	Details
Greater Manchester	Tony Lloyd (Lab)	Andy Burnham (Labour Co-op)	Details
Liverpool City Region	Joe Anderson (Lab)	Steve Rotheram (Lab)	Details
Tees Valley	Sue Jeffrey (Lab)	Ben Houchen (Con)	Details
West of England	Matthew Riddle (Con)	Tim Bowles (Con)	Details
West Midlands	Bob Sleigh (Con)	Andy Street (Con)	Details

Other planned mayoralties have been postponed or cancelled. The election of the Sheffield City Region Combined Authority mayor was postponed in January 2017 and, following legal action, did not occur until the 2018 local elections. The North East Combined Authority deal was scrapped as several councils in the region voted down the proposal, however the smaller North of Tyne combined authority was approved by the councils and by parliament for the 2019 local elections. The other devolution deals that were scrapped were for the Norfolk and Suffolk, Greater Lincolnshire and the Solent.

There were concerns at the low turnout recorded.

==== Local authority mayors ====
Two elections for directly elected local district mayors were held. These Mayors act as council leaders in their local authorities.

Local Authority	Incumbent mayor	Result	Details
Doncaster	Ros Jones (Lab)	Ros Jones (Lab)	Details
North Tyneside	Norma Redfearn (Lab)	Norma Redfearn (Lab)	Details

== Scotland ==
Map of the Scottish results.

Council	Previous control	Result	Details
Aberdeen City	No overall control	No overall control	Details
Aberdeenshire	SNP	No overall control	Details
Angus	No overall control	No overall control	Details
Argyll and Bute	No overall control	No overall control	Details
Clackmannanshire	No overall control	No overall control	Details
Dumfries and Galloway	No overall control	No overall control	Details
Dundee City	SNP	No overall control	Details
East Ayrshire	No overall control	No overall control	Details
East Dunbartonshire	No overall control	No overall control	Details
East Lothian	No overall control	No overall control	Details
East Renfrewshire	No overall control	No overall control	Details
City of Edinburgh	No overall control	No overall control	Details
Falkirk	No overall control	No overall control	Details
Fife	No overall control	No overall control	Details
Glasgow City	Labour	No overall control	Details
Highland	No overall control	No overall control	Details
Inverclyde	No overall control	No overall control	Details
Midlothian	No overall control	No overall control	Details
Moray	No overall control	No overall control	Details
Na h-Eileanan Siar	Independent	Independent	Details
North Ayrshire	No overall control	No overall control	Details
North Lanarkshire	No overall control	No overall control	Details
Orkney	Independent	Independent	Details
Perth and Kinross	No overall control	No overall control	Details
Renfrewshire	Labour	No overall control	Details
Scottish Borders	No overall control	No overall control	Details
Shetland	Independent	Independent	Details
South Ayrshire	No overall control	No overall control	Details
South Lanarkshire	Labour	No overall control	Details
Stirling	No overall control	No overall control	Details
West Dunbartonshire	Labour	No overall control	Details
West Lothian	No overall control	No overall control	Details

== Wales ==
Map of the Welsh results.

Council	Previous control	Result	Details
Isle of Anglesey	No overall control	No overall control	Details
Blaenau Gwent	Labour	Independent	Details
Bridgend	Labour	No overall control	Details
Caerphilly	Labour	Labour	Details
Cardiff	Labour	Labour	Details
Carmarthenshire	No overall control	No overall control	Details
Ceredigion	No overall control	No overall control	Details
Conwy	No overall control (PC, Lab., Lib. Dem., and independents coalition) †	No overall control	Details
Denbighshire	No overall control (PC, independents, and Cons. coalition) ‡	No overall control	Details
Flintshire	No overall control	No overall control	Details
Gwynedd	Plaid Cymru††	Plaid Cymru	Details
Merthyr Tydfil	Labour	Independent	Details
Monmouthshire	No overall control	Conservative	Details
Neath Port Talbot	Labour	Labour	Details
Newport	Labour	Labour	Details
Pembrokeshire	Independent	Independent	Details
Powys	Independent	No overall control	Details
Rhondda Cynon Taff	Labour	Labour	Details
Swansea	Labour	Labour	Details
Torfaen	Labour	Labour	Details
Vale of Glamorgan	No overall control	No overall control	Details
Wrexham	No overall control	No overall control	Details

† In 2014, the only Welsh Liberal Democrat cabinet member defected to Welsh Labour; thus the Liberal Democrats left the coalition.
In 2015, several Independent councillors created their own group within the council called Conwy First. This group later on went to support the council instead of the remaining five independent councillors, so that the coalition was then made up of Plaid Cymru, Welsh Labour and Conwy First.
‡ The Welsh Liberal Democrats later lost their only seat on the Council, thereby leaving the coalition.
†† At the original election Plaid Cymru won exactly half the seats; they later took control of the council by winning a by-election.

== See also ==
- 2017 City of London Corporation election
