= Leadership approval opinion polling for the 2017 United Kingdom general election =

At various dates in the run up to the 2017 general election, various organisations carried out opinion polling to gauge the opinions that voters hold towards political leaders. Results of such polls are displayed in this article. Most of the polling companies listed are members of the British Polling Council (BPC) and abide by its disclosure rules.

The date range for these opinion polls is from the previous general election, held on 6 May 2015, to the 8 June 2017.

== Leadership approval ratings ==
- YouGov: "Do you view (Insert name here) favourably or unfavourably?"
- Ipsos MORI: "Are you satisfied or dissatisfied with the way (Insert name here) is doing his job as Prime Minister/Party leader?"

=== Theresa May ===
The following polls asked about voters' opinions on Theresa May, Leader of the Conservatives and Prime Minister of the United Kingdom.

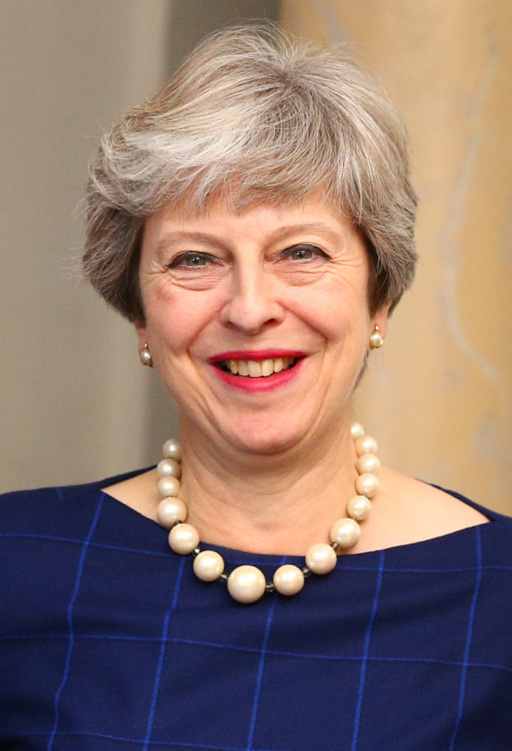
Theresa May, Prime Minister and leader of the Conservative Party.

==== 2017 ====
Date(s) conducted	Polling organisation/client	Question wording	Approve	Disapprove	Don't know	Neither	Net approval
1-2 Jun	YouGov	Well/Badly	42%	47%	11%	—	-5%
30 May-1 Jun	Ipsos MORI	Satisfied/Dissatisfied	43%	50%	7%	—	-7%
15-17 May	Ipsos MORI	Satisfied/Dissatisfied	55%	35%	10%	—	+20%
4 May	United Kingdom local and mayoral elections						
21-25 Apr	Ipsos MORI	Satisfied/Dissatisfied	56%	37%	7%	—	+19%
2 May	Opinium	Approve/Disapprove	46%	33%	21%	—	+13%
18 Apr	Prime Minister Theresa May announces her intention to seek a general election to be held on 8 June 2017						
10-14 Mar	Ipsos MORI	Satisfied/Dissatisfied	52%	39%	9%	—	+13%
10-14 Feb	Ipsos MORI	Satisfied/Dissatisfied	53%	36%	11%	—	+17%
13-16 Jan	Ipsos MORI	Satisfied/Dissatisfied	45%	39%	16%	—	+6%

==== 2016 ====
Date(s) conducted	Polling organisation/client	Question wording	Approve	Disapprove	Don't know	Neither	Net approval
10-12 Dec	Ipsos MORI	Satisfied/Dissatisfied	50%	35%	15%	—	+15%
11-14 Nov	Ipsos MORI	Satisfied/Dissatisfied	54%	30%	16%	—	+14%
14-17 Oct	Ipsos MORI	Satisfied/Dissatisfied	48%	32%	20%	—	+16%
10-14 Sep	Ipsos MORI	Satisfied/Dissatisfied	54%	27%	19%	—	+27%
15-17 Aug	YouGov	Favourable/Unfavourable	48%	36%	—	16%	+12%
13-15 Aug	Ipsos MORI	Satisfied/Dissatisfied	54%	19%	27%	—	+35%

=== Jeremy Corbyn ===
The following polls asked about voters' opinions on Jeremy Corbyn, Leader of the Labour Party.

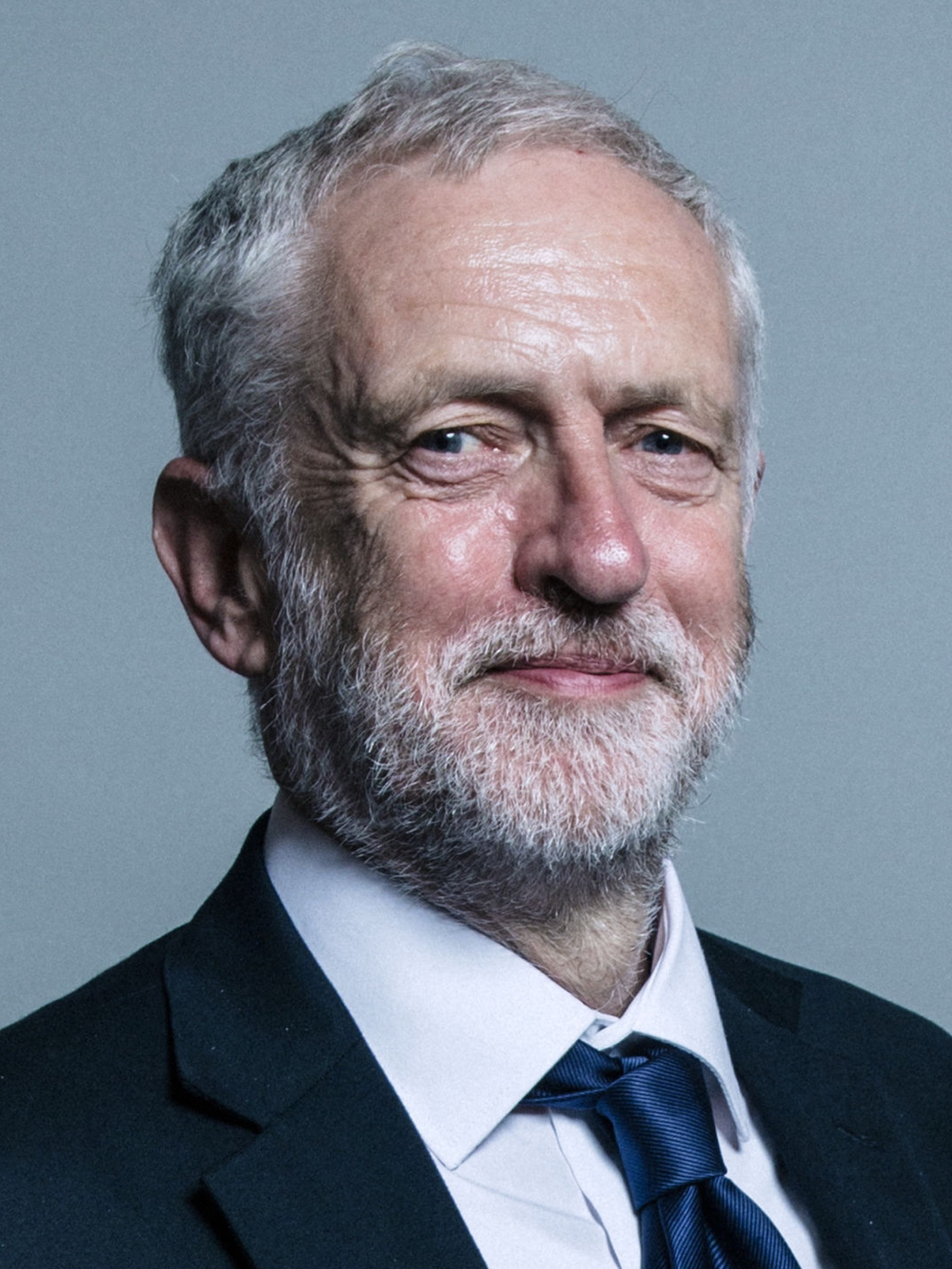
Jeremy Corbyn, Leader of the Labour Party.

==== 2017 ====
Date(s) conducted	Polling organisation/client	Question wording	Approve	Disapprove	Don't know	Neither	Net approval
1-2 Jun	YouGov	Well/Badly	42%	44%	11%	—	-2%
20 May-1 Jun	Ipsos MORI	Satisfied/Dissatisfied	39%	50%	11%	—	-11%
15-17 May	Ipsos MORI	Satisfied/Dissatisfied	31%	58%	11%	—	-27%
4 May	United Kingdom local and mayoral elections						
21-25 Apr	Ipsos MORI	Satisfied/Dissatisfied	27%	62%	11%	—	-35%
18 Apr	Prime Minister Theresa May announces her intention to seek a general election to be held on 8 June 2017						
10-14 Mar	Ipsos MORI	Satisfied/Dissatisfied	23%	64%	13%	—	-41%
10-14 Feb	Ipsos MORI	Satisfied/Dissatisfied	24%	62%	14%	—	-42%
13-16 Jan	Ipsos MORI	Satisfied/Dissatisfied	26%	61%	13%	—	-35%

==== 2016 ====
Date(s) conducted	Polling organisation/client	Question wording	Approve	Disapprove	Don't know	Neither	Net approval
10-12 Dec	Ipsos MORI	Satisfied/Dissatisfied	26%	58%	16%	—	-32%
11-14 Nov	Ipsos MORI	Satisfied/Dissatisfied	28%	57%	15%	—	-29%
14-17 Oct	Ipsos MORI	Satisfied/Dissatisfied	31%	55%	14%	—	-24%
24 Sep	Jeremy Corbyn is re-elected as the Leader of the Labour Party and Leader of the Opposition following a vote of no confidence.						
10-14 Sep	Ipsos MORI	Satisfied/Dissatisfied	27%	58%	15%	—	-31%
15-17 Aug	YouGov	Favourable/Unfavourable	29%	54%	—	17%	-25%
13-15 Aug	Ipsos MORI	Satisfied/Dissatisfied	25%	58%	17%	—	-33%
9-11 Jul	Ipsos MORI	Satisfied/Dissatisfied	24%	65%	11%	—	-41%
23 Jun	UK European Union membership referendum: 52% of voters vote in favour of leaving EU; David Cameron announces he will resign as Prime Minister						
11-14 Jun	Ipsos MORI	Satisfied/Dissatisfied	27%	52%	21%	—	-25%
14-16 May	Ipsos MORI	Satisfied/Dissatisfied	31%	50%	19%	—	-19%
5 May	United Kingdom local elections, 2016						
16-18 Apr	Ipsos MORI	Satisfied/Dissatisfied	38%	43%	19%	—	-5%
19-22 Mar	Ipsos MORI	Satisfied/Dissatisfied	35%	46%	19%	—	-11%
13-16 Feb	Ipsos MORI	Satisfied/Dissatisfied	30%	51%	19%	—	-21%
23-25 Jan	Ipsos MORI	Satisfied/Dissatisfied	31%	49%	20%	—	-17%

==== 2015 ====
Date(s) conducted	Polling organisation/client	Question wording	Approve	Disapprove	Don't know	Neither	Net approval
12-14 Dec	Ipsos MORI	Satisfied/Dissatisfied	33%	50%	17%	—	-17%
14-17 Nov	Ipsos MORI	Satisfied/Dissatisfied	37%	40%	13%	—	-3%
17-19 Oct	Ipsos MORI	Satisfied/Dissatisfied	37%	39%	24%	—	-2%
19-22 Sep	Ipsos MORI	Satisfied/Dissatisfied	33%	36%	31%	—	-3%

=== Tim Farron ===
The following polls asked about voters' opinions on Tim Farron, Leader of the Liberal Democrats.

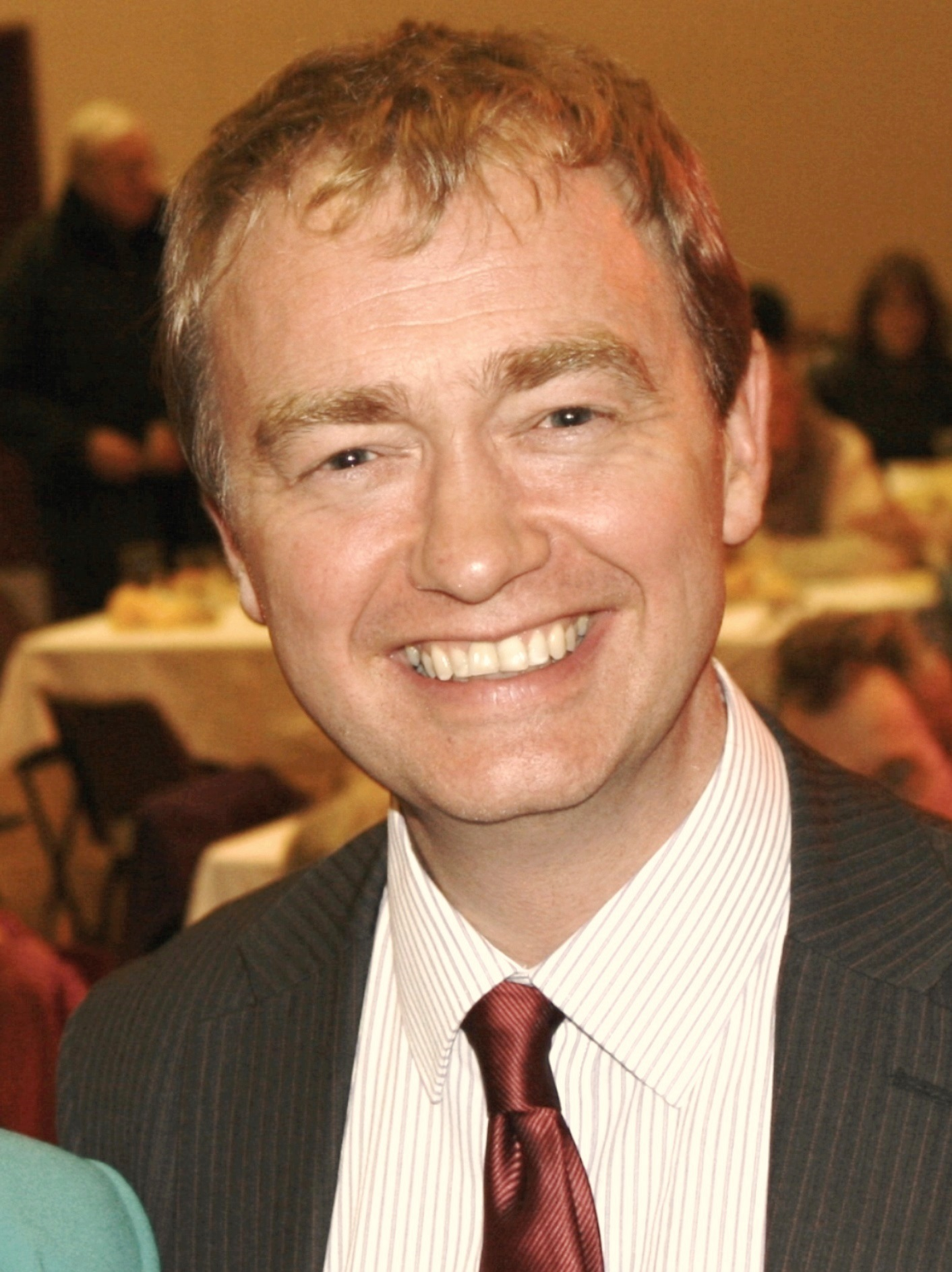
Tim Farron, Leader of the Liberal Democrats.

==== 2017 ====
Date(s) conducted	Polling organisation/client	Question wording	Approve	Disapprove	Don't know	Neither	Net approval
20 May-1 Jun	Ipsos MORI	Satisfied/Dissatisfied	25%	44%	31%	—	-19%
15-17 May	Ipsos MORI	Satisfied/Dissatisfied	28%	39%	33%	—	-11%
4 May	United Kingdom local and mayoral elections						
21-25 Apr	Ipsos MORI	Satisfied/Dissatisfied	30%	37%	33%	—	-7%
18 Apr	Prime Minister Theresa May announces her intention to seek a general election to be held on 8 June 2017						
10-14 Mar	Ipsos MORI	Satisfied/Dissatisfied	26%	36%	38%	—	-10%
13-16 Jan	Ipsos MORI	Satisfied/Dissatisfied	23%	33%	44%	—	-10%

==== 2016 ====
Date(s) conducted	Polling organisation/client	Question wording	Approve	Disapprove	Don't know	Neither	Net approval
10-12 Dec	Ipsos MORI	Satisfied/Dissatisfied	27%	28%	45%	—	-1%
11-14 Nov	Ipsos MORI	Satisfied/Dissatisfied	23%	36%	41%	—	-13%
14-17 Oct	Ipsos MORI	Satisfied/Dissatisfied	22%	34%	44%	—	-12%
10-14 Sep	Ipsos MORI	Satisfied/Dissatisfied	22%	33%	45%	—	-11%
15-17 Aug	YouGov	Favourable/Unfavourable	17%	33%	—	50%	-16%
13-15 Aug	Ipsos MORI	Satisfied/Dissatisfied	22%	30%	48%	—	-8%
9-11 Jul	Ipsos MORI	Satisfied/Dissatisfied	21%	37%	42%	—	-16%
23 Jun	UK European Union membership referendum: 52% of voters vote in favour of leaving EU.						
11-14 Jun	Ipsos MORI	Satisfied/Dissatisfied	19%	32%	49%	—	-13%
14-16 May	Ipsos MORI	Satisfied/Dissatisfied	22%	33%	45%	—	-11%
5 May	United Kingdom local elections, 2016						
16-18 Apr	Ipsos MORI	Satisfied/Dissatisfied	21%	29%	50%	—	-8%
19-22 Mar	Ipsos MORI	Satisfied/Dissatisfied	24%	36%	40%	—	-12%
13-16 Feb	Ipsos MORI	Satisfied/Dissatisfied	20%	34%	46%	—	-14%
23-25 Jan	Ipsos MORI	Satisfied/Dissatisfied	22%	32%	46%	—	-10%

==== 2015 ====
Date(s) conducted	Polling organisation/client	Question wording	Approve	Disapprove	Don't know	Neither	Net approval
12-14 Dec	Ipsos MORI	Satisfied/Dissatisfied	24%	31%	45%	—	-7%
14-17 Nov	Ipsos MORI	Satisfied/Dissatisfied	18%	32%	50%	—	-14%
17-19 Oct	Ipsos MORI	Satisfied/Dissatisfied	22%	27%	51%	—	-5%
14-17 Nov	Ipsos MORI	Satisfied/Dissatisfied	18%	32%	50%	—	-14%
19-22 Sep	Ipsos MORI	Satisfied/Dissatisfied	22%	29%	49%	—	-7%

=== Paul Nuttall ===
The following polls asked about voters' opinions on Paul Nuttall, Leader of the UK Independence Party.

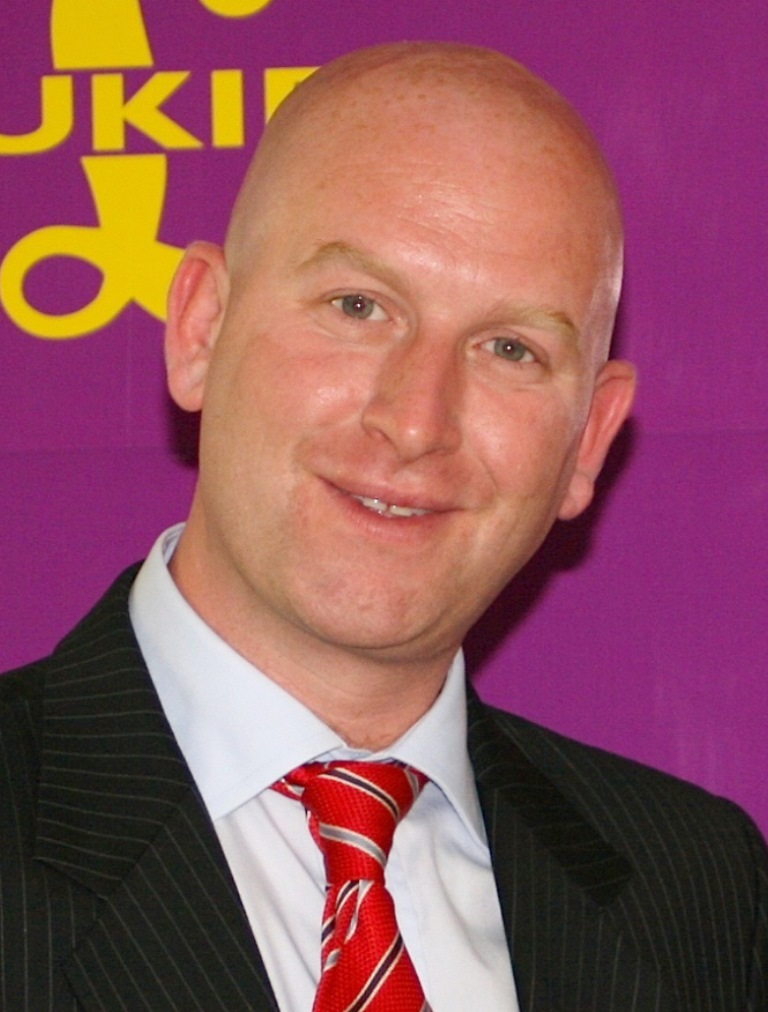
Paul Nuttall, Leader of UKIP.

==== 2017 ====
Date(s) conducted	Polling organisation/client	Question wording	Approve	Disapprove	Don't know	Neither	Net approval
20 May-1 Jun	Ipsos MORI	Satisfied/Dissatisfied	18%	55%	27%	—	-37%
15-17 May	Ipsos MORI	Satisfied/Dissatisfied	17%	54%	29%	—	
4 May	United Kingdom local and mayoral elections						
21-25 Apr	Ipsos MORI	Satisfied/Dissatisfied	21%	50%	29%	—	-29%
18 Apr	Prime Minister Theresa May announces her intention to seek a general election to be held on 8 June 2017						
10-14 Mar	Ipsos MORI	Satisfied/Dissatisfied	14%	51%	35%	—	-37%
13-16 Jan	Ipsos MORI	Satisfied/Dissatisfied	18%	36%	46%	—	-18%

==== 2016 ====
Date(s) conducted	Polling organisation/client	Question wording	Approve	Disapprove	Don't know	Neither	Net approval
10-12 Dec	Ipsos MORI	Satisfied/Dissatisfied	18%	35%	47%	—	-17%

== Approval ratings for former party leaders ==
=== David Cameron ===
The following polls asked about voters' opinions on Theresa May, Leader of the Conservatives and Prime Minister of the United Kingdom.

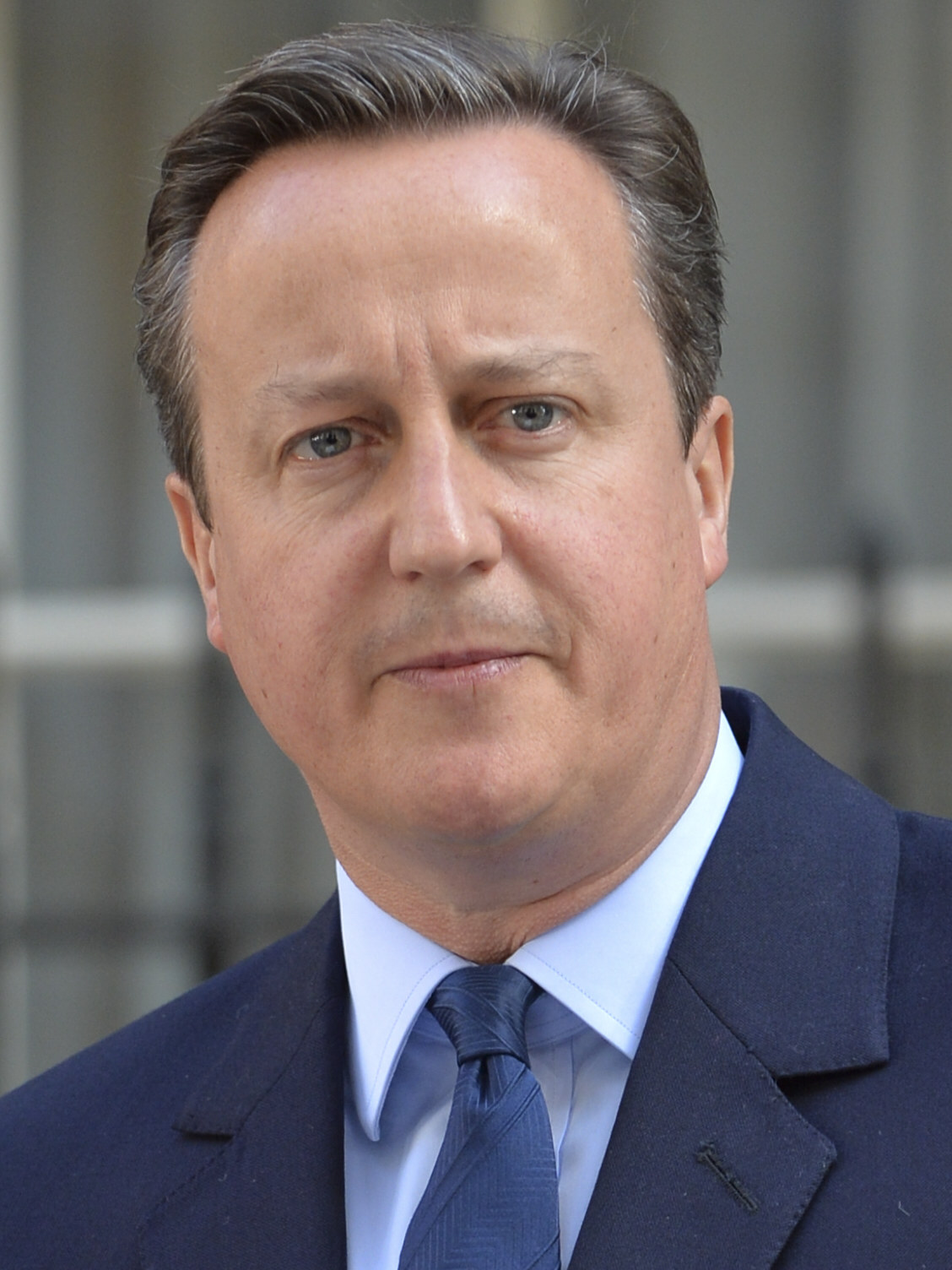
David Cameron, Prime Minister and leader of the Conservative party.

==== 2016 ====
Date(s) conducted	Polling organisation/client	Question wording	Approve	Disapprove	Don't know	Neither	Net approval
9-11 Jul	Ipsos MORI	Satisfied/Dissatisfied	28%	66%	6%	—	-38%
23 Jun	UK European Union membership referendum: 52% of voters vote in favour of leaving EU; David Cameron announces he will resign as Prime Minister						
11-14 Jun	Ipsos MORI	Satisfied/Dissatisfied	35%	58%	7%	—	-23%
14-16 May	Ipsos MORI	Satisfied/Dissatisfied	31%	61%	8%	—	-30%
5 May	United Kingdom local elections, 2016						
16-18 Apr	Ipsos MORI	Satisfied/Dissatisfied	37%	56%	7%	—	-19%
19-22 Mar	Ipsos MORI	Satisfied/Dissatisfied	34%	59%	7%	—	-25%
13-16 Feb	Ipsos MORI	Satisfied/Dissatisfied	39%	54%	7%	—	-15%
23-25 Jan	Ipsos MORI	Satisfied/Dissatisfied	42%	51%	7%	—	-9%

==== 2015 ====
Date(s) conducted	Polling organisation/client	Question wording	Approve	Disapprove	Don't know	Neither	Net approval
12-14 Dec	Ipsos MORI	Satisfied/Dissatisfied	41%	55%	4%	—	-14%
14-17 Nov	Ipsos MORI	Satisfied/Dissatisfied	40%	55%	5%	—	-15%
17-19 Oct	Ipsos MORI	Satisfied/Dissatisfied	42%	51%	7%	—	-9%
19-22 Sep	Ipsos MORI	Satisfied/Dissatisfied	42%	52%	6%	—	-10%
18-20 Jul	Ipsos MORI	Satisfied/Dissatisfied	42%	49%	9%	—	-7%
14-16 Jun	Ipsos MORI	Satisfied/Dissatisfied	49%	42%	9%	—	+7%

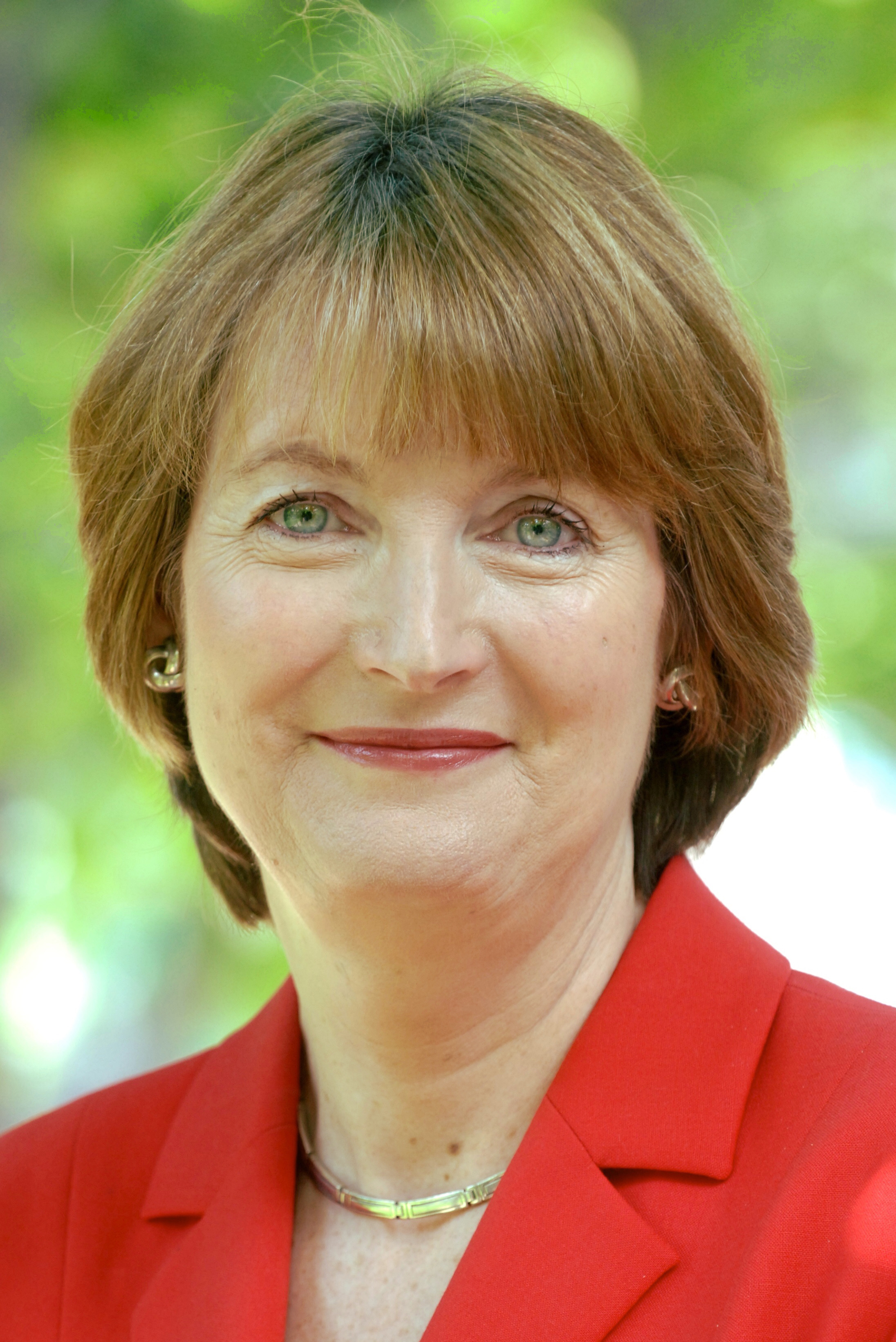
Harriet Harman, interim leader of the Labour party.

=== Harriet Harman ===
The following polls asked about voters' opinions on Harriet Harman, interim leader of the Labour Party.

==== 2015 ====
Date(s) conducted	Polling organisation/client	Question wording	Approve	Disapprove	Don't know	Neither	Net approval
18-20 Jul	Ipsos MORI	Satisfied/Dissatisfied	33%	34%	33%	—	-1%

=== Nigel Farage ===
The following polls asked about voters' opinions on Nigel Farage, Leader of the UK Independence Party.

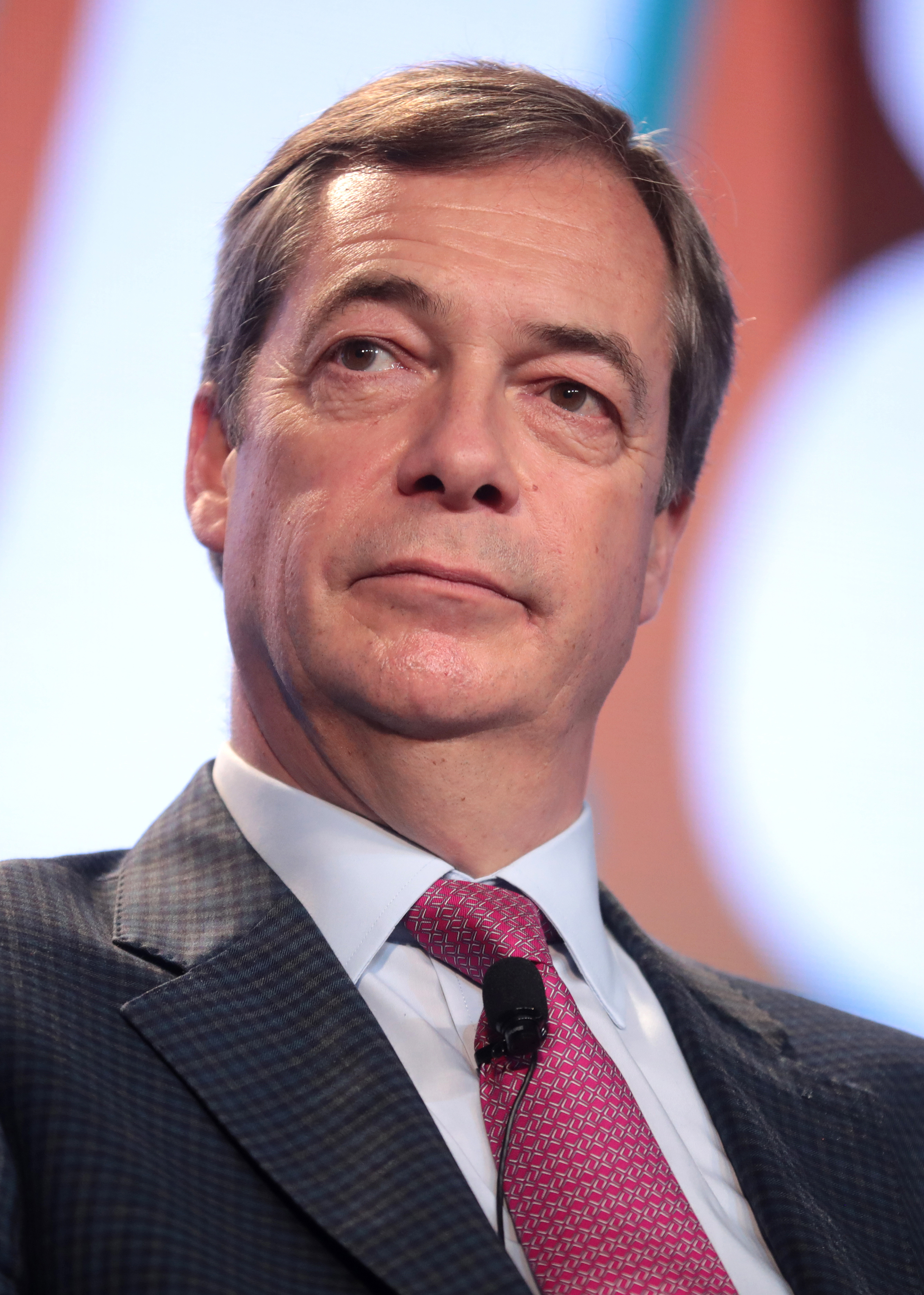
Nigel Farage, leader of the UK Independence Party.

==== 2016 ====
Date(s) conducted	Polling organisation/client	Question wording	Approve	Disapprove	Don't know	Neither	Net approval
23 Jun	UK European Union membership referendum: 52% of voters vote in favour of leaving EU; Nigel Farage announces he will resign as leader of UKIP						
11-14 Jun	Ipsos MORI	Satisfied/Dissatisfied	38%	44%	8%	—	-6%
14-16 May	Ipsos MORI	Satisfied/Dissatisfied	36%	41%	13%	—	-5%
5 May	United Kingdom local elections, 2016						
16-18 Apr	Ipsos MORI	Satisfied/Dissatisfied	32%	38%	20%	—	-6%
19-22 Mar	Ipsos MORI	Satisfied/Dissatisfied	38%	40%	12%	—	-2%
13-16 Feb	Ipsos MORI	Satisfied/Dissatisfied	33%	48%	19%	—	-15%
23-25 Jan	Ipsos MORI	Satisfied/Dissatisfied	31%	49%	20%	—	-18%

==== 2015 ====
Date(s) conducted	Polling organisation/client	Question wording	Approve	Disapprove	Don't know	Neither	Net approval
12-14 Dec	Ipsos MORI	Satisfied/Dissatisfied	33%	48%	12%	—	-18%
14-17 Nov	Ipsos MORI	Satisfied/Dissatisfied	33%	45%	12%	—	-12%
17-19 Oct	Ipsos MORI	Satisfied/Dissatisfied	46%	37%	7%	—	+9%
19-22 Sep	Ipsos MORI	Satisfied/Dissatisfied	40%	45%	15%	—	-5%
18-20 Jul	Ipsos MORI	Satisfied/Dissatisfied	31%	44%	25%	—	-13%
14-16 Jun	Ipsos MORI	Satisfied/Dissatisfied	29%	47%	24%	—	-18%

== See also ==
- Opinion polling for the 2017 United Kingdom general election
- 2017 United Kingdom general election
