= Lligwy =

Electoral ward in Anglesey, Wales

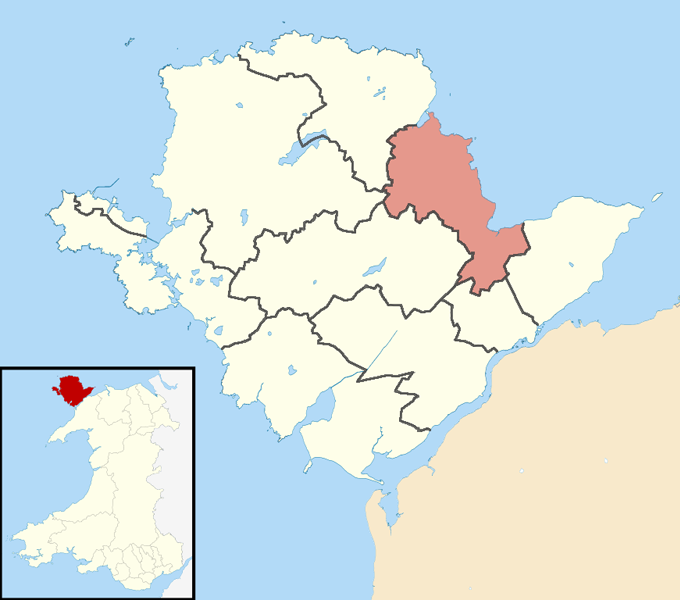
Lligwy ward location on Anglesey

Lligwy is an electoral ward on the northeast coast of Anglesey, Wales. It includes the communities Moelfre, Llaneugrad, Llanfair-Mathafarn-Eithaf (including the village of Benllech) and Pentraeth; and the electoral ward of Llanfihangel Tre'r Beirdd in the community of Llanddyfnan. Lligwy elects three county councillors to the Isle of Anglesey County Council.

Lligwy was created following the Isle of Anglesey electoral boundary changes in 2012, which created 11 multi-councillor wards from 40 single-councillor wards. Prior to this Lligwy was covered by the Moelfre ward and parts of the Brynteg, Llanbedrgoch, Llanddyfnan and Pentraeth county wards which each elected their own county councillor.

Since the May 2017 county elections, the ward has been represented by Plaid Cymru councillor Vaughan Hughes and two Independent councillors, Ieuan Williams and Margaret Murley Roberts.
