= Bro Aberffraw =

Electoral ward in Anglesey, Wales

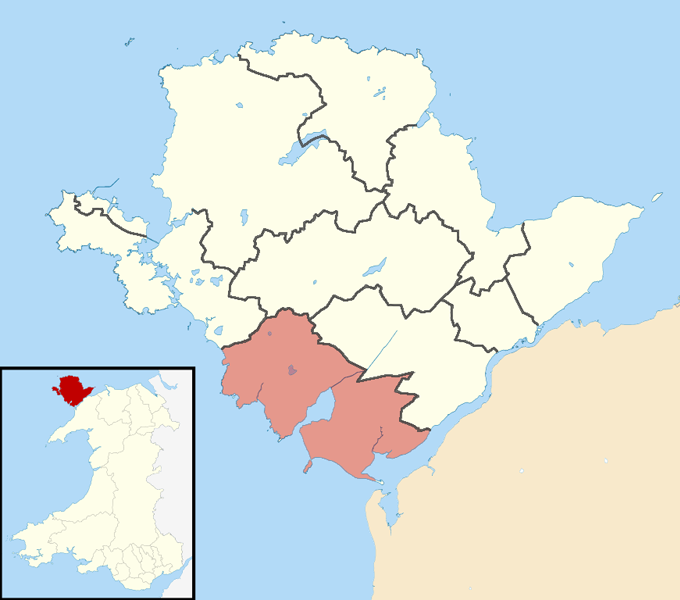
Bro Aberffraw ward location on Anglesey

Bro Aberffraw is an electoral ward in the southern corner of Anglesey, Wales. It comprises the three communities of Aberffraw, Bodorgan and Rhosyr (Newborough and Dwyran). Canolbarth Môn elects two county councillors to the Isle of Anglesey County Council.

Bro Aberffraw was one of the eleven multi-councillor wards created following the Isle of Anglesey electoral boundary changes in 2012. Prior to this the Bro Aberffraw area was covered by a separate Rhosyr ward and the majority of an Aberffraw ward and Bodorgan county ward which each elected their own county councillor.

At the May 2017 county elections, former county council leader Bryan Owen (who lost his seat for Canolbarth Môn in 2013) became a Bro Aberffraw councillor, standing as an independent. Another Independent, Peter Rogers, won the second seat. The third placed Plaid Cymru candidate lost by only six votes. He had demanded a recount, but this was refused by the returning officer.
