= Isle of Anglesey electoral boundary changes 2012 =

The Isle of Anglesey electoral boundary changes in 2012 reduced the numbers of electoral wards to the Isle of Anglesey County Council from 40 to 11. This led to the postponement of local government elections in the county by 12 months. The changes were confirmed by the Isle of Anglesey (Electoral Arrangements) Order 2012 in October 2012.

The changes were based on proposals by the Local Government Boundary Commission for Wales, after a review was ordered by the Welsh Government's Minister for Social Justice and Local Government, Carl Sargeant, in March 2012. The Commission proposed replacing the 40 electoral wards, which had elected one county councillor each, with eleven multi-member wards electing 30 county councillors in total. This was ostensibly to bring the ratio of councillors closer to 1:1750 of the voting population. The proposals were revealed by the Boundary Commission in May 2012. Despite strongly opposing the changes, Anglesey County Council voted by a majority on 27 June to accept the proposals and, in September, the Wales Government agreed to enshrine them in law.

As a result of the changes, Sargeant announced in January 2012 that the county council election which was due to take place in May 2012 (at the same time as other United Kingdom local government votes) would not take place until May 2013.

The newly created electoral divisions were:

1. Aethwy (3 councillors), covering the communities of Llanfair Pwllgwyngyll, Menai Bridge and Penmynydd
2. Bro Aberffraw (2 councillors), covering the communities of Aberffraw, Bodorgan and Rhosyr
3. Bro Rhosyr (2 councillors), covering the Communities of Llanidan, Llanfihangel Ysgeifiog, Llanddaniel Fab and Llangristiolus
4. Caergybi (3 councillors), the Holyhead community wards of Town, London Road, Morawelon, Porthyfelin, and Parc a'r Mynydd
5. Canolbarth Môn (English:Central Anglesey) (3 councillors), the communities of Bryngwran, Bodffordd, Llangefni, Trewalchmai plus the Llanddyfnan community wards of Llanddyfnan, Llangwyllog and Tregaean.
6. Llifôn (2 councillors), the communities of Llanfaelog, Llanfair-yn-Neubwll and Valley
7. Lligwy (3 councillors), the communities of Moelfre, Llaneugrad, Llanfair-Mathafarn-Eithaf, Pentraeth plus the Llanddyfnan community ward of Llanfihangel Tre'r Beirdd.
8. Seiriol (3 councillors), the communities of Beaumaris, Cwm Cadnant, Llanddona and Llangoed.
9. Talybolion (3 councillors), the communities of Bodedern, Cylch-y-garn, Llannerch-y-medd, Llanfachreth, Llanfaethlu, Mechell and Tref Alaw.
10. Twrcelyn (3 councillors), the communities of Amlwch, Llanbadrig, Llaneilian, and Rhosybol.
11. Ynys Gybi (3 councillors), the Holy Island communities of Trearddur and Rhoscolyn, plus the Holyhead community wards of Maeshyfryd and Kingsland.

== See also ==
- 2013 Isle of Anglesey County Council election
- List of electoral wards in Wales
