= Aethwy (electoral ward) =

Electoral ward in Anglesey, Wales

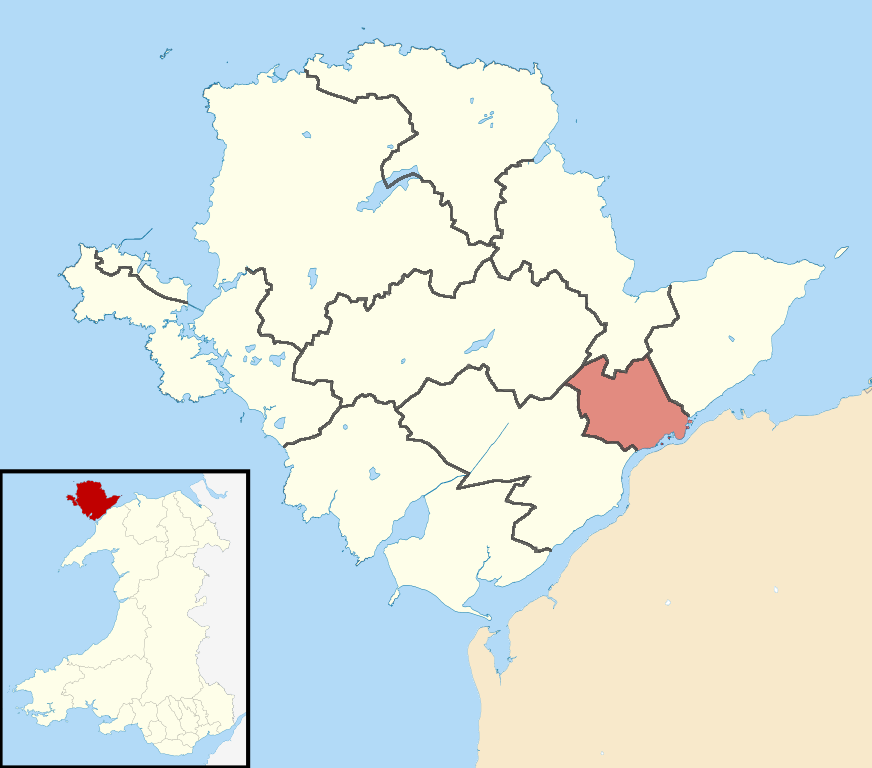
Aethwy ward location on Anglesey

Aethwy is an electoral ward in the south of Anglesey, Wales, created in 2012. It contains the population centres of Menai Bridge and Llanfair PG.

Aethwy covers the communities of Llanfair Pwllgwyngyll, Menai Bridge and Penmynydd. The ward elects three county councillors to the Isle of Anglesey County Council. Aethwy is bordered to the southwest by Bro Rhosyr and to the northeast by the Seiriol ward.

The Aethwy ward was created following the Isle of Anglesey electoral boundary changes in 2012, which created 11 multi-councillor wards from 40 single-councillor wards. The new ward replaced the former county wards of Braint, Cadnant, Gwyngyll and Tysilio, which each elected one county councillor. Penmynydd was part of the Llanfihangel Ysgeifiog county ward.

== Elections results ==
At the inaugural May 2013 county elections the ward poll was topped by Independent councillor Jim Evans. Plaid Cymru candidates, Alun Mummery and Meirion Jones, came second and third. The turnout was 49.1%.

Councillor Evans, a sub-postmaster from Llanfair PG, was elected as chairman of Anglesey County Council for 2015/16.

At the May 2017 county elections, Plaid Cymru won all three Aethwy seats. Councillors Jones and Mummery came first and third respectively, with Robin Wyn Williams in second place.
