= 2017 East Sussex County Council election =

Election

← 2013	4 May 2017	2021 →

All 50 seats to East Sussex County Council 26 seats needed for a majority
	First party	Second party
Party	Conservative	Liberal Democrats
Seats before	22	9
Seats won	30	11
Seat change	▲8	▲2
	Third party	Fourth party
Party	Labour	UKIP
Seats before	7	8
Seats won	4	0
Seat change	▼3	▼8
- Map showing the results of the 2017 East Sussex County Council election.
Council control before election
No Overall Control
Council control after election
Conservative Party (UK)

The 2017 East Sussex County Council election took place on 4 May 2017 as part of the 2017 local elections in the United Kingdom. All councillors were to be elected from electoral divisions by first-past-the-post voting for a four-year term of office.

Boundary changes to the electoral divisions will take effect at this election after a review of the county by the Local Government Boundary Commission for England. This has led to an increase in the size of the Council from 49 to 50 and the splitting of former multi-member divisions.

== Results ==
The Conservatives took control of the council, with all UKIP's seats lost. Labour had a 3-seat loss, and the Liberal Democrats took 2 seats.

== Election results ==
East Sussex County Council election, 2017
Party	Seats	Gains	Losses	Net gain/loss	Seats %	Votes %	Votes	+/−
Conservative	30	10	0	▲10	60	45.6	69,748	▲14
Liberal Democrats	11	1	0	▲1	22	22.8	34,893	▲8
Labour	4	0	3	▼3	6	14.7	22,488	▲0.3
Independent	3	0	0	Steady	6	4.2	6,381	▼1
No description	2	0	0	Steady	4	2.4	3,724	N/A
Green	0	0	0	Steady	0	5.8	8,803	▲2.8
UKIP	0	0	7	▼7	0	3.6	5,479	▼23.7

== Eastbourne ==
=== Devonshire ===
Devonshire
Party	Candidate	Votes	%
Liberal Democrats	Steve Wallis*	1,424	49.2
Conservative	Robert Whippy	657	22.7
Labour	Paul Howard	463	16.0
UKIP	Rachel Large	232	8.1
Green	Linda Wintle	117	4.0
Majority			
Turnout		2,893	32.00
Liberal Democrats hold			

=== Hampden Park ===
Hampden Park
Party	Candidate	Votes	%
Liberal Democrats	Colin Swansborough	1,339	55.0
Conservative	Mozmil Hussain	632	26.0
Labour	Dave Poole	345	14.2
Green	Ivor Heuting	119	4.9
Majority			
Turnout		2,160	29.1
Liberal Democrats hold			

=== Langney ===
Langney
Party	Candidate	Votes	%
Liberal Democrats	Alan Shuttleworth*	1,646	64.4
Conservative	Christopher Whippy	561	22.0
UKIP	Ian Garbutt	160	6.3
Labour	Lee Comfort	144	5.6
Green	Rosana Jimenez	44	1.7
Majority			
Turnout			
Liberal Democrats hold			

=== Meads ===
Meads
Party	Candidate	Votes	%
Conservative	Barry Taylor*	2,213	59.6
Liberal Democrats	Robin Maxted	918	24.7
Labour	Jean Couture	236	6.4
Green	Sally Boys	187	5.0
UKIP	Christopher Holloway	157	4.2
Majority			
Turnout			
Conservative hold			

=== Old Town ===
Old Town
Party	Candidate	Votes	%
Liberal Democrats	John Ungar*	2,074	55.7
Conservative	Vivienne de Havilland-Geraghty	1,123	30.2
Labour	Jake Lambert	342	9.2
Green	Alex Hough	184	4.9
Majority			
Turnout			
Liberal Democrats hold			

=== Ratton ===
Ratton
Party	Candidate	Votes	%
Conservative	Colin Belsey*	2,054	62.6
Liberal Democrats	Marcus von Thiele	697	21.2
Labour	John Lambert	256	7.8
UKIP	Rex Kosters	181	5.5
Green	Pippa Oliphant	95	2.9
Majority			
Turnout			
Conservative hold			

=== St Anthony's ===
St Anthony's
Party	Candidate	Votes	%
Liberal Democrats	David Tutt*	1,834	59.5
Conservative	Jamie Hollywood	847	27.5
Labour	Jackie Ferguson	192	6.2
UKIP	Colin Horscroft	150	4.9
Green	Nick Symons	60	1.9
Majority			
Turnout			
Liberal Democrats hold			

=== Sovereign ===
Sovereign
Party	Candidate	Votes	%
Conservative	David Elkin*	1,998	64.3
Liberal Democrats	Kate Daly	829	26.7
Labour	Natasha Duursma	195	6.3
Green	Hugh Patrick	83	2.7
Majority			
Turnout			
Conservative hold			

=== Upperton ===
Upperton
Party	Candidate	Votes	%
Liberal Democrats	Pat Rodohan*	1,634	48.3
Conservative	Diane Mulkeirins	1,254	37.1
Labour	Paul Richards	241	7.1
Green	Dorothy Forsyth	138	4.1
UKIP	Amanda Sheehan	116	3.4
Majority			
Turnout			
Liberal Democrats hold			

== Hastings ==
=== Ashdown and Conquest ===
Ashdown and Conquest
Party	Candidate	Votes	%
Conservative	Peter Pragnell*	1,599	62.0
Labour Co-op	Eileen Masters	720	27.9
Liberal Democrats	Robert Wakeford	190	7.4
Green	Gabriel Carlyle	71	2.8
Majority			
Turnout			
Conservative hold			

=== Baird and Ore ===
Baird and Ore
Party	Candidate	Votes	%
Conservative	Laurie Loe	1,182	47.2
Labour	Kim Forward	1,111	44.4
Liberal Democrats	Katy Hunter-Burbridge	112	4.5
Green	Judy Scott	97	3.9
Majority			
Turnout			
Conservative gain from Labour			

=== Braybrooke and Castle ===
Braybrooke and Castle
Party	Candidate	Votes	%
Labour	Godfrey Daniel*	1,848	58.6
Conservative	Rob Cooke	684	21.7
Liberal Democrats	Xan Brooker	371	11.8
Green	Andrea Needham	252	8.0
Majority			
Turnout			
Labour hold			

=== Central St Leonards and Gensing ===
Central St Leonards and Gensing
Party	Candidate	Votes	%
Labour	Trevor Webb*	1,520	53.7
Conservative	Graeme Williams	784	27.7
Green	Paul Homer	280	9.9
Liberal Democrats	Tony Seymour	247	8.7
Majority			
Turnout			
Labour hold			

=== Hollington and Wishing Tree ===
Hollington and Wishing Tree
Party	Candidate	Votes	%
Labour	Phil Scott*	1,289	56.2
Conservative	John Rankin	795	34.6
Liberal Democrats	Stephen Milton	108	4.7
Green	Arkady Johns	103	4.5
Majority			
Turnout			
Labour hold			

=== Maze Hill and West St Leonards ===
Maze Hill and West St Leonards
Party	Candidate	Votes	%
Conservative	Matthew Beaver	1,391	51.7
Labour	Steve Thorpe	807	30.0
Liberal Democrats	Eve Montgomery	285	10.6
Independent	Diane Granger	112	4.2
Green	Thaddeus Skews	94	3.5
Majority			
Turnout			
Conservative gain from Labour			

=== Old Hastings and Tressell ===
Old Hastings and Tressell
Party	Candidate	Votes	%
Labour	Tania Charman	1,414	54.4
Conservative	Claire Hammill	740	28.5
Green	Julia Hilton	284	10.9
Liberal Democrats	John Faulkner	163	6.3
Majority			
Turnout			
Labour hold			

=== St Helens and Silverhill ===
St Helens and Silverhill
Party	Candidate	Votes	%
Conservative	Martin Clarke	1,643	50.4
Labour	Judy Rogers	1,228	37.7
Liberal Democrats	Stewart Rayment	258	7.9
Green	Sally Phillips	129	4.0
Majority			
Turnout			
Conservative gain from Labour			

== Lewes ==
=== Chailey ===
Chailey
Party	Candidate	Votes	%
Conservative	Jim Sheppard*	1,957	60.2
Liberal Democrats	Peter Gardiner	784	24.1
Labour	Nicholas Belcher	311	9.6
Green	Holly Atkins	200	6.2
Majority			
Turnout			
Conservative hold			

=== Lewes ===
Lewes
Party	Candidate	Votes	%
Independent	Ruth O'Keeffe	2,370	55.4
Liberal Democrats	Oliver Henman	757	17.7
Labour	Emily Clarke	568	13.3
Green	Tony Rowell	302	7.1
Conservative	Jane Slater	263	6.1
Socialist	Howard Pilott	19	0.4
Majority			
Turnout			52.61
Independent hold			

=== Newhaven and Bishopstone ===
Newhaven and Bishopstone
Party	Candidate	Votes	%
Liberal Democrats	Darren Grover	1,239	39.1
Conservative	Pater Charlton*	1,194	37.6
Labour	Andrew Bryant	319	10.1
UKIP	Ian Buchanan	227	7.2
Green	Mark Bullock	101	3.2
Independent	Laurence Pulling	92	2.9
Majority			
Turnout			37.12
Liberal Democrats hold			

=== Ouse Valley West and Down ===
Ouse Valley West and Down
Party	Candidate	Votes	%
Liberal Democrats	Sarah Jane Osborne	1,722	51.8
Conservative	Roy Burman	1,253	37.7
Labour	Jerry Gould	205	6.2
Green	Anthony Shuster	144	4.3
Majority			
Turnout			43.09
Liberal Democrats gain from UKIP			

=== Peacehaven ===
Peacehaven
Party	Candidate	Votes	%
Conservative	Nigel Enever	1,446	54.1
Labour	Ciarron Clarkson	720	27.0
UKIP	Phil Howson	310	11.6
Liberal Democrats	Lee St Clair	118	4.4
Green	Lesley Orr	77	2.9
Majority			
Turnout			
Conservative gain from UKIP			

=== Ringmer and Lewes Bridge ===
Ringmer and Lewes Bridge
Party	Candidate	Votes	%
Liberal Democrats	Philip Daniel	1,492	33.0
Green	Johnny Denis	1,385	30.6
Conservative	Paul Gander	1,116	24.7
Labour	Belinda Chapman	412	9.1
UKIP	Tony Best	121	2.7
Majority			
Turnout			52.95
Liberal Democrats hold			

=== Seaford North ===
Seaford North
Party	Candidate	Votes	%
Conservative	Phil Boorman	1,767	52.3
Liberal Democrats	Ian Cairns	1,000	29.6
Labour	John Edson	260	7.7
UKIP	Eric Woodward	232	6.9
Green	Mary De Pleave	119	3.5
Majority			
Turnout			39.62
Conservative gain from UKIP			

=== Seaford South ===
Seaford South
Party	Candidate	Votes	%
Liberal Democrats	Carolyn Lambert*	1,670	44.9
Conservative	Sam Adeniji	1,494	40.2
Labour	Steve Floor	277	7.5
UKIP	Pete Leeming	172	4.6
Green	Emily O'Brien	105	2.8
Majority			
Turnout			42.35
Liberal Democrats hold			

=== Telscombe ===
Telscombe
Party	Candidate	Votes	%
Conservative	Andy Smith	1,575	55.2
Labour	Julie Anne Vaughan	723	25.3
UKIP	Deborah Holt	226	7.9
Liberal Democrats	Charlie Carr	222	7.8
Green	Zoe Nicholson	108	3.8
Majority			
Turnout			33.14
Conservative gain from UKIP			

== Rother ==
=== Battle and Crowhurst ===
Battle and Crowhurst
Party	Candidate	Votes	%
Liberal Democrats	Kathryn Field*	1,465	48.3
Conservative	Alistair Douglas	1,080	35.6
Labour	Antonia Berelson	357	11.8
UKIP	Michael Phillips	132	4.4
Majority			
Turnout			40.23
Liberal Democrats hold			

=== Bexhill East ===
Bexhill East
Party	Candidate	Votes	%
Independent	Charles Clark*	919	35.3
Conservative	Gillian Johnson	801	30.8
Labour	Roger McCarthy	362	13.9
Liberal Democrats	Diane Smith	306	11.8
UKIP	Geoffrey Bastin	216	8.3
Majority			
Turnout			32.98
Independent hold			

=== Bexhill North ===
Bexhill North
Party	Candidate	Votes	%
Conservative	Michael Ensor*	1,275	44.8
Labour	Andy Batsford	798	28.0
Independent	Helen Bridger	382	13.4
UKIP	Trevor Clements	245	8.6
Liberal Democrats	Graham Martin-Royle	146	5.1
Turnout			35.50
Conservative hold			

=== Bexhill South ===
Bexhill South
Party	Candidate	Votes	%
Conservative	Simon Elford	1,952	58.5
Labour	Richard Sage	741	22.2
Liberal Democrats	Vivienne Bond	459	13.8
UKIP	Sheila Allen-Rodgers	186	5.6
Majority			
Turnout			35.83
Conservative gain from UKIP			

=== Bexhill West ===
Bexhill West
Party	Candidate	Votes	%
Independent	Stuart Earl*	2,056	50.4
Conservative	Martin Kenward	1,356	33.3
Labour	Samuel Coleman	290	7.1
Liberal Democrats	Joel Kemp	227	5.6
UKIP	Alf Lovell	148	3.6
Majority			
Turnout			46.31
Independent hold			

=== Brede Valley and Marsham ===
Brede Valley and Marsham
Party	Candidate	Votes	%
Conservative	Carl Maynard*	2,016	67.0
Labour	Andy Ives	414	13.7
Liberal Democrats	Ian Stone	408	13.6
UKIP	Lynne Hehir	173	5.7
Majority			
Turnout			38.51
Conservative hold			

=== Northern Rother ===
Northern Rother
Party	Candidate	Votes	%
Conservative	Angharad Davies*	1,719	58.9
Liberal Democrats	Sue Prochak	782	26.8
Labour	Larry Hyett	241	8.3
UKIP	Edward Tuddenham	177	6.1
Majority			
Turnout			40.78
Conservative hold			

=== Rother North West ===
Rother North West
Party	Candidate	Votes	%
Conservative	John Barnes*	1,686	62.0
Liberal Democrats	Mary Varrall	623	22.9
Labour	Sara Watson	254	9.3
UKIP	Edward Smith	157	5.8
Majority			
Turnout			36.43
Conservative hold			

=== Rye and Eastern Rother ===
Rye and Eastern Rother
Party	Candidate	Votes	%
Conservative	Keith Glazier*	1,697	55.5
Labour Co-op	Nigel Jennings	641	21.0
Liberal Democrats	Derek Greenup	318	10.4
UKIP	Alison Phillips	204	6.7
Green	Adam Smith	197	6.4
Majority			
Turnout			38.48
Conservative hold			

== Wealden ==
=== Alfriston, East Hoathly & Hellingly ===
Alfriston, East Hoathly & Hellingly
Party	Candidate	Votes	%
Conservative	Nick Bennett*	1,706	59.2
Liberal Democrats	Chris Bowers	568	19.7
Green	Kay Syrad	217	7.5
Labour	Anthony Fielding	199	6.9
UKIP	Chris Magness	192	6.7
Majority			
Turnout			38.02
Conservative hold			

At the previous election the UKIP candidate polled 29.4%

=== Crowborough North and Jarvis Brook ===
Crowborough North and Jarvis Brook
Party	Candidate	Votes	%
Conservative	Richard Stogdon*	1,546	61.8
Liberal Democrats	Karen Shaw	439	17.5
Labour	Sarah Newman	292	11.7
Green	Colin Stocks	225	9.0
Majority		1007	
Turnout			32.27
Conservative hold			

=== Crowborough South and St Johns ===
Crowborough South and St Johns
Party	Candidate	Votes	%
Conservative	Sylvia Tidy*	1,774	69.0
Liberal Democrats	Adrian Morris	441	17.1
Labour	Brendan Clegg	198	7.7
Green	Gabrielle Symonds	159	6.2
Majority			
Turnout			
Conservative hold			

=== Forest Row and Groombridge ===
Forest Row and Groombridge
Party	Candidate	Votes	%
Conservative	Francis Whetstone*	1,468	45.8
Green	Keith Obbard	1,406	43.9
Liberal Democrats	Tessa Younger	331	10.3
Majority			
Turnout			
Conservative hold			

At the previous election this seat also had UKIP and Labour candidates, who polled 28.9% and 5.7% respectively.

=== Hailsham Market ===
Hailsham Market
Party	Candidate	Votes	%
Conservative	Bob Bowdler	943	40.9
Liberal Democrats	Alexa Clarke	609	26.4
Labour	Louise Orbell	401	17.4
UKIP	Laurence Keeley*	353	15.3
Majority			
Turnout			
Conservative gain from UKIP			

=== Hailsham New Town ===
Hailsham New Town
Party	Candidate	Votes	%
Conservative	Gerard Fox	1,283	52.4
Liberal Democrats	Gavin Blake-Coggins	634	25.9
Labour	Mark Osborn	364	14.9
Green	Charlotte Still	166	6.8
Majority			
Turnout			29.51
Conservative hold			

=== Heathfield and Mayfield ===
Heathfield and Mayfield
Party	Candidate	Votes	%
Conservative	Rupert Simmons*	2,217	70.6
Liberal Democrats	Fraser Kerr	374	11.9
Labour	David Newman	347	11.1
Green	Clare Whistler	202	6.4
Majority			
Turnout			36.18
Conservative hold			

=== Maresfield and Buxted ===
Maresfield and Buxted
Party	Candidate	Votes	%
Conservative	Roy Galley*	2,381	69.6
Liberal Democrats	James Edwards	453	13.2
Green	Ian Tysh	310	9.1
Labour	Gareth Looker	278	8.1
Majority			
Turnout			
Conservative hold			

=== Pevensey and Stone Cross ===
Pevensey and Stone Cross
Party	Candidate	Votes	%
Conservative	Tom Liddiard	1,161	47.2
UKIP	Mike Pursglove*	431	17.5
Independent	Daniel Brookbank	366	14.9
Liberal Democrats	Wendy Dash	272	11.1
Labour	Tim MacPherson	169	6.9
Green	Iona Rowan	59	2.4
Majority			
Turnout			
Conservative gain from UKIP			

=== Polegate and Watermill ===
Polegate and Watermill
Party	Candidate	Votes	%
Independent	Daniel Shing*	1,810	52.9
Conservative	David Watts	1,017	29.7
Liberal Democrats	Steve Murphy	225	6.6
UKIP	Bernie Goodwin	175	5.1
Labour	Alex Mthobi	135	3.9
Green	Peter Wright	62	1.8
Majority			
Turnout			38.91
Independent hold			

=== Uckfield North ===
Uckfield North
Party	Candidate	Votes	%
Conservative	Claire Dowling*	1,350	53.3
Liberal Democrats	Paul Sparks	815	32.1
Labour	Robert Williams	268	10.6
Green	Melissa Tysh	102	4.0
Majority			
Turnout			35.54
Conservative hold			

=== Uckfield South with Framfield ===
Uckfield South with Framfield
Party	Candidate	Votes	%
Conservative	Chris Dowling*	1,558	59.9
Liberal Democrats	Paul Meakin	552	21.2
Labour	William Ball	314	12.1
Green	Pamela Tysh	176	6.8
Majority			
Turnout			37.41
Conservative hold			

At the last election the UKIP candidate polled 32.2%.

=== Wealden East ===
Wealden East
Party	Candidate	Votes	%
Conservative	Bill Bentley*	1,973	57.2
Liberal Democrats	Paul Coleshill	614	17.8
Labour	Jane Vinnicombe	326	9.4
UKIP	Hannah Shoubridge	282	8.2
Green	Eve Ashley	257	7.4
Majority			
Turnout			38.94
Conservative hold			

=== Wealden North East ===
Wealden North East
Party	Candidate	Votes	%
Conservative	Bob Standley*	1,926	68.2
Liberal Democrats	Beverley Johnstone	407	14.4
Green	Beth Martin	285	10.1
Labour	Christopher Morris	206	7.3
Majority			
Turnout			36.82
Conservative hold			

=== Willingdon and South Downs ===
Willingdon and South Downs
Party	Candidate	Votes	%
Independent	Stephen Shing*	1,914	49.8
Conservative	Douglas Murray	1,309	34.0
Liberal Democrats	Christopher Hartley	292	7.6
UKIP	Maureen Goodwin	124	3.2
Labour	Jill Shacklock	110	2.9
Green	Jennifer Howells	97	2.5
Majority			
Turnout			
Independent hold			
