= 2013 Isle of Anglesey County Council election =

2013 Welsh local government election

- 2 May 2013

All 30 seats to Isle of Anglesey County Council 16 seats needed for a majority
	First party	Second party	Third party
Party	Independent	Plaid Cymru	Labour
Seats before	16	6	4
Seats won	14	12	3
Seat change	▼2	▲6	▼1
- Map showing the results of the 2013 Isle of Anglesey Council elections. Striped divisions have mixed representation.
Council control before election
No overall control
Council control after election
No overall control

An election to the Isle of Anglesey County Council was held as part of the 2013 United Kingdom local elections and took place on 2 May 2013. Anglesey was the only Welsh authority voting in 2013, the election having been postponed from 2012 by the Welsh Government, in order to allow an electoral review to take place. The next full council election took place on 4 May 2017.

== Boundary review ==
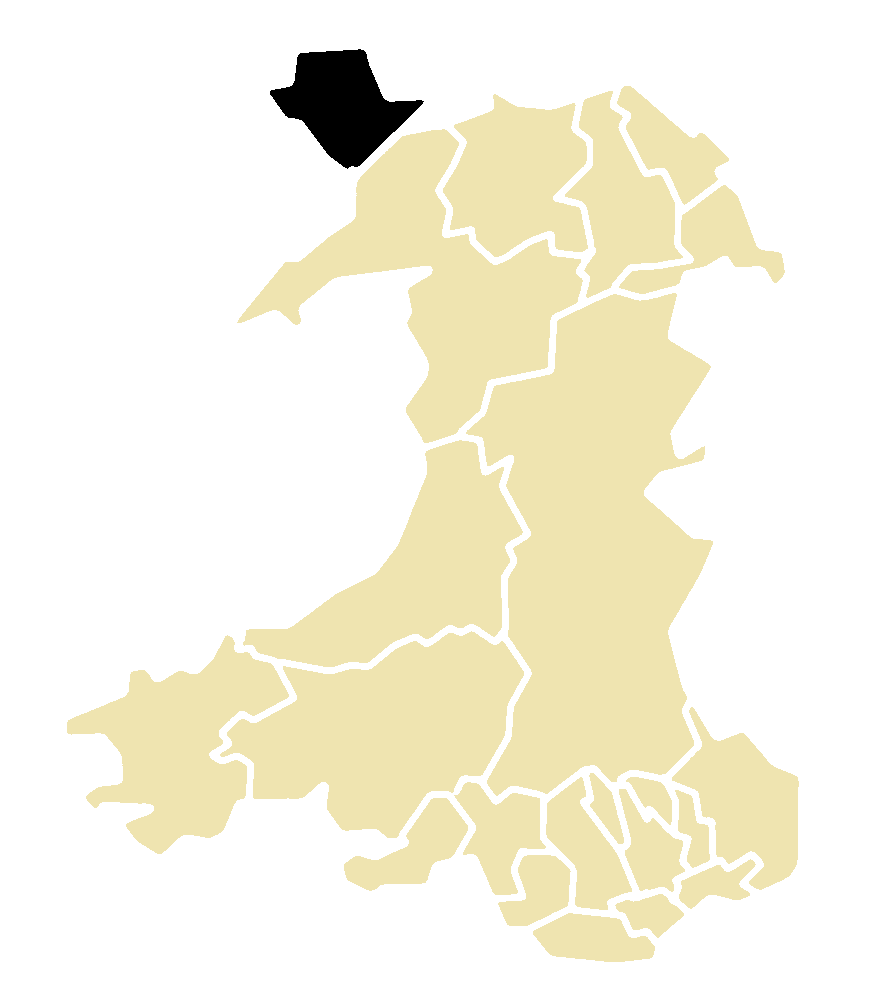
Map showing the location of Isle of Anglesey County Council in Wales Key: Anglesey County Council under No Overall Control The rest of Wales where no elections were held

Under The Isle of Anglesey (Electoral Arrangements) Order 2012, thirty seats (a reduction from the previous 40) were created, from eleven (previously 40) electoral divisions, by the Local Government Boundary Commission for Wales.

== Overall results ==
Turnout for the election was 50.5% of eligible voters. Independent councillors won more seats than any other group, but Plaid Cymru made strong gains, saying they would find it difficult to work with the independent group and hoped to form an alliance with Labour. The island's Returning Officer described democracy on the island as being "invigorated".

Isle of Anglesey County Council election, 2013
Party	Seats	Gains	Losses	Net gain/loss	Seats %	Votes %	Votes	+/−
Independent	14			-9	46.7	29.2	9,958	-27.0
Plaid Cymru	12			+4	40.0	26.4	9,021	+5.2
Labour	3			-2	10.0	17.4	5,933	+4.7
Liberal Democrats	1			-1	3.3	6.0	2,038	+1.6
UKIP	0			0	0.0	13.0	4,447	+12.5
Conservative	0			-2	0.0	8.0	2,714	+3.0

== Results by ward ==
=== Aethwy ===
Aethwy (3 seats)
Party	Candidate	Votes	%	±%
Plaid Cymru	Alun Mummery	1,091	26.0	
Plaid Cymru	Meirion Jones	1,037		
Independent	Jim Evans	762	18.2	
Liberal Democrats	Selwyn Williams	731	17.4	
Plaid Cymru	Phil Roberts	712		
Independent	Keith Evans	506	12.1	
Liberal Democrats	Sue James	409		
UKIP	Elaine Gill	401	9.6	
Liberal Democrats	Gwyn Jones	361		
Labour	Mike Carey	340	8.1	
Conservative	Steve Ransome	189	4.5	
Turnout				
Plaid Cymru win (new seat)				
Plaid Cymru win (new seat)				
Independent win (new seat)				

=== Bro Aberffraw ===
Bro Aberffraw (2 seats)
Party	Candidate	Votes	%	±%
Independent	Peter Rogers	566	23.0	
Plaid Cymru	Ann Griffith	539	21.9	
Plaid Cymru	Elizabeth Rees	347		
Independent	Brian Owen	337	13.7	
Independent	Glyn Jones	314	12.8	
Labour	Gwen Burns	230	9.3	
Independent	Robert Hughes	188	7.6	
UKIP	Frank Wykes	168	6.8	
Conservative	Barrie Freeman	120	4.9	
Turnout				
Independent win (new seat)				
Plaid Cymru win (new seat)				

=== Bro Rhosyr ===
Bro Rhosyr (2 seats)
Party	Candidate	Votes	%	±%
Independent	Hywel Jones	936	30.3	
Independent	Victor Hughes	563	18.2	
Plaid Cymru	Richard Parry	552	17.9	
Independent	Nia Evans	440	14.2	
Plaid Cymru	Dewi ap Rhobert	303		
Labour	Einion Williams	258	8.3	
UKIP	Carla Teixeira	134	4.3	
Independent	Hywel Jones	109	3.5	
Conservative	Peter Williams	99	3.2	
Turnout				
Independent win (new seat)				
Independent win (new seat)				

=== Caergybi ===
Caergybi (3 seats)
Party	Candidate	Votes	%	±%
Labour	Raymond Jones	1,365	33.1	
Independent	Bob Jones	1,094	26.5	
Labour	Arwel Roberts	751		
Labour	Beryl Warner	747		
UKIP	Afryl Davies	637	15.4	
Independent	Alan Williams	574	13.9	
Plaid Cymru	Jean Williams	324	7.8	
Conservative	John Coates	135	3.3	
Conservative	Philip Eastment	128		
Turnout				
Labour win (new seat)				
Independent win (new seat)				
Labour win (new seat)				

=== Canolbarth Môn ===
Canolbarth Môn (3 seats)
Party	Candidate	Votes	%	±%
Plaid Cymru	Nicola Roberts	1,595	30.3	
Plaid Cymru	Bob Parry	1,399		
Plaid Cymru	Dylan Rees	1,387		
Independent	John Jones	915	17.4	
Independent	Bryan Owen	907	17.2	
Independent	Margaret Thomas	881	16.7	
UKIP	Jana Gill	688	13.1	
Conservative	Terence Hodges	280	5.3	
Turnout				
Plaid Cymru win (new seat)				
Plaid Cymru win (new seat)				
Plaid Cymru win (new seat)				

=== Llifôn ===
Llifôn (2 seats)
Party	Candidate	Votes	%	±%
Independent	Richard Dew	774	26.1	
Independent	Gwilym Jones	672	22.6	
Plaid Cymru	Ken Taylor	409	13.8	
Independent	Colin Torr	343	11.5	
Labour	Charlie Dodd	287	9.7	
Conservative	Martin Peet	248	8.4	
UKIP	Martin Brook	237	8.0	
Conservative	Celfyn Furlong	237		
Turnout				
Independent win (new seat)				
Independent win (new seat)				

=== Lligwy ===
Lligwy (3 seats)
Party	Candidate	Votes	%	±%
Independent	Ieuan Williams	1,152	23.0	
Plaid Cymru	Vaughan Hughes	656	13.1	
Independent	Derlwyn Hughes	620	12.4	
UKIP	Claire Brook	499	10.0	
Independent	Barrie Durkin	475	9.5	
Independent	Jeff Cotterell	439	8.8	
Plaid Cymru	Edward Jones	430		
Plaid Cymru	Margaret Roberts	430		
Independent	Hefin Thomas	426	8.5	
Conservative	Pete Edwards	403	8.1	
Labour	Michael O'Leary	328	6.6	
Labour	Angela Gliddon	324		
Labour	Roger Dobson	230		
Turnout				
Independent win (new seat)				
Plaid Cymru win (new seat)				
Independent win (new seat)				

=== Seiriol ===
Seiriol (3 seats)
Party	Candidate	Votes	%	±%
Plaid Cymru	Lewis Davies	1,294	29.9	
Plaid Cymru	Carwyn Jones	985		
Labour	Alwyn Rowlands	895	20.7	
Plaid Cymru	Eurfryn Davies	870		
Independent	Jason Zalot	755	17.5	
Conservative	Neil Fairlamb	582	13.5	
Labour	Roger Petts	461		
UKIP	Nathan Gill	448	10.4	
Liberal Democrats	Judith Moss	350	8.1	
Turnout				
Plaid Cymru win (new seat)				
Plaid Cymru win (new seat)				
Labour win (new seat)				

=== Talybolion ===
Talybolion (3 seats)
Party	Candidate	Votes	%	±%
Plaid Cymru	Llinos Huws	1,113	30.6	
Independent	Kenneth Hughes	917	25.2	
Plaid Cymru	John Griffith	800		
Independent	Elwyn Schofield	783	21.5	
Plaid Cymru	Emrys Hughes	740		
Labour	Julia Dobson	507	13.9	
UKIP	Peter Smith	321	8.8	
Turnout				
Plaid Cymru win (new seat)				
Independent win (new seat)				
Plaid Cymru win (new seat)				

=== Twrcelyn ===
Twrcelyn (3 seats)
Party	Candidate	Votes	%	±%
Independent	Richard Jones	1,445	25.2	
Liberal Democrats	Aled Jones	1,279	22.1	
Independent	Will Hughes	920	15.9	
Plaid Cymru	Elfed Jones	740	12.8	
Labour	Dylan Jones	707	12.2	
Plaid Cymru	Derek Owen	701		
Labour	Gordon Warren	512		
UKIP	Nadine Hall	408	7.1	
Labour	Daniel ap Eifion-Jones	409		
Conservative	Geoffrey Turner	272	4.7	
Plaid Cymru	John Meredith	237		
Turnout				
Independent win (new seat)				
Liberal Democrats win (new seat)				
Independent win (new seat)				

=== Ynys Gybi ===
Ynys Gybi (3 seats)
Party	Candidate	Votes	%	±%
Plaid Cymru	Trefor Hughes	708	21.5	
Independent	Dafydd Thomas	632	19.2	
Independent	Jeffrey Evans	590	17.9	
UKIP	Barry Roberts	506	15.3	
Labour	William Chorlton	475	14.4	
Conservative	Eric Roberts	386	11.7	
Labour	Keith Roberts	371		
Conservative	Paula Parry	337		
Labour	Joe Lock	318		
Plaid Cymru	Wyndham Davies-Holden	250		
Conservative	Christine Turner	197		
Turnout				
Plaid Cymru win (new seat)				
Independent win (new seat)				
Independent win (new seat)				
