= Isle of Anglesey County Council =

Local government authority in north-west Wales

Isle of Anglesey County Council Cyngor Sir Ynys Môn (Welsh)

Type
- Type: Principal council of Isle of Anglesey

History
- Founded: 1 April 1996
- Preceded by: Gwynedd County Council

Leadership
- Chair: Dafydd Rhys Thomas, Independent since 12 May 2026
- Leader: Gary Pritchard, Plaid Cymru since 26 September 2024
- Chief Executive: Dylan Williams since March 2022

Structure
- Seats: 35 councillors
- Graph of the party split among 35 seats.
- Political groups: Administration (18) Plaid Cymru (18) Other parties (17) Labour (3) Liberal Democrats (1) Reform (1) Independent (12)
- Length of term: 5 years

Elections
- Voting system: First-past-the-post
- Last election: 5 May 2022
- Next election: 6 May 2027

Meeting place
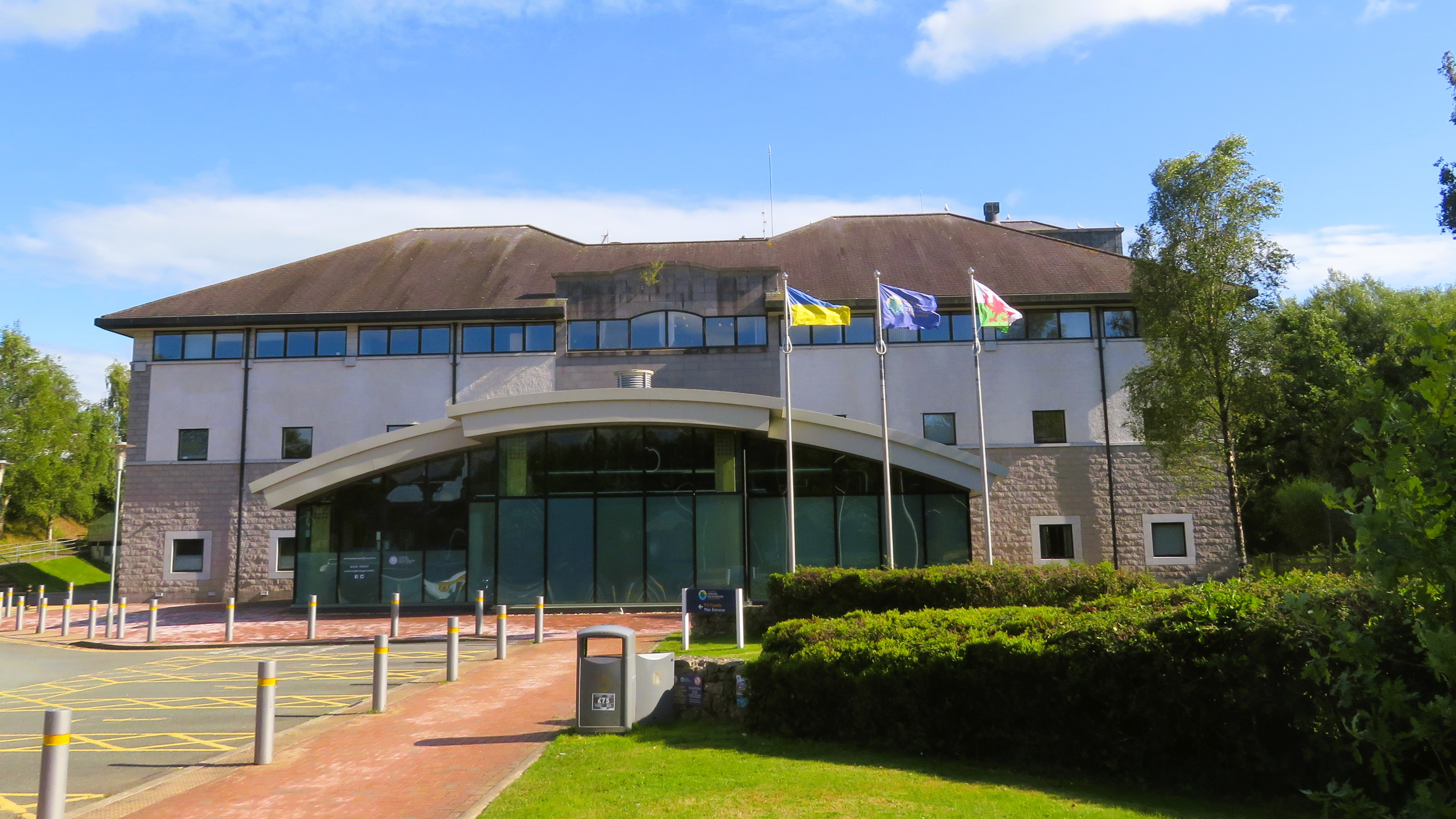
- Council Offices, Mill Street, Llangefni, LL77 7TW

Website
- www.anglesey.gov.uk

The Isle of Anglesey County Council (Welsh: Cyngor Sir Ynys Môn) is the local authority for the county of the Isle of Anglesey, one of the principal areas of Wales. Since 2022 the council has 35 councillors who represent 14 multi-member electoral wards.

== History ==
The first county council for Anglesey was created in 1889 under the Local Government Act 1888, which established elected county councils to take over the administrative functions of the quarter sessions. The original county council did not include "Isle of" in its name, simply being called "Anglesey County Council". That county council and the administrative county of Anglesey were abolished in 1974 under the Local Government Act 1972. Anglesey was merged with the mainland areas of Caernarfonshire, Merioneth, and part of Denbighshire to become a new county called Gwynedd. A lower-tier district was created covering Anglesey, with its council taking over district-level functions from Anglesey's previous eight district councils, which were abolished at the same time:

- Aethwy Rural District
- Amlwch Urban District
- Beaumaris Municipal Borough
- Holyhead Urban District
- Llangefni Urban District
- Menai Bridge Urban District
- Twrcelyn Rural District
- Valley Rural District

The new district was awarded borough status. Uniquely among the 37 districts created in Wales in 1974 it was given a hyphenated name combining both the area's Welsh and English names: "Ynys Môn-Isle of Anglesey". The council was therefore called "Ynys Môn-Isle of Anglesey Borough Council".

Local government across Wales was reorganised again in 1996 under the Local Government (Wales) Act 1994, which replaced the previous two tier system of counties and districts with "principal areas" (each designated either a "county" or a "county borough"), whose councils perform the functions previously divided between the county and district councils. The pre-1996 borough of Ynys Môn-Isle of Anglesey was reconstituted as a county, and so gained administrative independence from Gwynedd. Unlike in 1974, the 1994 Act gave separate English and Welsh names for each principal area, specifying that the new county was to be named "Anglesey" in English and "Sir Fôn" in Welsh. During the transition to the new system, the shadow authority requested a change of name in both languages, to "Isle of Anglesey" in English and "Sir Ynys Môn" in Welsh. The government confirmed the change with effect from 2 April 1996, one day after the new council came into being. Since 1996 the local authority has therefore been "Isle of Anglesey County Council" in English, and "Cyngor Sir Ynys Môn" in Welsh.

=== External supervision ===
The Wales Audit Office described the new council of having a "history of conflict and inappropriate behaviour" from the outset, with two public interest reports published in 1998 and a further three reports into the behaviour by 2001. In September 2009 the council took on a 'troubleshooter' to sort out the squabbling, at a cost of £1,160 a day. David Bowles was imposed on the council by the Welsh Government and paid via a recruitment company. He became Wales' most expensive public sector worker at the time. Bowles sacked two members of the ruling council group, and the education and leisure head was forced to resign.

In March 2011, after "years of political infighting", it became the first council in British history to have all executive functions suspended, with a team of commissioners appointed by the Welsh government put in place to run the council's functions, with elections ultimately delayed, meaning they took place a year after the rest of Wales, pending a new electoral system.

=== Welsh language ===
Welsh and English are the official languages of the council and have equal status and validity in the council's administration and work. According to the council's Welsh language policy, its aim is to ensure that Welsh will be the council's main language for both oral and written internal communication in the future. Of those staff that assessed their language skills in 2016–2017, 79% could speak Welsh fluently.

=== Hacking ===
In February 2019 the council reported that North Korea was likely to have been behind a cyberattack on its systems, carried out through a proxy ISP (IP) address based in Japan. Experts suggested that Anglesey was not likely to have been the specific target, with the hackers engaged in a broader attack on UK government infrastructure.

=== Island Forum ===
In 2022, as part of the Levelling Up White Paper, an "Island Forum" was proposed, which would allow local policymakers and residents in Anglesey to work alongside their counterparts in Orkney, Shetland, the Western Isles and the Isle of Wight on common issues, such as broadband connectivity, and provide a platform for them to communicate directly with the government on the challenges island communities face in terms of levelling up. The council has been a member of the Islands Forum since 2022.

In June 2023, the deputy council leader Ieuan Williams resigned after saying "all Tories should be shot".

== Political control ==
The first election following the Local Government Act 1972 was held in 1973, initially operating as a shadow authority alongside the outgoing authorities before the new borough council came into its powers on 1 April 1974. A shadow authority was again elected in 1995 ahead of the reforms which came into force on 1 April 1996. Political control of the council since 1974 has been as follows:

Lower-tier borough council

Party in control	Years
Independent	1974–1996

Principal area

Party in control	Years
Independent	1996–2013
No overall control	2013–2022
Plaid Cymru	2022–present

After the 2008 elections, the largest faction was the Original Independents. However, in 2010 the council leader, Clive McGregor, left the Original Independents to form Llais Môn (meaning Anglesey Voice) who had five members by the time of the 2013 election.

There were due to be elections on 3 May 2012, but these were postponed for one year by the Welsh Local Government minister, Carl Sargeant. The 2013 Isle of Anglesey County Council election took place on 2 May 2013. The 2017 Isle of Anglesey County Council election on 4 May resulted in a no overall majority position with Plaid Cymru holding 14 of the 30 seats. The 2022 Isle of Anglesey County Council election on 5 May resulted in an overall majority with Plaid Cymru holding 21 of 35 seats.

=== Leadership ===
The leaders of the council since 1996 have been:

Councillor	Party	From	To	Notes
Gareth Winston Roberts	Independent	1996	7 Apr 1998	Independent Group. Resigned in 1998 following the council administration being criticised.
William John Williams	Independent	7 Apr 1998	May 1999	
Goronwy Parry	Conservative	May 1999	Apr 2003	
Bob Parry	Plaid Cymru	4 Apr 2003	Jun 2004	Plaid Cymru-led coalition.
William John Williams	Independent	24 Jun 2004	May 2006	
Gareth Winston Roberts	Independent	May 2006	May 2008	Independent Group
Phil Fowlie	Independent	9 May 2008	May 2009	Original Independents. Resigned his leadership in 2009 and his seat in September 2010.
Clive McGregor	Independent	5 May 2009	May 2011	
Bryan Owen	Independent	12 May 2011	May 2013	Independent Group. Lost his seat at the May 2013 election
Ieuan Williams	Independent	23 May 2013	May 2017	Independent Group
Llinos Medi	Plaid Cymru	23 May 2017	9 Jul 2024	First female leader of the council
Gary Pritchard	Plaid Cymru	26 Sep 2024		

=== Composition ===
Following the 2022 election and subsequent changes of allegiance up to October 2026, the composition of the council was:

Party	Seats
Plaid Cymru	18
Labour	3
Liberal Democrats	1
Reform	1
Independent	12
Total	35

The Liberal Democrat and six of the independent councillors sit together as the "Anglesey Independents" group. Another four independent councillors form the "Independent Group", and the remaining two independents do not form part of a group. The next election is due in 2027.

== Elections ==
Since 2017, council elections have taken place every five years.

Year	Seats	Plaid Cymru	Independent	Labour	Liberal Democrats	Conservative	Notes
1995	40	7	**26**	6	0	1	Independent majority control
1999	40	9	**26**	4	0	1	Independent majority control
2004	40	8	**28**	1	1	2	Independent majority control
2008	40	8	**23**	5	2	2	Independent majority control
2013	30	12	**14**	3	1	0	New ward boundaries.
2017	30	**14**	13	2	1	0	
2022	35	**21**	10	3	1	0	Plaid Cymru majority control. New ward boundaries.

Party with the most elected councillors in bold. Coalition agreements in notes column.

== Premises ==
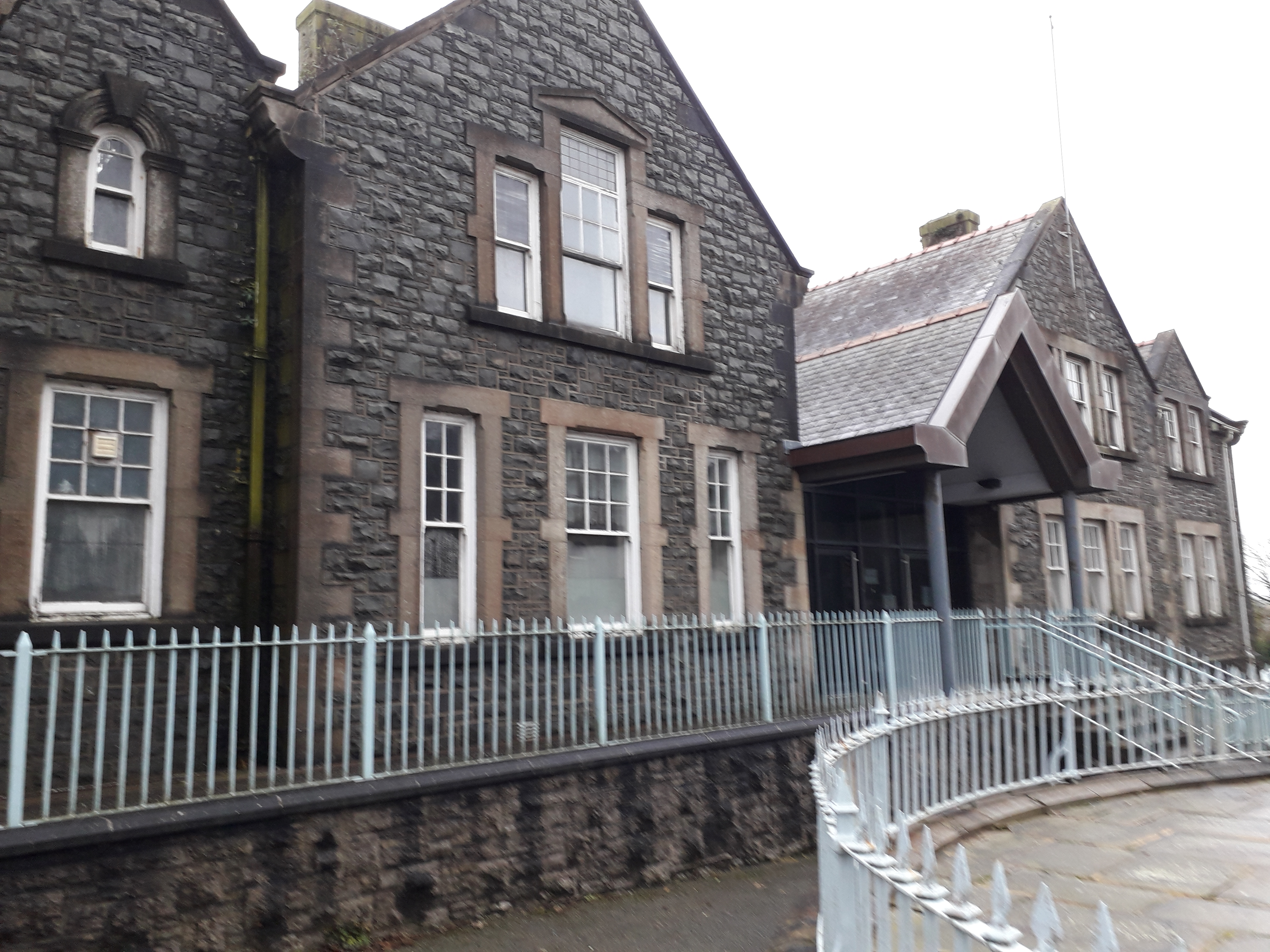
Shire Hall, Glanhwfa Road, Llangefni

From 1889, meetings of the county council were initially held in the county courthouse on the west side of Glanhwfa Road in Llangefni. A new Shire Hall was built in 1899 directly opposite the courthouse, and served as the council's headquarters until the first county council was abolished in 1974. Shire Hall was renamed the "Borough Council Offices" in 1974 when it became the headquarters of Ynys Môn-Isle of Anglesey Borough Council. Following the local government reforms in 1996, new council offices were built at Mill Street (Welsh: Lon-y-Felin) in Llangefni in the late 1990s for the new Isle of Anglesey County Council.

== Electoral divisions ==
From the 1995 council elections until just prior to the elections in 2013, the county was divided into 40 electoral wards returning 40 councillors. There are also 40 communities (parishes) in the county, some of which have their own elected community council, but few communities were coterminous with the 40 council wards. The 40 wards were:

Aberffraw (included Aberffraw community/Maelog ward* part of Llanfaelog), Amlwch Port (Port and Town wards* of Amlwch Town), Amlwch Rural (Rural ward* of Amlwch Town), Beaumaris (Beaumaris), Bodffordd (Bodffordd/Cerrigceinwen ward* of Llangristiolus), Bodorgan (Bodorgan/Llangristiolus ward* of Llangristiolus), Braint (Braint ward* of Llanfair Pwllgwyngyll), Bryngwran (Bryngwran/Trewalchmai), Brynteg (Benllech and Brynteg wards* of Llanfair Mathafarn Eithaf), Cadnant (Cadnant ward* of Menai Bridge), Cefni (Cefni ward* of Llangefni), Cwm Cadnant (Cwm Cadnant), Cyngar (Cyngar ward* of Llangefni), Gwyngyll (Gwyngyll ward* of Llanfair Pwllgwyngyll), Holyhead Town (Town ward* of Holyhead town), Kingsland (Kingsland ward* of Holyhead), Llanbadrig (Llanbadrig), Llanbedrgoch (Benllech 'A'/Llanbedrgoch wards* of Llanfair-Mathafarn-Eithaf), Llanddyfnan (Llanddyfnan/Llaneugrad), Llaneilian (Llaneilian/Rhosybol), Llanfaethlu (Llanfachraeth/Llanfaethlu/Llanrhuddlad ward* of Cylch-y-Garn), Llanfair-yn-Neubwll (Bodedern/Llanfair-yn-Neubwll), Llanfihangel Ysgeifiog (Llanfihangel Ysgeifiog/Penmynydd), Llangoed (Llangoed and Penmon), Llanidan (Llanddaniel Fab/Llanidan), Llannerch-y-medd (Llannerch-y-medd/Tref Alaw), London Road (London Road ward* of Holyhead town), Maeshyfryd (Maeshyfryd ward* of Holyhead town), Mechell (Mechell/Llanfairynghornwy ward* of Cylch-y-Garn), Morawelon (Morawelon ward* of Holyhead), Moelfre (Moelfre), Parc a'r Mynydd (Parc a'r Mynydd ward* of Holyhead town), Pentraeth (Llanddona/Pentraeth), Porthyfelin (Porthyfelin ward* of Holyhead town), Rhosneigr (Rhosneigr ward* of Llanfaelog), Rhosyr (Rhosyr), Trearddur (Rhoscolyn/Trearddur), Tudur (Tudur ward* of Llangefni Town), Tysilio (Tysilio ward* of Menai Bridge) and Valley (Valley).
* = electoral ward of a community with its own electoral subdivisions and community council

=== Electoral review ===
Electoral divisions on the Isle of Anglesey

A review of electoral arrangements on Anglesey by the Local Government Boundary Commission for Wales began in 2010. This was scrapped and recommenced in 2011 following a new instruction by the Welsh Government.

Under The Isle of Anglesey (Electoral Arrangements) Order 2012, there were 30 councillors to be elected (a reduction from the previous 40) from 11 multi-member wards. The electoral wards (numbers of councillors in parentheses) were:

1. **Aethwy** (3), formed by the Communities of Llanfair Pwllgwyngyll, Menai Bridge and Penmynydd
2. **Bro Aberffraw** (2), formed by the Communities of Aberffraw, Bodorgan and Rhosyr
3. **Bro Rhosyr** (2), formed by the Communities of Llanidan, Llanfihangel Ysceifiog, Llanddaniel Fab and Llangristiolus
4. **Caergybi** (3), the electoral wards of Town, London Road, Morawelon, Porthyfelin, and Parc a'r Mynydd in the Community of Holyhead
5. **Canolbarth Môn** (Central Anglesey) (3), the Communities of Bryngwran, Bodffordd, Llangefni, and Trewalchmai, and the electoral wards of Llanddyfnan, Llangwyllog and Tregacan in the Community of Llanddyfnan.
6. **Llifôn** (2), the Communities of Llanfaelog, Llanfair-yn-Neubwll and Valley
7. **Lligwy** (3), the Communities of Moelfre, Llaneugrad, Llanfair-Mathafarn-Eithaf and Pentraeth; and the electoral ward of Llanfihangel Tre'r Beirdd in the Community of Llanddyfnan
8. **Seiriol** (3), formed by the Communities of Beaumaris, Cwm Cadnant, Llanddona, and Llangoed.
9. **Talybolion** (3), formed by the Communities of Bodedern, Cylch-y-garn, Llannerch-y-medd, Llanfachraeth, Llanfaethlu, Mechell and Tref Alaw
10. **Twrcelyn** (3), the Communities of Amlwch, Llanbadrig, Llaneilian, and Rhosybol
11. **Ynys Gybi** (Holy Island) (3), the Communities of Trearddur and Rhoscolyn and the electoral wards of Maeshyfryd and Kingsland in the Community of Holyhead.

For the 2022 election, the wards were again reorganised, with a total of 35 councillors. The wards are now:

- Aethwy (3)
- Bodowyr (2)
- Bro Aberffraw (2)
- Bro'r Llynnoedd ("Lakes district") (2)
- Canolbarth Môn (3)
- Cefni (2)
- Crigyll (2)
- Lligwy (3)
- Parc a'r Mynydd (2)
- Seiriol (3)
- Talybolion (3)
- Tref Cybi (2)("Holyhead Town")
- Twrcelyn (3)
- Ynys Gybi (3)

== See also ==
- Isle of Anglesey electoral boundary changes 2012
