= Amlwch Port =

Village in Anglesey, Wales

Coordinates: 53.415469°N 4.333659°W

Amlwch Port: Welsh: Porth Amlwch
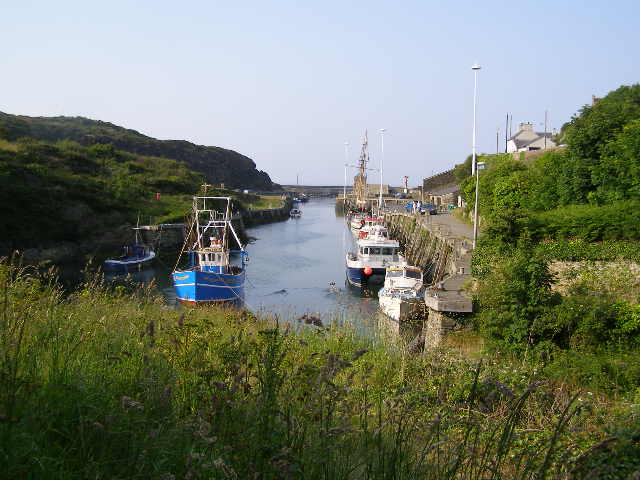

- Location within Anglesey
- Community: Amlwch
- Principal area: Anglesey
- Preserved county: Sir Fôn
- Country: Wales
- Sovereign state: United Kingdom
- Police: North Wales
- Fire: North Wales
- Ambulance: Welsh
- UK Parliament: Ynys Môn
- Senedd Cymru – Welsh Parliament: Ynys Môn

Amlwch Port (Welsh: Porth Amlwch) is a port village in Anglesey, Wales. It is effectively an eastern suburb of the larger town of Amlwch.

Between the 1991 Census and the 2001 Census the records showed Amlwch Port's population had dropped by over 1,000, to 2,628. Anglesey County Council were unsure why the population had dropped (or even whether it had been miscounted).

Prior to the 2013 county council elections, Amlwch Port was one of the 40 electoral wards to the Isle of Anglesey Council. It ceased to be a county ward as a result of The Isle of Anglesey (Electoral Arrangements) Order 2012. According to the 2011 census the population of the ward was 2,507.
