= Canolbarth Môn =

Electoral ward in Anglesey, Wales

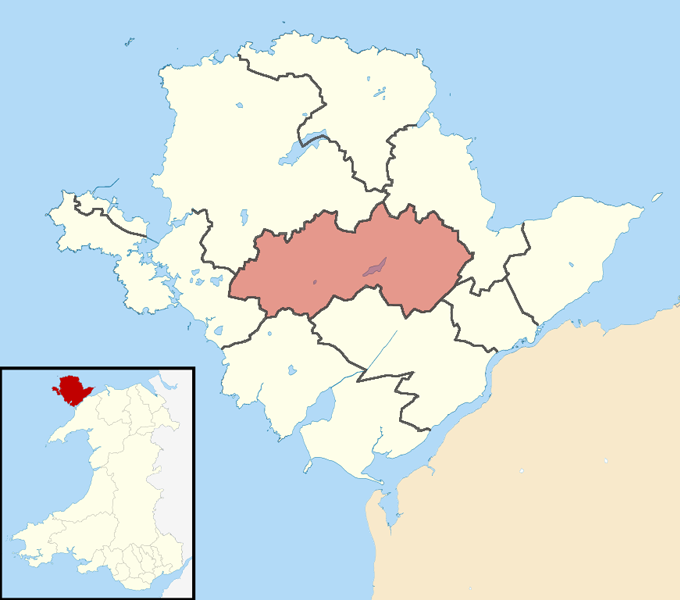
Canolbarth Môn ward location on Anglesey

Canolbarth Môn (meaning: Central Anglesey) is an electoral ward in the centre of Anglesey, Wales. It includes the communities of Bryngwran, Bodffordd, Llangefni, and Trewalchmai, and the majority (excluding the Llanfihangel Tre'r Beirdd community ward) of Llanddyfnan. Canolbarth Môn elects three county councillors to the Isle of Anglesey County Council.

Canolbarth Môn was created following the Isle of Anglesey electoral boundary changes in 2012, which created 11 multi-councillor wards from 40 single-councillor wards. Prior to this Canolbarth Môn was covered by Bryngwran and parts of the Bodffordd, Cefni, Cyngar and Tudur county wards which each elected their own county councillor.

At the county elections on 2 May 2013, leader of the County Council and the Original Independents, Bryan Owen and leader of the Plaid Cymru group, Bob Parry, stood for election in Canolbarth Môn.

Since the May 2017 county elections, the ward has been represented by three Plaid Cymru councillors, Nicola Roberts, Dylan Rees and Bob Parry.

Population: 9097
