= 2017 Isle of Anglesey County Council election =

2017 Welsh local government election

← 2013	4 May 2017	2022 →

All 30 seats to Isle of Anglesey County Council 16 seats needed for a majority
	First party	Second party	Third party
Party	Plaid Cymru	Independent	Labour
Seats before	12	14	3
Seats won	14	13	2
Seat change	▲2	▼1	▼1
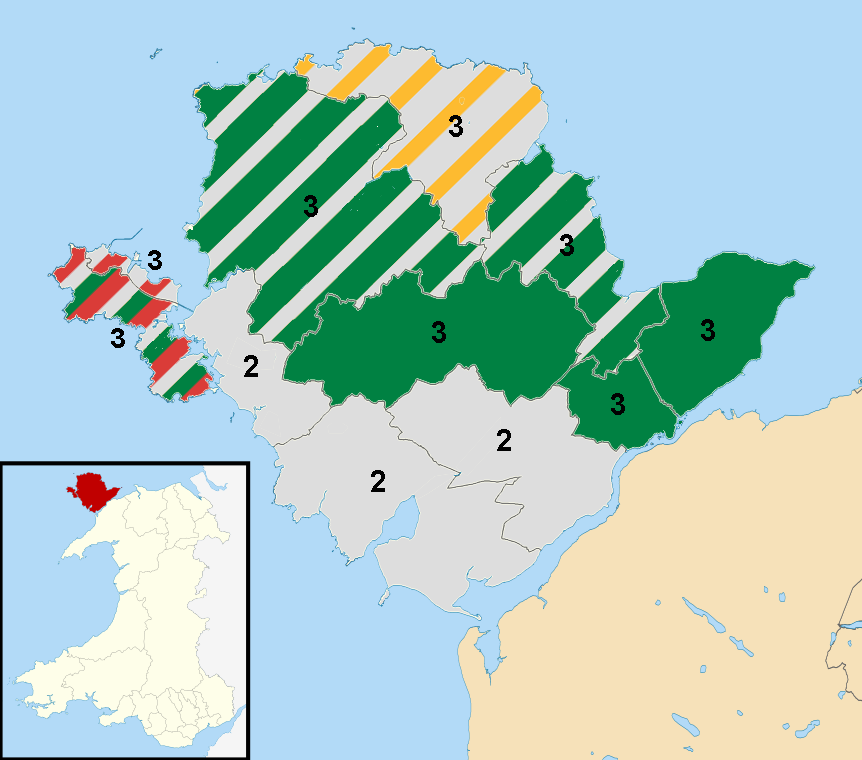
- Map showing the results of the 2017 Isle of Anglesey Council elections. Striped wards have mixed representation.
Council control before election
No overall control
Council control after election
No overall control

The 2017 Isle of Anglesey County Council election, to the Isle of Anglesey County Council was held on 4 May 2017 as part of the 2017 United Kingdom local elections. All 30 council seats were up for election. The previous full election took place in 2013 and the following one in 2022.

== Overall results ==
Following the election Plaid Cymru gained two additional seats overall to become the largest party with 14 councillors. The Independents, ruling the council prior to the election, were reduced to 13 councillors. Previous Independent Group leader, Ieuan Williams, stood down from this position prior to the election. The Independent council leader prior to 2013, Bryan Owen, won a seat in the Bro Aberffraw ward, having previously lost his Canolbarth Môn seat in May 2013. He won by only 6 votes, though a recount was refused by the returning officer.

Isle of Anglesey County Council election, 2017
Party	Seats	Gains	Losses	Net gain/loss	Seats %	Votes %	Votes	+/−
Plaid Cymru	14			▲2	46.7	41.0	20,894	
Independent	13			▼1	43.3	36.7	18,706	
Labour	2			▼1	6.7	14.7	7,470	
Liberal Democrats	1			0	3.3	3.2	1,651	
Conservative	0			0	0.0	4.2	2,146	

Later that month Plaid Cymru leader, Llinos Medi, was the only candidate to put herself forward as leader and Plaid Cymru consequently led the council with the help of support from some Independent members.

== Results by ward ==
* = denotes councillor elected to this ward at the previous election

Isle of Anglesey Council results per ward also give the number of registered electors, number of ballot papers issued and turnout

=== Aethwy ===
Aethwy (3 seats)
Party	Candidate	Votes	%	±%
Plaid Cymru	Meirion Jones *	1,343	48.3	
Plaid Cymru	Robin Williams	1,314		
Plaid Cymru	Alun Mummery *	1,267		
Independent	Selwyn Williams	882	31.7	
Labour	Justin McCoy	553	19.9	
Labour	Jan Hale	505		
Turnout		4,521	47.0	
Plaid Cymru hold		Swing		
Plaid Cymru gain from Independent		Swing		
Plaid Cymru hold		Swing		

=== Bro Aberffraw ===
Bro Aberffraw (2 seats)
Party	Candidate	Votes	%	±%
Independent	Peter Rogers *	793	47.4	
Independent	Bryan Owen	545		
Plaid Cymru	Dilwyn Griffiths	539	32.2	
Labour	Pete Sims	340	20.3	
Plaid Cymru	Tegwyn Roberts	275		
Turnout		2,492	49.7	
Independent hold		Swing		
Independent gain from Plaid Cymru		Swing		

=== Bro Rhosyr ===
Bro Rhosyr (2 seats)
Party	Candidate	Votes	%	±%
Independent	Dafydd Roberts	880	45.2	
Independent	Eric Jones	858		
Plaid Cymru	Mathew Thomas	736	37.8	
Independent	Dafydd Owen	613		
Labour	Einion Williams	333	17.1	
Turnout		3,420	53.7	
Independent hold		Swing		
Independent hold		Swing		

=== Caergybi ===
Caergybi (3 seats)
Party	Candidate	Votes	%	±%
Independent	Bob Jones	1,049	42.1	
Independent	Shaun Redmond	673		
Labour	Glyn Haynes	625	25.1	
Plaid Cymru	Keith Thomas	559	22.4	
Labour	Alan Williams	540		
Labour	Beryl Warner	515		
Plaid Cymru	Ken Taylor	391		
Independent	Ken Tatlock	369		
Conservative	Philip Eastment	261	10.5	
Turnout		4,982	39.7	
Independent hold		Swing		
Independent gain from Labour		Swing		
Labour hold		Swing		
