= List of places in Gwynedd (categorised) =

This is a categorised list of places in the principal area of Gwynedd, north Wales. See the list of places in Wales for places in other principal areas.

== Administrative divisions ==
=== Electoral wards ===
Since 2004 there have been 71 county electoral wards in Gwynedd.

==== Arfon ====
- Arllechwedd
- Bethel
- Bontnewydd
- Cadnant
- Cwm y Glo
- Deiniol
- Deiniolen
- Dewi
- Y Felinheli
- Garth
- Gerlan
- Glyder
- Groeslon
- Hendre
- Hirael
- Llanberis
- Llanllyfni
- Llanrug
- Llanwnda
- Marchog
- Menai (Bangor)
- Menai (Caernarfon)
- Ogwen
- Peblig
- Penisarwaun
- Pentir
- Penygroes
- Seiont
- Tregarth and Mynydd Llandygai
- Waunfawr

==== Dwyfor ====
- Aberdaron
- Abererch
- Abersoch
- Botwnnog
- Clynnog Fawr
- Criccieth
- Dolbenmaen
- Efailnewydd/Buan
- Llanaelhaearn
- Llanbedrog
- Llanengan
- Llanystumdwy
- Morfa Nefyn
- Nefyn
- Porthmadog Tremadog
- Porthmadog East
- Porthmadog West
- Pwllheli South
- Pwllheli North
- Tudweiliog

==== Meirionnydd ====
- Aberdyfi
- Barmouth
- Bala
- Bowydd and Rhiw
- Brithdir and Llanfachreth / Y Ganllwyd / Llanelltyd
- Corris / Mawddwy
- Diffwys and Maenofferen
- Dolgellau South
- Dolgellau North
- Dyffryn Ardudwy
- Harlech/Talsarnau
- Llanbedr
- Llandderfel
- Llangelynnin
- Llanuwchllyn
- Penrhyndeudraeth
- Bryncrug / Llanfihangel
- Teigl
- Trawsfynydd
- Tywyn

=== Communities ===
This is a list of local communities:

- Aber
- Aberdaron
- Aberdyfi
- Arthog
- Bala
- Bangor
- Barmouth
- Beddgelert
- Bethesda
- Betws Garmon
- Bontnewydd
- Botwnnog
- Brithdir and Llanfachreth
- Bryn-crug
- Buan
- Caernarfon
- Clynnog
- Corris
- Criccieth
- Dolbenmaen
- Dolgellau
- Dyffryn Ardudwy
- Ffestiniog
- Ganllwyd
- Harlech
- Llanaelhaearn
- Llanbedr
- Llanbedrog
- Llanberis
- Llanddeiniolen
- Llandderfel
- Llandwrog
- Llandygai
- Llanegryn
- Llanelltyd
- Llanengan
- Llanfair
- Llanfihangel-y-Pennant
- Llanfrothen
- Llangelynin
- Llangywer
- Llanllechid
- Llanllyfni
- Llannor
- Llanrug
- Llanuwchllyn
- Llanwnda
- Llanycil
- Llanystumdwy
- Maentwrog
- Mawddwy
- Nefyn
- Pennal
- Penrhyndeudraeth
- Pentir
- Pistyll
- Porthmadog
- Pwllheli
- Rachub
- Talsarnau
- Trawsfynydd
- Tudweiliog
- Tywyn
- Waunfawr
- Y Felinheli

== Regions ==
- Llŷn Peninsula
- Northern Snowdonia (Snowdonia proper)
- Southern Snowdonia (the southern part of the Snowdonia National Park)

== See also ==
- List of places in Gwynedd for all villages, towns and cities in Gwynedd.
