= 2017 Gwynedd Council election =

Local election held for Gwynedd Council in Wales

- 4 May 2017

All 75 seats in Gwynedd Council 38 seats needed for a majority
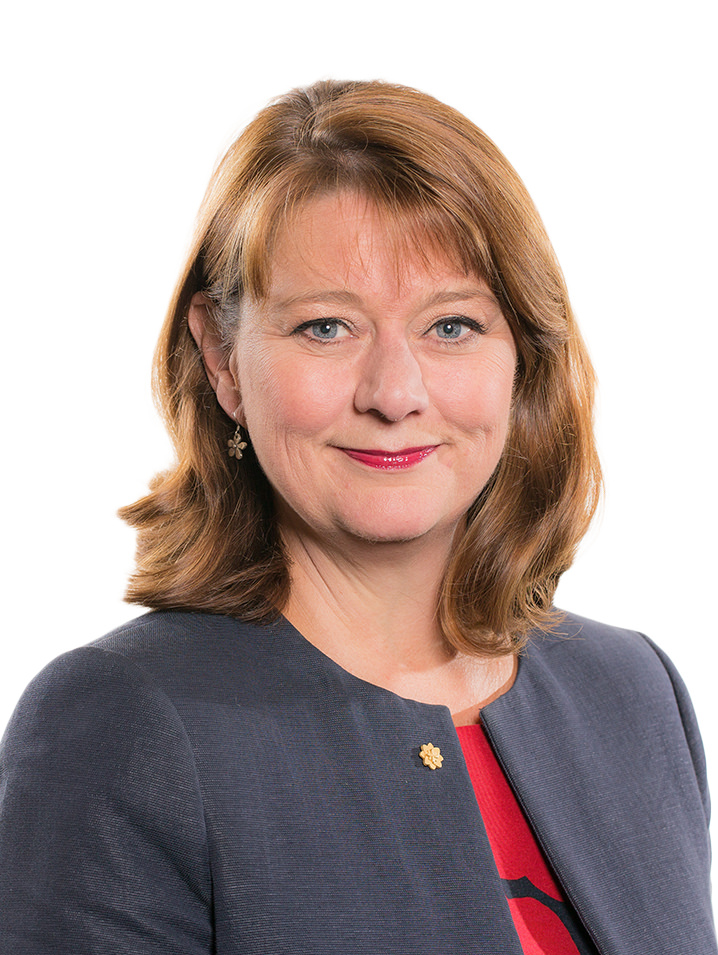

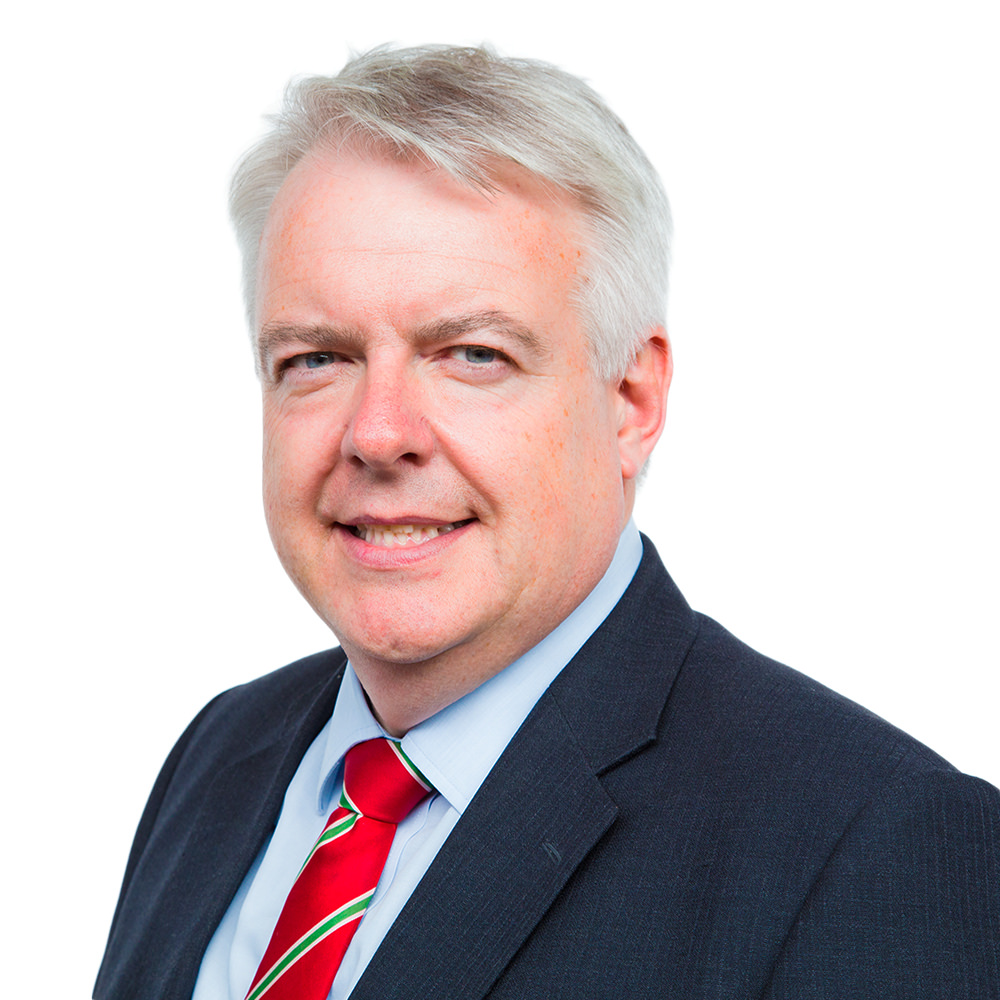

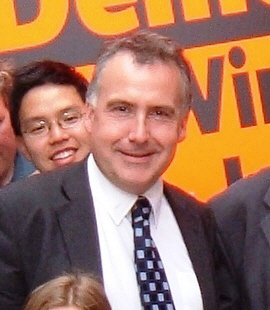
	First party	Second party	Third party
		Ind	LLG
Leader	Leanne Wood	None	Owain Williams
Party	Plaid Cymru	Independent	Llais Gwynedd
Last election	37 seats, 43.4%	19 seats, 19.4%	13 seats, 23.7%
Seats won	41	26	6
Seat Change	▲4	▲7	▼7
Percentage	39%	39%	12%
Swing	▼4.4%	▲19.6%	▼11.7%
	Fourth party	Fifth party
Leader	Carwyn Jones	Mark Williams
Party	Labour	Liberal Democrats
Last election	4 seats, 9.8%	2 seats, 1.9%
Seats won	1	1
Seat Change	▼3	▼1
Percentage	8%	2%
Swing	▼1.8%	▲0.1%
- 2017 local election results in Gwynedd.
Council control before election
Plaid Cymru
Council control after election
Plaid Cymru

The 2017 Gwynedd Council election took place on 4 May 2017 to elect members of Gwynedd Council in Wales. Seventy five council seats were up for re-election. In twenty one seats, the candidates were elected unopposed.

The Gwynedd election was on the same day as other 2017 Welsh local elections.

The May 2017 election in the Hendre ward resulted in a "historic" tie, with the Plaid Cymru and Independent candidates each winning 132 votes. The Independent candidate was declared the winner after a name was drawn from a pot by the returning officer.

== Election results ==
Plaid Cymru held control of the council, with over half of the total seats, as per the table below:

Gwynedd Council election 2017
Party	Seats	Gains	Losses	Net gain/loss	Seats %	Votes %	Votes	+/−
Plaid Cymru	41			▲3	54.7	39		▼4.4
Independent	26			▲7	34.7	39		▲19.6
Llais Gwynedd	6			▼7	8.0	12		▼11.7
Labour	1			▼6	1.3	8	2,096	▼1.8
Liberal Democrats	1			▼1	1.3	2	654	▲0.1
Conservative	0	Steady	Steady	Steady	0.0		122	
Socialist Labour	0	Steady	Steady	Steady	0.0		97	
UKIP	0	Steady	Steady	Steady	0.0		24	

== Council Composition ==
=== After the election ===
↓
41	26	6	1	1
Plaid Cymru	Independent	Llais Gwynedd	Lab	Lib

Lab – Labour
Lib – Liberal Democrats

== Ward results ==
=== Aberdaron ===
Aberdaron 2017 (1)
Party	Candidate	Votes	%	±%
Plaid Cymru	W. Gareth Roberts	233	52%	
Llais Gwynedd	Dafydd Williams	215	48%	
Majority		18	2%	
Turnout		448	63%	

=== Aberdyfi ===
Aberdyfi 2017 (1)
Party	Candidate	Votes	%	±%
Independent	Dewi Owen	Unopposed		

=== Abererch ===
Abererch 2017 (1)
Party	Candidate	Votes	%	±%
Plaid Cymru	Peter Read	Unopposed		

=== Abermaw ===
Abermaw 2017 (1)
Party	Candidate	Votes	%	±%
Plaid Cymru	Gethin Williams	412	72%	
Labour	Graham Hogg	161	28%	
Majority		251	44%	
Turnout		573	38%	

=== Abersoch ===
Abersoch 2017 (1)
Party	Candidate	Votes	%	±%
Independent	Dewi Roberts	206	67%	
Independent	John Gosling	69	22%	
Llais Gwynedd	Sally Jones	17	6%	
Conservative	Bernard Gentry	15	5%	
Majority		137	45%	
Turnout		307	59%	

=== Arllechwedd ===
Arllechwedd 2017 (1)
Party	Candidate	Votes	%	±%
Plaid Cymru	Dafydd Meurig	Unopposed		

=== Bethel ===
Bethel 2017 (1)
Party	Candidate	Votes	%	±%
Labour	Sion Jones	514	73%	
Plaid Cymru	Gareth Griffiths	191	27%	
Majority		323	46%	
Turnout		705	70%	

=== Bontnewydd ===
Bontnewydd 2017 (1)
Party	Candidate	Votes	%	±%
Independent	Peter Garlick	361	62%	
Plaid Cymru	Wynn Roberts	191	33%	
Llais Gwynedd	Gavin Owen	31	5%	
Majority		170	29%	
Turnout		583	69%	

=== Botwnnog ===
Botwnnog 2017 (1)
Party	Candidate	Votes	%	±%
Llais Gwynedd	Gareth Williams	203	41%	
Independent	Glyn Roberts	123	25%	
Independent	Sian Parri	105	21%	
Plaid Cymru	Sioned Roberts	63	13%	
Majority		80	16%	
Turnout		494	67%	

=== Bowydd and Rhiw ===
Bowydd and Rhiw 2017 (1)
Party	Candidate	Votes	%	±%
Plaid Cymru	Annwen Daniels	307	69%	
Llais Gwynedd	Mark Thomas	138	31%	
Majority		169	38%	
Turnout		445	29%	

=== Brithdir and Llanfachreth / Y Ganllwyd / Llanelltyd ===
Brithdir and Llanfachreth / Y Ganllwyd / Llanelltyd 2017 (1)
Party	Candidate	Votes	%	±%
Plaid Cymru	Peredur Jenkins	Unopposed		

=== Bryncrug / Llanfihangel ===
Bryncrug / Llanfihangel 2017 (1)
Party	Candidate	Votes	%	±%
Independent	Beth Lawton	284	78%	
Independent	Royston Hammond	81	21%	
Majority		203	57%	
Turnout		365	48%	

=== Cadnant (Caernarfon) ===
Cadnant (Caernarfon) 2017 (1)
Party	Candidate	Votes	%	±%
Plaid Cymru	Cemlyn Williams	263	38%	
Labour	Glyn Thomas	259	38%	
Independent	Maria Sarnacki	167	24%	
Majority		4	0%	
Turnout		689	46%	

=== Clynnog ===
Clynnog 2017 (1)
Party	Candidate	Votes	%	±%
Llais Gwynedd	Owain Williams	179	40%	
Independent	Dafydd Davies	171	38%	
Plaid Cymru	Heulwen Jones	102	23%	
Majority		8	2%	
Turnout		452	63%	

=== Corris/Mawddwy ===
Corris/Mawddwy 2017 (1)
Party	Candidate	Votes	%	±%
Independent	John Roberts	Unopposed		

=== Criccieth ===
Criccieth 2017 (1)
Party	Candidate	Votes	%	±%
Independent	Eirwyn Williams	470	69%	
Plaid Cymru	Mici Plwm	168	25%	
Liberal Democrats	William Andrews	46	7%	
Majority		302	67%	
Turnout		684	53%	

=== Cwm y Glo ===
Cwm y Glo 2017 (1)
Party	Candidate	Votes	%	±%
Plaid Cymru	Berwyn Jones	231	68%	
Labour	Martin Jones	110	32%	
Majority		121	36%	
Turnout		341	46%	

=== Deiniol (Bangor) ===
Deiniol (Bangor) 2017 (1)
Party	Candidate	Votes	%	±%
Plaid Cymru	Steve Collings	74	40%	
Independent	Enid Jones	41	22%	
Labour	Kerry Kieran	41	22%	
Liberal Democrats	Mohammed Shultan	31	17%	
Majority		33	18%	
Turnout		187	30%	

=== Deiniolen ===
Deiniolen 2017 (1)
Party	Candidate	Votes	%	±%
Plaid Cymru	Elfed Williams	Unopposed		

=== Dewi (Bangor) ===
Dewi (Bangor) 2017 (1)
Party	Candidate	Votes	%	±%
Plaid Cymru	Gareth Roberts	266	55%	
Independent	Colin King	220	45%	
Majority		46	10%	
Turnout		486	40%	

=== Diffwys and Maenofferen ===
Diffwys and Maenofferen 2017 (1)
Party	Candidate	Votes	%	±%
Llais Gwynedd	Robert Daniels	185	50%	
Plaid Cymru	Mandy Williams-Davies	182	50%	
Majority		3	0%	
Turnout		367	50%	

=== Dolbenmaen ===
Dolbenmaen 2017 (1)
Party	Candidate	Votes	%	±%
Liberal Democrats	Stephen Churchman	447	81%	
Plaid Cymru	Caroll Ann Morris	107	19%	
Majority		340	62%	
Turnout		554	61%	

=== Dolgellau (North) ===
Dolgellau (North) 2017 (1)
Party	Candidate	Votes	%	±%
Plaid Cymru	Dyfrig Siencyn	228	54%	
Independent	Delwyn Evans	192	46%	
Majority		36	8%	
Turnout		420	47%	

=== Dolgellau (South) ===
Dolgellau (South) 2017 (1)
Party	Candidate	Votes	%	±%
Plaid Cymru	Linda Morgan	301	59%	
Independent	John Raghoobar	206	41%	
Majority		95	18%	
Turnout		507	49%	

=== Dyffryn Ardudwy ===
Dyffryn Ardudwy (South) 2017 (1)
Party	Candidate	Votes	%	±%
Independent	Eryl Jones-Williams	324	50%	
Plaid Cymru	Thomas Jones	286	44%	
Labour	Anne Bennett	39	6%	
Majority		38	6%	
Turnout		649	55%	

=== Efailnewydd / Buan ===
Efailnewydd / Buan 2017 (1)
Party	Candidate	Votes	%	±%
Llais Gwynedd	Anwen Davies	385	72%	
Plaid Cymru	Gweno Glyn	152	28%	
Majority		233	44%	
Turnout		537	54%	

=== Garth (Bangor) ===
Garth (Bangor) 2017 (1)
Party	Candidate	Votes	%	±%
Plaid Cymru	Huw Gruffydd Wyn Jones	136	56%	
Independent	Lesley Day	107	44%	
Majority		29	12%	
Turnout		243	47%	

=== Gerlan ===
Gerlan 2017 (1)
Party	Candidate	Votes	%	±%
Plaid Cymru	Paul Rowlinson	439	54%	
Independent	Chris O'Marah	273	34%	
Socialist Labour	Kathrine Jones	94	12%	
Majority		166	20%	
Turnout		806	50%	

=== Glyder (Bangor) ===
Glyder (Bangor) 2017 (1)
Party	Candidate	Votes	%	±%
Plaid Cymru	Elin Jones	Unopposed		

=== Groeslon ===
Groeslon 2017 (1)
Party	Candidate	Votes	%	±%
Independent	Eric Jones	564	66%	
Plaid Cymru	Rhun Dafydd	241	28%	
Labour	Emyr Rhys	46	5%	
Majority		323	38%	
Turnout		851	65%	

=== Harlech/Talsarnau ===
Harlech/Talsarnau 2017 (1)
Party	Candidate	Votes	%	±%
Independent	Freya Bentham	297	39%	
Plaid Cymru	E. Caerwyn Roberts	292	39%	
Conservative	Jordan Edwards	70	9%	
Labour	Ross Lloyd	70	9%	
UKIP	James Turner	24	3%	
Majority		5	0%	
Turnout		753	51%	

=== Hendre (Bangor) ===
Hendre (Bangor) 2017 (1)
Party	Candidate	Votes	%	±%
Independent	Richard Hughes	133	41%	
Plaid Cymru	John Wynn Jones	132	41%	
Labour	Ade Sharratt	59	18%	
Majority		1	0%	
Turnout		324	36%	

=== Hirael (Bangor) ===
Hirael (Bangor) 2017 (1)
Party	Candidate	Votes	%	±%
Independent	Keith Jones	216	51%	
Labour	Luke Tugwell	102	24%	
Plaid Cymru	Dyfrig Jones	69	16%	
Conservative	David Hibbert	37	9%	
Majority		114	27%	
Turnout		424	43%	

=== Llanaelhaearn ===
Llanaelhaearn 2017 (1)
Party	Candidate	Votes	%	±%
Plaid Cymru	Aled Wyn Jones	318	61%	
Llais Gwynedd	Doran Williams	206	39%	
Majority		112	22%	
Turnout		524	46%	

=== Llanbedr ===
Llanbedr 2017 (1)
Party	Candidate	Votes	%	±%
Plaid Cymru	Annwen Hughes	303	77%	
Labour	Olga Jean Thomas	88	23%	
Majority		215	54%	
Turnout		391	50%	

=== Llanbedrog ===
Llanbedrog 2017 (1)
Party	Candidate	Votes	%	±%
Independent	Angela Russell	Unopposed		

=== Llanberis ===
Llanberis 2017 (1)
Party	Candidate	Votes	%	±%
Independent	Kevin Jones	519	58%	
Plaid Cymru	Emlyn Charles Baylis	371	42%	
Majority		148	16%	
Turnout		890	58%	

=== Llandderfel ===
Llandderfel 2017 (1)
Party	Candidate	Votes	%	±%
Plaid Cymru	Elwyn Edwards	Unopposed		

=== Llanengan ===
Llanengan 2017 (1)
Party	Candidate	Votes	%	±%
Independent	John Hughes	235	59%	
Plaid Cymru	Owen Roberts	161	41%	
Majority		74	18%	
Turnout		396	48%	

=== Llangelynnin ===
Llangelynnin 2017 (1)
Party	Candidate	Votes	%	±%
Independent	Louise Hughes	Unopposed		

=== Llanllyfni ===
Llanllyfni 2017 (1)
Party	Candidate	Votes	%	±%
Plaid Cymru	Craig ab Iago	245	53%	
Llais Gwynedd	Robert Hughes	220	47%	
Majority		25	6%	
Turnout		465	52%	

=== Llanrug ===
Llanrug 2017 (1)
Party	Candidate	Votes	%	±%
Plaid Cymru	Charles Wyn Jones	Unopposed		

=== Llanuwchllyn ===
Llanuwchllyn 2017 (1)
Party	Candidate	Votes	%	±%
Plaid Cymru	Alan Jones Evans	Unopposed		

=== Llanwnda ===
Llanwnda 2017 (1)
Party	Candidate	Votes	%	±%
Llais Gwynedd	Aeron Jones	481	62%	
Plaid Cymru	Huw Llwyd Rowlands	295	38%	
Majority		186	24%	
Turnout		776	54%	

=== Llanystumdwy ===
Llanystumdwy 2017 (1)
Party	Candidate	Votes	%	±%
Plaid Cymru	Aled Evans	Unopposed		

=== Marchog (Bangor) ===
Marchog (Bangor) 2017 (2)
Party	Candidate	Votes	%	±%
Independent	Nigel Pickavance	376	38%	
Independent	Dylan Fernley	257	26%	
Labour	Derek Hainge	156	16%	
Independent	Christopher O'Neal	98	10%	
Plaid Cymru	Cadi Llywelyn	65	7%	
Plaid Cymru	Conor Savage	42	4%	
Majority			%	
Turnout		994	33%	

=== Menai (Bangor) ===
Menai (Bangor) 2017 (2)
Party	Candidate	Votes	%	±%
Plaid Cymru	Mair Rowlands	218	45%	
Plaid Cymru	Catrin Wager	175	36%	
Liberal Democrats	Andrew Joyce	91	19%	
Majority			%	
Turnout		484	25%	

=== Menai (Caernarfon) ===
Menai (Caernarfon) 2017 (1)
Party	Candidate	Votes	%	±%
Plaid Cymru	Ioan Thomas	568	55%	
Independent	Gwyndaf Jones	462	45%	
Majority		106	10%	
Turnout		1,030	58.8%	

=== Morfa Nefyn ===
Morfa Nefyn 2017 (1)
Party	Candidate	Votes	%	±%
Plaid Cymru	Sian Wyn Hughes	332	66%	
Llais Gwynedd	Gareth Wyn Jones	173	34%	
Majority		159	32%	
Turnout		505	56%	

=== Nefyn ===
Nefyn 2017 (1)
Party	Candidate	Votes	%	±%
Plaid Cymru	Gruffydd Williams	Unopposed		

=== Ogwen ===
Ogwen 2017 (1)
Party	Candidate	Votes	%	±%
Plaid Cymru	Rheinallt Puw	355	44%	
Independent	Stephen Jones	279	35%	
Labour	Susan Davies	127	16%	
Liberal Democrats	Calum Davies	39	5%	
Socialist Labour	Teresa Roberts	3	0%	
Majority		76	9%	
Turnout		803	49%	

=== Peblig (Caernarfon) ===
Peblig (Caernarfon) 2017 (1)
Party	Candidate	Votes	%	±%
Independent	Jason Parry	311	50%	
Plaid Cymru	W. Tudor Owen	308	50%	
Majority		3	0%	
Turnout		619	44%	

=== Penisarwaun ===
Penisarwaun 2017 (1)
Party	Candidate	Votes	%	±%
Independent	Elwyn Jones	335	51%	
Plaid Cymru	R. Hefin Williams	320	49%	
Majority		15	2%	
Turnout		655	49.3%	

=== Penrhyndeudraeth ===
Penrhyndeudraeth 2017 (1)
Party	Candidate	Votes	%	±%
Plaid Cymru	Gareth Thomas	Unopposed		

=== Pentir ===
Pentir 2017 (1)
Party	Candidate	Votes	%	±%
Plaid Cymru	Menna Baines	Unopposed		

=== Penygroes ===
Penygroes 2017 (1)
Party	Candidate	Votes	%	±%
Plaid Cymru	Judith Humphreys	512	71%	
Llais Gwynedd	Hugh Edwards	206	29%	
Majority		306	42%	
Turnout		718	54%	

=== Porthmadog (East) ===
Porthmadog (East) 2017 (1)
Party	Candidate	Votes	%	±%
Plaid Cymru	Nia Jeffreys	379	56%	
Llais Gwynedd	Jason Humphreys	296	44%	
Majority		83	12%	
Turnout		675	58%	

=== Porthmadog (West) ===
Porthmadog (West) 2017 (1)
Party	Candidate	Votes	%	±%
Plaid Cymru	E. Selwyn Griffiths	Unopposed		

=== Porthmadog - Tremadog ===
Porthmadog - Tremadog 2017 (1)
Party	Candidate	Votes	%	±%
Llais Gwynedd	Alwyn Gruffydd	296	56%	
Plaid Cymru	Margaret Jones	233	44%	
Majority		63	12%	
Turnout		949	56%	

=== Pwllheli (North) ===
Pwllheli (North) 2017 (1)
Party	Candidate	Votes	%	±%
Independent	Dylan Bullard	420	56%	
Plaid Cymru	Michael Owen	330	44%	
Majority		90	12%	
Turnout		750	50%	

=== Pwllheli (South) ===
Pwllheli (South) 2017 (1)
Party	Candidate	Votes	%	±%
Independent	Hefin Underwood	555	77%	
Plaid Cymru	Elin Hywel	167	23%	
Majority		388	54%	
Turnout		722	56%	

=== Seiont (Caernarfon) ===
Seiont (Caernarfon) 2017 (2)
Party	Candidate	Votes	%	±%
Independent	W. Roy Owen	563	51	
Plaid Cymru	Olaf Larsen	282	25	
Labour	Gareth Parry	261	24	
Llais Gwynedd	Endaf Cooke	251	23	
Plaid Cymru	Glyn Tomos	248	22	
Independent	Keith Jones	217	20	
Independent	Arfon Jones	176	16	
Majority			%	
Turnout		1,106	47%	

=== Talysarn ===
Talysarn 2017 (1)
Party	Candidate	Votes	%	±%
Independent	I. Dilwyn Lloyd	377	60%	
Plaid Cymru	David Jones	256	40%	
Majority		121	20%	
Turnout		633	48%	

=== Teigl ===
Teigl 2017 (1)
Party	Candidate	Votes	%	±%
Plaid Cymru	Linda Jones	Unopposed		

=== Trawsfynydd ===
Trawsfynydd 2017 (1)
Party	Candidate	Votes	%	±%
Independent	Elfed Roberts	241	37%	
Plaid Cymru	Bryn Jones	214	33%	
Independent	Lynda Massarelli	199	30%	
Majority		27	4%	
Turnout		654	39%	

=== Tregarth a Mynydd Llandygai ===
Tregarth a Mynydd Llandygai 2017 (1)
Party	Candidate	Votes	%	±%
Plaid Cymru	Dafydd Owen	Unopposed		

=== Tudweiliog ===
Tudweiliog 2017 (1)
Party	Candidate	Votes	%	±%
Plaid Cymru	Simon Glyn	176	56%	
Llais Gwynedd	Lina Jones	140	44%	
Majority		36	12%	
Turnout		316	48%	

=== Tywyn ===
Tywyn 2017 (2)
Party	Candidate	Votes	%	±%
Independent	Anne Jones	599	45	
Independent	Mike Stevens	550	41	
Independent	John Pughe	455	34	
Labour	Quentin Deakin	322	24	
Majority			%	
Turnout		1,326	80.4%	

=== Waunfawr ===
Waunfawr 2017 (1)
Party	Candidate	Votes	%	±%
Plaid Cymru	Edgar Wyn Owen	349	55%	
Independent	Cain Thomas	286	45%	
Majority		63	10%	
Turnout		635	51%	

=== Y Bala ===
Y Bala 2017 (1)
Party	Candidate	Votes	%	±%
Plaid Cymru	Dilwyn Morgan	Unopposed		

=== Y Felinheli ===
Y Felinheli 2017 (1)
Party	Candidate	Votes	%	±%
Plaid Cymru	Gareth Wyn Griffith	Unopposed		
