= List of electoral wards in Gwynedd =

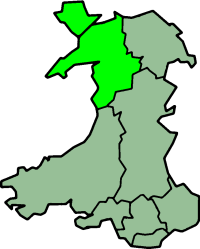
County of Gwynedd from 1974

This list of electoral wards in Gwynedd includes council wards which elect (or have elected) councillors to the local authorities in the county of Gwynedd, Wales.

Gwynedd was created with the merger of Anglesey with Caernarfonshire and Merionethshire in 1974, led by Gwynedd County Council. In 1996 Anglesey became a separate county and the District of Aberconwy passed to Conwy County Borough, The new Gwynedd local authority renamed itself Gwynedd Council.

Between 2004 and 2022 there were 71 county wards returning 75 county councillors to Gwynedd Council. From 2022 there have been 65 wards electing 69 county councillors.

== Wards of Gwynedd County Council ==
=== 1973–1989 ===
From the 1973 county election there were 64 wards, all except two of them elected one county councillor to the new Gwynedd County Council. The Bangor No.1 and the Ogwen wards elected two councillors.

=== 1989–1996 ===
Following The County of Gwynedd (Electoral Arrangements) Order 1988 the number of wards were decreased to 62, each electing one county councillor to Gwynedd County Council, taking effect from the May 1989 elections.

In Borough of Aberconwy

- Bro Machno
- Caerhun
- Conwy
- Craig-y-Don
- Deganwy
- Gogarth
- Llanfairfechan
- Llanrwst
- Llansanffraid
- Marl
- Mostyn
- Penmaenmawr
- Penrhyn
- Tudno

In Borough of Arfon

- Bangor
- Bethesda
- Caernarfon
- Dewi
- Dyffryn Nantlle
- Gwyrfai
- Llanddeiniolen
- Llandwrog
- Llandygai
- Marchog
- Padarn
- Peblig
- Pentir

In District of Dwyfor

- Criccieth
- Dolbenmaen
- Llanengan
- Llannor
- Porthmadog
- Nefyn
- Pwllheli
- Tudweiliog

In District of Meirionnydd

- Bala
- Barmouth
- Conglywal and Maenofferen
- Corris
- Dolgellau
- Ffestiniog
- Harlech
- Penrhyndeudraeth
- Tywyn

In Ynys Mon-Isle of Anglesey

- Aberffraw
- Aethwy
- Amlwch
- Beaumaris
- Bro-y-Llynoed
- Cwm Cadnant
- Dulas
- Holyhead
- Llanbadrig
- Llanfair-Mathafarn-Eithaf
- Llangefni
- Llannerch-y-medd
- Maeshyfryd
- Menai
- Menai Bridge
- Porthyfelin
- Trearddur
- Valley

== Wards of Gwynedd Council ==
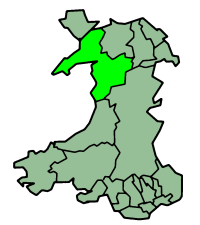
County of Gwynedd from 1996

=== 1995–2004 ===
The first elections to the new Gwynedd Council took place in 1995. Eighty three county councillors were elected from sixty nine electoral wards. as follows (numbers of councillors in brackets):

- Aberdaron (1)
- Aberdovey (1)
- Abererch (1)
- Abermaw (1)
- Abersoch (1)
- Arthog (1)
- Bala (1)
- Bethel (1)
- Bontnewydd (1)
- Botwnnog (1)
- Bowydd & Rhiw (1)
- Cadnant (1)
- Clynnog (1)
- Conglywal & Maenofferen (2)
- Corris/Mawddwy (1)
- Criccieth (1)
- Cynfal & Teigl (1)
- Deiniol (1)
- Deiniolen (1)
- Dewi (1)
- Dolbenmaen/Beddgelert (1)
- Dolgellau/Llanelltyd/Brithdir & Llanfachre (3)
- Dyffryn Ardudwy (2)
- Efail-Newydd/Buan (1)
- Garth (1)
- Gerlan (1)
- Glyder (1)
- Harlech (1)
- Hendre (1)
- Hirael (1)
- Llanaelhaearn (1)
- Llanarmon/Llanystumdwy (1)
- Llanbedr (1)
- Llanbedrog (1)
- Llanberis (1)
- Llandderfel (1)
- Llandwrog (2)
- Llandygai (2)
- Llanengan (1)
- Llangelynin/Bryncrug (1)
- Llanllechid/Aber (1)
- Llanllyfni (1)
- Llanrug (2)
- Llanuwchllyn (1)
- Llanwnda (1)
- Marchog (2)
- Menai (2)
- Menai (2)
- Nefyn (2)
- Ogwen (1)
- Peblig (1)
- Penisarwaun (1)
- Penrhyndeudraeth (2)
- Pentir (2)
- Penygroes (1)
- Porthmadog East (Dwyrain) (1)
- Porthmadog West (Gorllewin) (1)
- Porthmadog-Gest (1)
- Porthmadog-Tremadog (1)
- Pwllheli North (Gogledd) (1)
- Pwllheli South (De) (1)
- Rachub (1)
- Seiont (2)
- Talysarn (1)
- Trawsfynydd (1)
- Tudweilog (1)
- Tywyn (2)
- Waunfawr (1)
- Y Felinheli (1)

=== 2004–2022 ===
County wards of Gwynedd from 2004 to 2022

Following The County of Gwynedd (Electoral Changes) Order 2002 the number of wards were increased to 71, electing 75 councillors, taking effect from the 2004 elections. Forty-five wards remained unchanged, eight wards had their boundaries amended and a further four had their representation reduced from two councillors to one. Most communities in the county also have a community council and community wards.

Ward	County Coun cillors	Communities (and community wards) included
Aberdaron	1	Aberdaron*
Aberdovey	1	Aberdovey*; Pennal*
Abererch	1	Llannor* (Abererch and Y Ffôr wards)
Abersoch	1	Llanengan* (Abersoch ward) )
Arllechwedd	1	Aber and Llanllechid*; Llandygai* (Llandygai ward)
Bala	1	Bala (town)*
Barmouth	1	Barmouth (town)*
Bethel	1	Llanddeiniolen* (Bethel ward)
Bontnewydd	1	Bontnewydd*
Botwnnog	1	Botwnnog*
Bowydd and Rhiw	1	Ffestiniog* (Bowydd and Rhiw and Tanygrisiau wards)
Brithdir and Llanfachreth/Y Ganllwyd/Llanelltyd	1	Brithdir and Llanfachreth*; Ganllwyd*; Llanelltyd*
Bryncrug/Llanfihangel	1	Bryn-crug*; Llanfihangel-y-Pennant*
Cadnant	1	Caernarfon (town)* (Dwyrain ward)
Clynnog Fawr	1	Clynnog*
Corris/Mawddwy	1	Corris*; Mawddwy*
Criccieth	1	Criccieth*
Cwm y Glo	1	Llanrug* (Ceunant and Cwm y Glo wards)
Deiniol	1	Bangor (city)* (Deiniol ward)
Deiniolen	1	Llanddeiniolen* (Clwt y Bont, Deiniolen and Dinorwig wards)
Dewi	1	Bangor (city)* (Dewi ward)
Diffwys and Maenofferen	1	Ffestiniog* (Diffwys and Maenofferen ward)
Dolbenmaen	1	Dolbenmaen* (Bryncir, Garn, Golan, Penmorfa and Treflys wards)
Dolgellau North	1	Dolgellau (town)* (Northern and Rural wards)
Dolgellau South	1	Dolgellau (town)* (Southern wards)
Dyffryn Ardudwy	1	Dyffryn Ardudwy*
Efailnewydd/Buan	1	Buan*; Llannor* (Efail-newydd and Pentre-uchaf wards)
Garth	1	Bangor (city)* (Garth Ward)
Gerlan	1	Bethesda (town)* (Gerlan and Rachub wards)
Glyder	1	Bangor (city)* (Glyder ward)
Groeslon	1	Llandwrog* (Dinas Dinlle and Groeslon wards)
Harlech and Talsarnau	1	Harlech*; Talsarnau*
Hendre	1	Bangor (city)* (Hendre ward)
Hirael	1	Bangor (city)* (Hirael ward)
Llanaelhaearn	1	Llanaelhaearn*; Pistyll*
Llanbedr	1	Llanbedr*; Llanfair*
Llanbedrog	1	Llanbedrog*
Llanberis	1	Llanberis*
Llandderfel	1	Llandderfel*; Llanycil*
Llanengan	1	Llanengan* (Llanengan and Llangian wards)
Llangelynin	1	Arthog*; Llanegryn*; Llangelynin*
Llanllyfni	1	Llanllyfni* (Llanllyfni, Nantlle and Nebo wards)
Llanrug	1	Llanrug* (Llanrug ward)
Llanwchllyn	1	Llanwchllyn*; Llangywer*
Llanwnda	1	Llanwnda*
Llanystumdwy	1	Llanystumdwy*
Marchog	2	Bangor (city)* (Marchog ward)
Menai (Bangor)	2	Bangor (city)* (Menai ward )
Menai (Caernarfon)	1	Caernarfon (town)* (Menai ward)
Morfa Nefyn	1	Nefyn (town)* (Edern and Morfa Nefyn wards)
Nefyn	1	Nefyn (town)* (Nefyn ward)
Ogwen	1	Bethesda* (Ogwen ward)
Peblig	1	Caernarfon (town)* (Deheuol ward)
Penisarwaun	1	Llanddeiniolen* (Brynrefail, Penisarwaun and Rhiwlas wards)
Penrhyndeudraeth	1	Llanfrothen*; Penrhyndeudraeth*
Pentir	1	Pentir*
Penygroes	1	Llanllyfni* (Penygroes ward)
Porthmadog East	1	Porthmadog (town)* (East and Ynys Galch wards)
Porthmadog West	1	Porthmadog (town)* (Gest, Morfa Bychan and West wards)
Porthmadog - Tremadog	1	Beddgelert*; Dolbenmaen* (Prenteg ward); Porthmadog (town)* (Tremadog ward)
Pwllheli North	1	Pwllheli (town)* (North ward)
Pwllheli South	1	Pwllheli (town)* (South ward)
Seiont	2	Caernarfon (town)* (Gorllewin ward)
Talysarn	1	Llandwrog* (Carmel and Cesarea wards); Llanllyfni* (Talysarn ward)
Teigl	1	Ffestiniog* (Conglywal and Cynfal and Teigl wards)
Trawsfynydd	1	Maentwrog*; Trawsfynydd*
Tregarth and Mynydd Llandygai	1	Llandygai* (St Ann's and Tregarth wards)
Tudweiliog	1	Tudweiliog*
Tywyn	2	Tywyn (town)*
Waunfawr	1	Betws Garmon*; Waunfawr
Y Felinheli	1	Y Felinheli*

* = Communities which elect a community council

=== 2022– ===
Following a boundary review and The County of Gwynedd (Electoral Arrangements) Order 2021 the number of wards was reduced to 65, electing 69 councillors, taking effect from the 2022 elections. All wards now use the Welsh name as the official name in Welsh and English. Twenty-seven wards remained unchanged.

Ward	County Coun cillors	Communities (and community wards) included
Aberdyfi	1	Aberdyfi*; Pennal*
Abererch	1	Llannor* (Abererch and Y Ffôr wards)
Abermaw	1	Barmouth*
Abersoch gyda Llanengan	1	Llanengan* (Abersoch and Llanengan wards)
Arllechwedd	1	Aber and Llanllechid*; Llandygai* (Llandygai ward); Pentir (Glasinfryn ward)
Bethel a’r Felinheli	2	Y Felinheli*; Llanddeiniolen* (Bethel ward)
Bowydd a’r Rhiw	1	Ffestiniog* (Bowydd and Rhiw and Tanygrisiau wards)
Brithdir and Llanfachreth/Y Ganllwyd/Llanelltyd	1	Brithdir and Llanfachreth*; Ganllwyd*; Llanelltyd*
Bro Dysynni	1	Bryn-crug*; Llanegryn*; Llanfihangel-y-Pennant*
Cadnant	1	Caernarfon* (Cadnant ward)
Canol Bangor	2	Bangor* (Garth, Hendre and Menai wards)
Canol Bethesda	1	Bethesda* (Ogwen ward)
Canol Tref Caernarfon	1	Caernarfon* (Canol Tref ward)
Clynnog Fawr	1	Clynnog*; Llanllyfni* (Nebo ward)
Corris a Mawddwy	1	Corris*; Mawddwy*
Cricieth	1	Criccieth*
Cwm y Glo	1	Llanddeiniolen* (Brynrefail ward); Llanrug* (Ceunant and Cwm y Glo wards)
De Dolgellau	1	Dolgellau* (Southern ward)
De Pwllheli	1	Pwllheli* (South ward)
Deiniolen	1	Llanddeiniolen* (Clwt y Bont, Deiniolen and Dinorwig wards)
Dewi	1	Bangor* (Dewi ward)
Diffwys and Maenofferen	1	Ffestiniog* (Diffwys and Maenofferen ward)
Dolbenmaen	1	Dolbenmaen* (Bryncir, Garn, Golan, Penmorfa and Treflys wards)
Dwyrain Bangor	2	Bangor* (Hirael and Marchog wards)
Dwyrain Porthmadog	1	Porthmadog* (East and Ynys Galch wards)
Dyffryn Ardudwy	1	Dyffryn Ardudwy*
Efailnewydd a Buan	1	Buan*; Llannor* (Efail-newydd and Pentre-uchaf wards)
Gerlan	1	Bethesda* (Gerlan and Rachub wards)
Glaslyn	1	Beddgelert*; Llanfrothen*; Dolbenmaen* (Pren-teg ward); Porthmadog* (Tremadog ward)
Glyder	1	Bangor* (Glyder ward)
Gogledd Dolgellau	1	Dolgellau* (Northern ward)
Gogledd Pwllheli	1	Pwllheli* (North ward)
Gorllewin Porthmadog	1	Porthmadog* (Gest, Morfa Bychan and West wards)
Gorllewin Tywyn	1	Tywyn* (East and West wards)
Harlech a Llanbedr	2	Harlech*; Llanbedr*; Llanfair*; Talsarnau*
Llanbedrog gyda Mynytho	1	Llanbedrog*; Llanengan* (Llangian ward)
Llanberis	1	Llanberis*
Llandderfel	1	Llandderfel*; Llangywer*
Llangelynin	1	Arthog*; Llanegryn*; Llangelynin*
Llanllyfni	1	Llanllyfni* (Llanllyfni, Nantlle and Talysarn wards)
Llanrug	1	Llanrug* (Llanrug ward)
Llanwchllyn	1	Llanwchllyn*; Llanycil*
Llanwnda	1	Llanwnda* (Dinas and Rhostryfan wards)
Llanystumdwy	1	Llanystumdwy*
Menai (Caernarfon)	1	Caernarfon* (Menai ward)
Morfa Nefyn a Thudweiliog	1	Nefyn* (Edern and Morfa Nefyn wards); Tudweiliog*
Morfa Tywyn	1	Tywyn* (Morfa ward)
Nefyn	1	Nefyn (town)* (Nefyn ward)
Peblig	1	Caernarfon* (Deheuol ward)
Pen draw Llŷn	1	Aberdaron*; Botwnnog*
Penisa’r-waun	1	Llanddeiniolen* (Penisarwaun and Rhiwlas wards)
Penrhyndeudraeth	1	Penrhyndeudraeth*
Pen-y-groes	1	Llanllyfni* (Penygroes ward)
Teigl	1	Ffestiniog* (Conglywal and Cynfal and Teigl wards)
Trawsfynydd	1	Maentwrog*; Trawsfynydd*
Tre-garth a Mynydd Llandygái	1	Llandygai* (St Ann's and Tregarth wards)
Tryfan	1	Llandwrog* (Carmel and Cesarea wards); Llanwnda* (Rhosgadfan ward)
Waunfawr	1	Betws Garmon*; Waunfawr (Waunfawr ward)
Y Bala	1	Bala*
Y Bontnewydd	1	Bontnewydd*; Waunfawr (Caeathro ward)
Y Faenol	1	Pentir* (Vaynol ward)
Y Groeslon	1	Llandwrog* (Dinas Dinlle and Groeslon wards)
Yr Eifl	1	Llanaelhaearn*; Pistyll*

* = Communities which elect a community council

== See also ==
- List of electoral wards in Wales
