= 2022 Gwynedd Council election =

Local election held for Gwynedd Council in Wales

- 5 May 2022

All 69 seats in Gwynedd Council 35 seats needed for a majority
	First party	Second party
Party	Plaid Cymru	Independent
Last election	41 seats, 39%	26 seats, 39%
Seats won	44	23
Seat Change	▲3	▼3
Popular Vote	13,280	10,309
Percentage	50.5%	39.2%
Swing	▲11.5%	▲0.2%
	Third party	Fourth party
Party	Labour	Liberal Democrats
Last election	1 seats, 8%	1 seats, 2%
Seats won	1	1
Seat Change	Steady	Steady
Popular Vote	1,305	608
Percentage	5.0%	2.3%
Swing	▼3.0%	▲0.3%
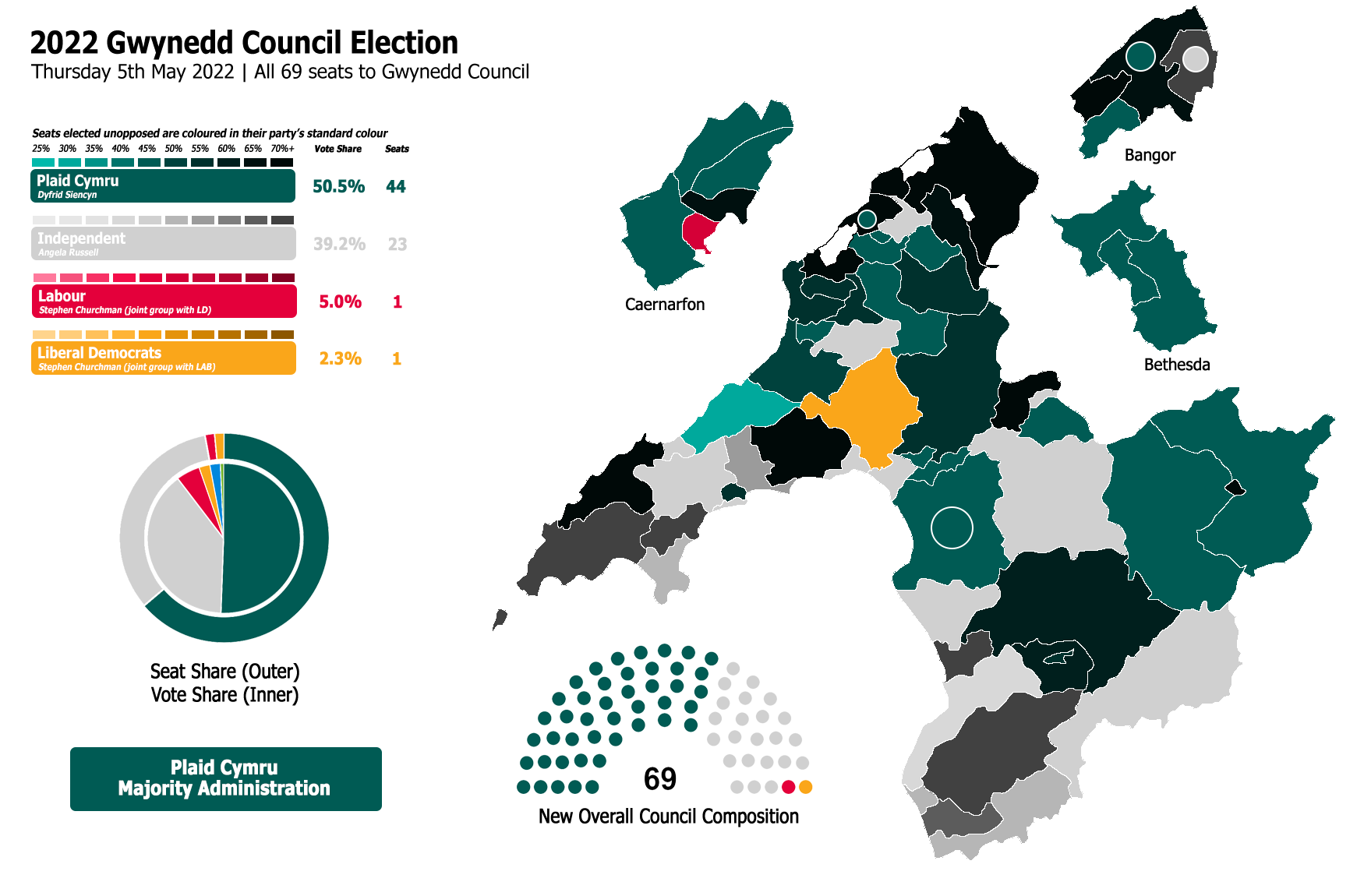
- Map of the results of the election by ward
Council control before election
Plaid Cymru
Council control after election
Plaid Cymru

The 2022 Gwynedd Council election took place on 5 May 2022 to elect 69 members from 65 wards to Gwynedd Council. On the same day, elections were held to the other 21 local authorities and to community councils in Wales as part of the 2022 Welsh local elections. The previous Gwynedd all-council election took place in May 2017 and future elections will take place every five years.

The election saw the amount of councillors elected to Gwynedd Council reduced, from 75 to 69, as part of boundary changes to the council carried out by the Local Democracy and Boundary Commission for Wales. 28 councillors were elected unopposed, an increase from the 2017 Gwynedd Council election which saw 21 councillors elected unopposed, despite the reduction in the total number of seats.

== Election results ==
Plaid Cymru held control of the council, increasing their number of councillors to 44. 23 independent councillors were elected (including sitting Llais Gwynedd councillors who used a blank description on the ballot paper) – a collective loss of nine seats. Labour and the Liberal Democrats returned one seat each.

Gwynedd Council election 2022
Party	Seats	Gains	Losses	Net gain/loss	Seats %	Votes %	Votes	+/−
Plaid Cymru	44	N/A	N/A	▲3	63.8	50.5	13,280	+11.5%
Independent	23	N/A	N/A	▼3	33.3	39.2	10,309	+0.2%
Labour	1	N/A	N/A	Steady	1.4	5.0	1.305	-3.0%
Liberal Democrats	1	N/A	N/A	Steady	1.4	2.3	608	+0.3%
Conservative	Steady	N/A	N/A	Steady	Steady	2.2	590	+1.2%
Llais Gwynedd	0 (Note: Llais Gwynedd councillors stood with no description on the ballot paper and no breakdown was provided by the BBC and Gwynedd Council. They are thus included in the independent figures.)	N/A	N/A	▼6	0.0	0	0	-12.0%
Green	0	N/A	N/A	Steady	0.0	0.7	181	+0.7%

== Ward results ==
=== Aberdyfi ===
Aberdyfi 2022 (1)
Party	Candidate	Votes	%	±%
Independent	Dewi Owen	232	50.7	N/A
Conservative	Dafydd Williams	226	49.3	N/A
Majority		6	1.3	N/A
Turnout		458	48.8	N/A
Independent hold		Swing	N/A	

=== Abererch ===
Abererch 2022 (1)
Party	Candidate	Votes	%	±%
Independent	Richard Glyn Roberts	346	56.7	N/A
Independent	Peter Read (Note: Read was previously a Plaid Cymru councillor for this ward)	163	26.8	N/A
Plaid Cymru	Mici Plwm	101	16.6	N/A
Majority		183	29.9	N/A
Turnout		610	60.0	N/A
Independent gain from Plaid Cymru		Swing	N/A	

=== Abermaw ===
Abermaw 2022 (1)
Party	Candidate	Votes	%	±%
Independent	Rob Triggs	553	72.0	New
Plaid Cymru	Ann Griffith	150	19.5	−52.4
Conservative	Zarina Lamb	65	8.5	New
Majority		403	52.5	N/A
Turnout		768	48.0	+10.3
Independent gain from Plaid Cymru		Swing	+62.2	

=== Abersoch gyda Llanengan ===
Abersoch gyda Llanengan 2022 (1)
Party	Candidate	Votes	%	±%
Independent	John Hughes	252	54.7	N/A
Plaid Cymru	Dewi Wyn Roberts	209	45.3	N/A
Majority		43	9.3	N/A
Turnout		464	51.2	N/A
Independent win (new seat)				

=== Arllechwedd ===
Arllechwedd 2022 (1)
Party	Candidate	Votes	%	±%
Plaid Cymru	Dafydd Meurig	555	81.1	N/A
Independent	Lewis Brown	81	11.8	N/A
Conservative	Bernard Gentry	48	7.0	N/A
Majority		474	69.3	N/A
Turnout		689	42.9	N/A
Plaid Cymru hold		Swing	N/A	

=== Arthrog a Llangelynnin ===
Arthrog a Llangelynnin 2022 (1)
Party	Candidate	Votes	%	±%
Independent	Louise Hughes	279	44.1	N/A
Independent	John Haycock	184	29.1	N/A
Labour	Graham Hogg	170	26.9	N/A
Majority		95	15.0	N/A
Turnout		640	45.9	N/A
Independent win (new seat)				

=== Bethel a'r Felinheli ===
Bethel a'r Felinheli 2022 (2)
Party	Candidate	Votes	%	±%
Plaid Cymru	Sasha Williams	1,073	83.0	N/A
Plaid Cymru	Iwan Huws	946	73.2	N/A
Liberal Democrats	Linda Park	201	15.6	N/A
Majority		745	57.6	N/A
Turnout		1,292	46.1	N/A
Plaid Cymru win (new seat)				
Plaid Cymru win (new seat)				

=== Bontnewydd ===
Bontnewydd 2022 (1)
Party	Candidate	Votes	%	±%
Plaid Cymru	Menna Jones	412	79.7	+47.0
Independent	Gavin Owen (Note: Owen was previously a candidate for Llais Gwynedd in this ward; it is against that result that this is compared)	105	20.3	+15.0
Majority		307	59.4	N/A
Turnout		520	46.3	−22.8
Plaid Cymru gain from Independent		Swing	+16.0	

=== Bowydd and Rhiw ===
Bowydd and Rhiw 2022 (1)
Party	Candidate	Votes	%	±%
Plaid Cymru	Elfed ap Elwyn	313	72.3	+3.3
Independent	Marie Daniels	120	27.7	New
Majority		193	44.6	+6.6
Turnout		435	34.1	−2.2
Plaid Cymru hold		Swing	-12.2	

=== Brithdir and Llanfachreth / Y Ganllwyd / Llanelltyd ===
Brithdir and Llanfachreth / Y Ganllwyd / Llanelltyd 2022 (1)
Party	Candidate	Votes	%	±%
Plaid Cymru	Delyth Griffiths	381	60.2	N/A
Independent	Elfed Lewis	202	31.9	N/A
Labour	Anne Bennett	50	7.9	N/A
Majority		179	28.3	N/A
Turnout		634	54.9	N/A
Plaid Cymru hold		Swing	N/A	

=== Bro Dysynni ===
Bro Dysynni 2022 (1)
Party	Candidate	Votes	%	±%
Independent	Beth Lawton	377	85.9	N/A
Labour	Roger Duke	62	14.1	N/A
Majority		315	71.8	N/A
Turnout		439	43.0	N/A
Independent win (new seat)				

=== Cadnant (Caernarfon) ===
Cadnant (Caernarfon) 2022 (1)
Party	Candidate	Votes	%	±%
Plaid Cymru	Dawn Jones	Unopposed		
Plaid Cymru hold		Swing	N/A	

=== Canol Bangor ===
Canol Bangor 2022 (2)
Party	Candidate	Votes	%	±%
Plaid Cymru	Medwyn Hughes	518	68.7	N/A
Plaid Cymru	Huw Wyn Jones	474	62.9	N/A
Independent	Elis Anwyl	149	19.8	N/A
Liberal Democrats	Simon Ogdon	129	17.1	N/A
Conservative	Daniel Welch	64	8.5	N/A
Majority		369	48.9	N/A
Majority		345	45.8	N/A
Turnout		754		N/A
Plaid Cymru win (new seat)				
Plaid Cymru win (new seat)				

=== Canol Bethesda ===
Canol Bethesda 2022 (1)
Party	Candidate	Votes	%	±%
Plaid Cymru	Rheinallt Puw	Unopposed		
Plaid Cymru win (new seat)				

=== Canol Tref Caernarfon ===
Canol Tref Caernarfon 2022 (1)
Party	Candidate	Votes	%	±%
Plaid Cymru	Olaf Larsen	Unopposed		
Plaid Cymru win (new seat)				

=== Clynnog ===
Clynnog 2022 (1)
Party	Candidate	Votes	%	±%
Plaid Cymru	Dafydd Davies	283	55.6	+33.0
Independent	Selina Lloyd	184	36.1	New
Green	Danielle Murphy	42	8.3	New
Majority		99	19.4	N/A
Turnout		512	50.0	−12.8
Plaid Cymru gain from Llais Gwynedd		Swing	-1.6	

=== Corris a Mawddwy ===
Corris a Mawddwy 2022 (1)
Party	Candidate	Votes	%	±%
Independent	John Roberts	Unopposed		
Independent hold		Swing	N/A	

=== Criccieth ===
Criccieth 2022 (1)
Party	Candidate	Votes	%	±%
Independent	Eirwyn Williams	263	47.3	−21.4
Plaid Cymru	Shannon Orritt	231	41.5	+16.9
Labour	Lorraine Johnson	62	11.2	New
Majority		32	5.8	−38.4
Turnout		559	42.9	−9.9
Independent hold		Swing	-19.2	

=== Cwm y Glo ===
Cwm y Glo 2022 (1)
Party	Candidate	Votes	%	±%
Plaid Cymru	Berwyn Jones	Unopposed		
Plaid Cymru hold		Swing	N/A	

=== De Dolgellau ===
De Dolgellau 2022 (1)
Party	Candidate	Votes	%	±%
Plaid Cymru	Linda Morgan	206	55.7	−3.7
Independent	John Raghoobar	138	37.3	−3.3
Labour	Quentin Deakin	26	7.0	New
Majority		68	18.4	−0.4
Turnout		370	37.6	−11.0
Plaid Cymru hold		Swing	-0.2	

=== De Pwllheli ===
De Pwllheli 2022 (1)
Party	Candidate	Votes	%	±%
Independent	Hefin Underwood	Unopposed		
Independent hold		Swing	N/A	

=== Deiniolen ===
Deiniolen 2022 (1)
Party	Candidate	Votes	%	±%
Plaid Cymru	Elfed Wyn Williams	Unopposed		
Plaid Cymru hold		Swing	N/A	

=== Dewi (Bangor) ===
Dewi (Bangor) 2022 (1)
Party	Candidate	Votes	%	±%
Plaid Cymru	Gareth Roberts	Unopposed		
Plaid Cymru hold		Swing	N/A	

=== Diffwys and Maenofferen ===
Diffwys and Maenofferen 2022 (1)
Party	Candidate	Votes	%	±%
Independent	Glyn Daniels	Unopposed		
Independent gain from Llais Gwynedd		Swing	N/A	

=== Dolbenmaen ===
Dolbenmaen 2022 (1)
Party	Candidate	Votes	%	±%
Liberal Democrats	Stephen Churchman	Unopposed		
Liberal Democrats hold		Swing	N/A	

=== Dwyrain Bangor ===
Dwyrain Bangor 2022 (2)
Party	Candidate	Votes	%	±%
Independent	Nigel Pickavance	565	76.7	N/A
Independent	Dylan Fernley	482	65.5	N/A
Liberal Democrats	Christopher Johnson	156	21.2	N/A
Conservative	Stacey Ingram	72	9.8	N/A
Majority		409	55.6	N/A
Majority		326	44.3	N/A
Turnout		736		N/A
Independent win (new seat)				
Independent win (new seat)				

=== Dwyrain Porthmadog ===
Dwyrain Porthmadog 2022 (1)
Party	Candidate	Votes	%	±%
Plaid Cymru	Nia Wyn Jeffreys	Unopposed		
Plaid Cymru hold		Swing	N/A	

=== Dyffryn Ardudwy ===
Dyffryn Ardudwy 2022 (1)
Party	Candidate	Votes	%	±%
Independent	Eryl Jones-Williams	Unopposed		
Independent hold		Swing	N/A	

=== Efailnewydd a Buan ===
Efailnewydd a Buan 2022 (1)
Party	Candidate	Votes	%	±%
Independent	Anwen Jane	Unopposed		
Independent gain from Llais Gwynedd		Swing	N/A	

=== Gerlan ===
Gerlan 2022 (1)
Party	Candidate	Votes	%	±%
Plaid Cymru	Einir Wyn Williams	Unopposed		
Plaid Cymru hold		Swing	N/A	

=== Glaslyn ===
Glaslyn 2022 (1)
Party	Candidate	Votes	%	±%
Plaid Cymru	June Jones	359	56.4	N/A
Independent	Alwyn Griffiths	277	43.6	N/A
Majority		82	12.8	N/A
Turnout		639	50.0	N/A
Plaid Cymru win (new seat)				

=== Glyder (Bangor) ===
Glyder (Bangor) 2022 (1)
Party	Candidate	Votes	%	±%
Plaid Cymru	Elin Jones	467	87.0	N/A
Independent	Steven Bell	70	13.0	N/A
Majority		397	73.9	N/A
Turnout		540	43.1	N/A
Plaid Cymru hold		Swing	N/A	

=== Gogledd Dolgellau ===
Gogledd Dolgellau 2022 (1)
Party	Candidate	Votes	%	±%
Plaid Cymru	Dyfrig Siencyn	282	60.8	+6.5
Independent	Delwyn Evans	182	39.2	−6.5
Majority		100	21.6	+13.0
Turnout		468	43.3	−3.9
Plaid Cymru hold		Swing	+6.5	

=== Gogledd Pwllheli ===
Gogledd Pwllheli 2022 (1)
Party	Candidate	Votes	%	±%
Plaid Cymru	Elin Hywel	331	55.2	+11.2
Independent	Dylan Bullard	269	44.8	−11.2
Majority		62	10.3	N/A
Turnout		606	38.5	−11.4
Plaid Cymru gain from Independent		Swing	+11.2	

=== Gorllewin Porthmadog ===
Gorllewin Porthmadog 2022 (1)
Party	Candidate	Votes	%	±%
Independent	Gwilym Jones	301	45.3	N/A
Plaid Cymru	Llywelyn Rhys	275	41.4	N/A
Labour	Joe McDonald	88	13.3	N/A
Majority		26	3.9	N/A
Turnout		670	51.1	N/A
Independent gain from Plaid Cymru		Swing	N/A	

=== Gorllewin Tywyn ===
Gorllewin Tywyn 2022 (1)
Party	Candidate	Votes	%	±%
Independent	Anne Lloyd-Jones	298	67.4	N/A
Labour	Denise Bevington	144	32.6	N/A
Majority		154	34.8	N/A
Turnout		446	39.2	N/A
Independent win (new seat)				

=== Harlech a Llanbedr ===
Harlech a Llanbedr 2022 (2)
Party	Candidate	Votes	%	±%
Plaid Cymru	Annwen Hughes	Unopposed		
Plaid Cymru	Gwynfor Owen	Unopposed		
Plaid Cymru win (new seat)				
Plaid Cymru win (new seat)				

=== Hendre ===
Hendre 2022 (1)
Party	Candidate	Votes	%	±%
Labour	Coj Parry	310	50.6	N/A
Plaid Cymru	Anna Evans	303	49.4	N/A
Majority		7	1.1	N/A
Turnout		616	43.4	N/A
Labour win (new seat)				

=== Llanbedrog gyda Mynytho ===
Llanbedrog gyda Mynytho 2022 (1)
Party	Candidate	Votes	%	±%
Independent	Angela Russell	548	95.3	N/A
Conservative	John Fifield	27	4.7	N/A
Majority		521	90.6	N/A
Turnout		583	48.4	N/A
Independent win (new seat)				

=== Llanberis ===
Llanberis 2022 (1)
Party	Candidate	Votes	%	±%
Plaid Cymru	Kimberley Jones	506	59.2	+17.5
Independent	Heather Jones	282	33.0	New
Independent	Colin Owen	67	7.8	New
Majority		224	26.2	N/A
Turnout		860	54.3	−3.6
Plaid Cymru gain from Independent		Swing	-7.8	

=== Llandderfel ===
Llandderfel 2022 (1)
Party	Candidate	Votes	%	±%
Plaid Cymru	Elwyn Edwards	Unopposed		
Plaid Cymru hold		Swing	N/A	

=== Llanllyfni ===
Llanllyfni 2022 (1)
Party	Candidate	Votes	%	±%
Independent	Peter Thomas	304	48.9	New
Plaid Cymru	Dafydd Thomas	267	42.9	−9.8
Green	Dan Thomas	51	8.2	New
Majority		37	6.0	N/A
Turnout		471	43.3	−8.5
Independent gain from Plaid Cymru		Swing	+29.3	

=== Llanrug ===
Llanrug 2022 (1)
Party	Candidate	Votes	%	±%
Plaid Cymru	Beca Brown	Unopposed		
Plaid Cymru hold		Swing	N/A	

=== Llanuwchllyn ===
Llanuwchllyn 2022 (1)
Party	Candidate	Votes	%	±%
Plaid Cymru	Alan Evans*	Unopposed		
Plaid Cymru hold		Swing	N/A	

=== Llanwnda ===
Llanwnda 2022 (1)
Party	Candidate	Votes	%	±%
Plaid Cymru	Huw Llwyd Rowlands	331	58.8	+20.8
Independent	Gareth Humphreys	232	41.2	New
Majority		99	17.6	N/A
Turnout		568	52.5	−1.8
Plaid Cymru gain from Llais Gwynedd		Swing	-10.2	

=== Llanystumdwy ===
Llanystumdwy 2022 (1)
Party	Candidate	Votes	%	±%
Plaid Cymru	Rhys Tudur	538	71.1	N/A
Independent	Gwen Vaughan Jones	136	18.0	New
Independent	Ioan Gwynfor Hughes	83	10.9	New
Majority		402	53.1	N/A
Turnout		760	48.1	N/A
Plaid Cymru hold		Swing	N/A	

=== Menai (Caernarfon) ===
Menai (Caernarfon) 2022 (1)
Party	Candidate	Votes	%	±%
Plaid Cymru	Ioan Thomas	Unopposed		
Plaid Cymru hold		Swing	N/A	

=== Morfa Nefyn a Thudweiliog ===
Morfa Nefyn a Thudweiliog 2022 (1)
Party	Candidate	Votes	%	±%
Plaid Cymru	Gareth Tudor Jones	638	76.0	N/A
Independent	Hughie Williams	202	24.0	N/A
Majority		436	52.0	N/A
Turnout		840	49.8	N/A
Plaid Cymru win (new seat)				

=== Morfa Tywyn ===
Morfa Tywyn 2022 (1)
Party	Candidate	Votes	%	±%
Independent	John Pughe	274	52.6	N/A
Independent	Mike Stevens	247	47.4	N/A
Majority		27	5.2	N/A
Turnout		521	37.9	N/A
Independent win (new seat)				

=== Nefyn ===
Nefyn 2022 (1)
Party	Candidate	Votes	%	±%
Independent	Gruffydd Williams (Note: Williams was previously a Plaid Cymru councillor for this ward, however he was suspended from the party in 2021 amid Covid misinformation claims)	Unopposed		
Independent gain from Plaid Cymru		Swing	N/A	

=== Peblig (Caernarfon) ===
Peblig (Caernarfon) 2022 (1)
Party	Candidate	Votes	%	±%
Plaid Cymru	Dewi Jones	444	65.8	+16.0
Independent	Jonathan Jones	231	34.2	N/A
Majority		213	31.6	N/A
Turnout		677	37.8	N/A
Plaid Cymru gain from Independent		Swing	-9.1	

=== Pen draw Llŷn ===
Pen draw Llŷn 2022 (1)
Party	Candidate	Votes	%	±%
Independent	Gareth Williams	697	77.4	N/A
Independent	Dafydd Huw Williams	203	22.6	N/A
Majority		694	49.8	N/A
Turnout		903	61.0	N/A
Independent win (new seat)				

=== Pen-y-groes ===
Pen-y-groes 2022 (1)
Party	Candidate	Votes	%	±%
Plaid Cymru	Craig ab Iago	Unopposed		
Plaid Cymru hold		Swing	N/A	

=== Penisarwaun ===
Penisarwaun 2022 (1)
Party	Candidate	Votes	%	±%
Independent	Elwyn Jones*	Unopposed		
Independent hold		Swing	N/A	

=== Penrhyndeudraeth ===
Penrhyndeudraeth 2022 (1)
Party	Candidate	Votes	%	±%
Plaid Cymru	Meryl Roberts	Unopposed		
Plaid Cymru hold		Swing	N/A	

=== Rachub ===
Rachub 2022 (1)
Party	Candidate	Votes	%	±%
Plaid Cymru	Paul John Rowlinson	Unopposed		
Plaid Cymru hold		Swing	N/A	

=== Teigl ===
Teigl 2022 (1)
Party	Candidate	Votes	%	±%
Plaid Cymru	Linda Ann Jones	Unopposed		
Plaid Cymru hold		Swing	N/A	

=== Trawsfynydd ===
Trawsfynydd 2022 (1)
Party	Candidate	Votes	%	±%
Independent	Elfed Roberts*	Unopposed		
Independent hold		Swing	N/A	

=== Tregarth a Mynydd Llandygai ===
Tregarth a Mynydd Llandygai 2022 (1)
Party	Candidate	Votes	%	±%
Plaid Cymru	Beca Roberts	663	69.9	N/A
Labour	Huw Vaughan Jones	197	20.8	N/A
Conservative	John Hardy	88	9.3	N/A
Majority		466	49.1	N/A
Turnout		953	55.9	N/A
Plaid Cymru hold		Swing	N/A	

=== Tryfan ===
Tryfan 2022 (1)
Party	Candidate	Votes	%	±%
Plaid Cymru	Arwyn Herald Roberts	315	59.9	N/A
Independent	Aeron Maldwyn Jones	136	25.9	N/A
Independent	Lari Parc	75	14.2	N/A
Majority		179	34.0	N/A
Turnout		528	46.1	N/A
Plaid Cymru win (new seat)				

=== Waunfawr ===
Waunfawr 2022 (1)
Party	Candidate	Votes	%	±%
Plaid Cymru	Edgar Wyn Owen*	Unopposed		
Plaid Cymru hold		Swing	N/A	

=== Y Bala ===
Y Bala 2022 (1)
Party	Candidate	Votes	%	±%
Plaid Cymru	Dilwyn Morgan*	618	87.5	N/A
Green	Fiona Hopkins	88	12.5	N/A
Majority		530	75.0	N/A
Turnout		713	49.8	N/A
Plaid Cymru hold		Swing	N/A	

=== Y Faenol ===
Y Faenol 2022 (1)
Party	Candidate	Votes	%	±%
Plaid Cymru	Menna Baines	461	79.1	N/A
Liberal Democrats	Andrew Richard Joyce	122	20.9	N/A
Majority		339	58.2	N/A
Turnout		592	34.3	N/A
Plaid Cymru win (new seat)				

=== Y Groeslon ===
Y Groeslon 2022 (1)
Party	Candidate	Votes	%	±%
Plaid Cymru	Llio Elenid Owen	432	55.6	N/A
Independent	Bethan Mair Williams	345	44.4	N/A
Majority		87	11.2	N/A
Turnout		780	55.4	N/A
Plaid Cymru win (new seat)				

=== Yr Eifl ===
Yr Eifl 2022 (1)
Party	Candidate	Votes	%	±%
Plaid Cymru	Jina Gwyrfai	198	34.8	N/A
Labour	Cian Ireland	196	34.4	N/A
Independent	Lois Fychan	175	30.8	N/A
Majority		2	0.4	N/A
Turnout		571	47.4	N/A
Plaid Cymru win (new seat)				

== By-elections ==
=== Llanuwchllyn ===
Llanuwchllyn: 22 September 2022 replacing Alan Evans (failed to sign declaration of office)
Party	Candidate	Votes	%	±%
Plaid Cymru	Alan Evans*	368	95.8	N/A
Liberal Democrats	Anne Margaret Williams	16	4.2	N/A
Majority		352	91.6	N/A
Turnout		384	48.5	N/A
Plaid Cymru hold		Swing	N/A	

=== Criccieth ===
Criccieth: 8 February 2024
Party	Candidate	Votes	%	±%
Plaid Cymru	Sian Williams	381	71.9	+30.4
Independent	John Allport	129	24.3	N/A
Liberal Democrats	Andrew Richard Joyce	11	2.1	N/A
Conservative	Bernard Gentry	9	1.7	N/A
Majority		252	47.6	N/A
Turnout		530		N/A
Plaid Cymru gain from Independent		Swing	N/A	

=== Llanberis ===
Llanberis: 17 October 2024
Party	Candidate	Votes	%	±%
Plaid Cymru	Gwilym Evans	422	60.9	+30.4
Green	Dewi Rhys Evans	254	36.7	N/A
Liberal Democrats	Anne Margaret Williams	9	1.3	N/A
Independent	Martin Andrew Jones	8	1.2	N/A
Majority		168	24.2	N/A
Turnout		693		N/A
Plaid Cymru hold		Swing	N/A	

=== Abermaw ===
Abermaw: 21 August 2025
Party	Candidate	Votes	%	±%
Independent	Wendy Lorraine Cleaver	299	49.6	N/A
Independent	Deana Davies Fisher	161	26.7	N/A
Reform	Terry Temple	107	17.7	N/A
Conservative	Hedd Vaughan Thomas	20	3.3	−5.1
Pirate	Chris Green	11	1.8	N/A
Liberal Democrats	Andrew Joyce	5	0.8	N/A
Majority		138	22.9	N/A
Turnout		603	37.4	−10.6
Independent hold		Swing		

=== Bethel a'r Felinheli ===
Bethel a'r Felinheli 14 November 2025
Party	Candidate	Votes	%	±%
Plaid Cymru	Gwion Emyr	659	59.2	−25
Independent	Kelly O'Donnell	369	33.2	N/A
Reform	Terry Temple	76	6.8	N/A
Conservative	Hedd Thomas	9	0.8	N/A
Turnout		1,113	39.7	−6.4
Plaid Cymru hold		Swing		
