= Porthmadog East =

Coordinates: 52.931°N 4.117°W

Dwyrain Porthmadog
- Electoral ward
- Location within Gwynedd
- Population: 1,775 (2011 census)
- Community: Porthmadog
- Principal area: Gwynedd
- Country: Wales
- Sovereign state: United Kingdom
- Post town: PORTHMADOG
- Postcode district: LL49
- Dialling code: 01766
- UK Parliament: Dwyfor Meirionnydd
- Senedd Cymru – Welsh Parliament: Dwyfor Meirionnydd
- Councillors: 1 (County); 4 (Town Council)

Porthmadog East, since 2022 officially known by the Welsh name of Dwyrain Porthmadog, is one of the electoral wards in the town of Porthmadog in Gwynedd, Wales. It elects representatives to the town and county councils.

== Description ==
The county electoral ward covers the northeast corner of the Porthmadog community, including the east and north parts of the town, but excluding the village of Tremadog. The county ward is partially bordered to the west by the Welsh Highland Railway (to Caernarfon). Its southern border is defined partially by the railway line to Criccieth, Porthmadog's High Street and the A497 road to Minffordd. The Porthmadog-Tremadog ward lies to the northwest and the Penrhyndeudraeth ward lies to the west.

The ward population, according to the 2011 Census, was 1,775.

== Town Council ==
The East (Dwyreiniol) ward of Pwllheli (wholly east of the railway and slightly smaller than the county ward) elects four of the sixteen town councillors to Porthmadog Town Council.

== County Council ==
Porthmadog East has been an electoral ward to Gwynedd Council since 1995, electing one county councillor. Initially represented by Plaid Cymru, it was won by Independent Ieuan Roberts in 1999, beating Plaid Cymru's Gwynfor Owen. Roberts was subsequently re-elected after being opposed by Plaid Cymru's Alwyn Griffiths. At the 2008 elections, he was returned unopposed after switching to Plaid Cymru.

In May 2012 the ward seat was won by Jason Humphreys for Llais Gwynedd, beating Plaid Cymru's Gwynfor Owen by 53 votes.

In May 2017 Humphreys was beaten by Plaid Cymru's Nia Wyn Jeffreys, who won with a 83-vote majority.

== See also ==
- List of electoral wards in Gwynedd
