= Deiniol (electoral ward) =

Former electoral ward of Gwynedd, Wales

Coordinates: 53.226°N 4.127°W

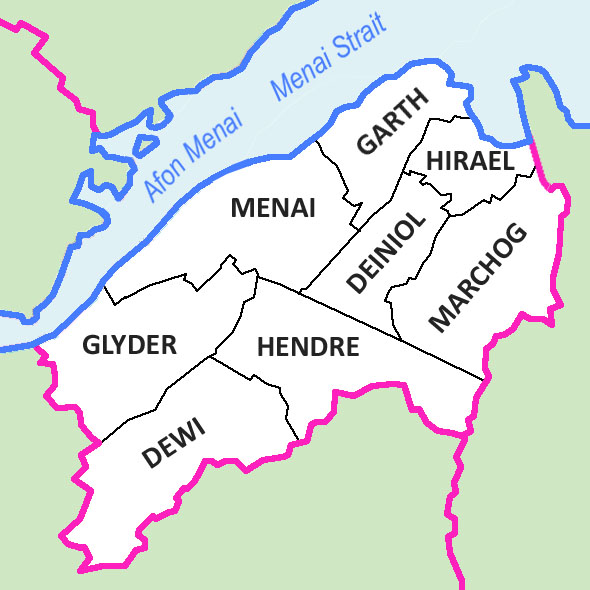
Electoral wards in Bangor

Deiniol is one of eight electoral wards in the city of Bangor, Gwynedd, Wales, electing councillors to the city and county councils.

== Description ==
The ward covers the centre of the city including the High Street and Bangor Cathedral (dedicated to St Deiniol). It is bounded to the northwest by the A5 road, to the northeast by Maes-y-Dref and to the southwest by the railway. It elects two councillors to Bangor City Council and one county councillor to Gwynedd Council.

The ward population, according to the 2011 census, was 1,839.

== County ward ==
In the May 2017 county council election Plaid Cymru regained the seat from the Labour Party, having lost it in 2012.

Gwynedd Council election, 4 May 2017
Party	Candidate	Votes	%	±%
Plaid Cymru	Collings, Steve	74	39.57	
Independent	Jones, Enid	41	21.93	
Labour	Kieran, Kerry Ann	41	21.93	
Liberal Democrats	Shultan, Mohammed	31	16.58	

Gwynedd Council election, 3 May 2012
Party	Candidate	Votes	%	±%
Labour	Edwards, David Gwynfor	66	36.67	
Plaid Cymru	Llewellyn, Dewi *	62	34.44	
Liberal Democrats	Shultan, Mohammed	52	28.89	

* = sitting councillor prior to the election

== Welsh Language ==
According to the United Kingdom Census 2021, 19.6 per cent of all usual residents aged 3+ in Deiniol could speak Welsh. 27.4 per cent of the population noted that they could speak, read, write or understand Welsh. The 2021 Census showed that Deiniol was the area in Gwynedd that had the highest proportion of its population with no Welsh language skills. According to the 2011 Census, 22.8 per cent of the population could speak Welsh.

== 2022 dissolution ==
A 2018 report by the Boundary Commission for Wales proposed the merger of Deiniol with neighbouring Bangor wards to form a new two-member ward. Low voter registration of the university students was blamed for the small electorates in the city. This was enacted by The County of Gwynedd (Electoral Arrangements) Order 2021 which, from the 2022 local election, split Deiniol and merged it with the neighbouring wards of Hendre and Hirael.

== See also ==
- List of electoral wards in Gwynedd
- Glyder (electoral ward)
