= Seiont (electoral ward) =

Coordinates: 53.132°N 4.277°W

- Electoral ward
- Location within Gwynedd
- Population: 3,038 (2011 census)
- Community: Caernarfon
- Principal area: Gwynedd
- Country: Wales
- Sovereign state: United Kingdom
- Post town: CAERNARFON
- Postcode district: LL55
- Dialling code: 01286

Seiont was an electoral ward in the town of Caernarfon, Gwynedd, Wales, electing councillors to the town council and Gwynedd Council. It was abolished for the 2022 elections.

== Description ==
The Seiont ward covered an area either side of the Afon Seiont in the southern part of the community. The ward included the southern part of Caernarfon town centre, including Caernarfon Castle, Caernarfon railway station and the housing estates south of the A4085.

Seiont was bordered to the north by the A4085 (Constantine Road) and Caernarfon High Street, to the northwest by the Menai Strait and was surrounded to the southeast and southwest by the Bontnewydd ward.

The ward population, according to the 2011 Census, was 3,038.

== Town ward ==
Seiont was an electoral ward to Caernarfon Town Council electing four of the seventeen town councillors.

== District ward ==
Seiont was a ward of Arfon Borough Council (abolished 1996), electing two councillors (Independent and Plaid Cymru) at the 1987 and 1991 elections.

== Gwynedd county ward ==
Seiont was an electoral ward of Gwynedd Council from 1995 to 2022, electing two county councillors, a mixture of Independent, Plaid Cymru, Labour Party and Llais Gwynedd representatives.

Following the death of Independent councillor Bob Anderson, a by-election was held on 7 October 2010. It was won by Llais Gwynedd's Endaf Cooke with a majority of 120 over the Plaid Cymru candidate. Cooke retained his seat at the May 2012 county council election.

At the 2017 elections Plaid Cymru regained their seat.

Gwynedd Council election, 4 May 2017
Party	Candidate	Votes	%	±%
Independent	W. Roy OWEN *	563	28.2	
Plaid Cymru	Olaf Cai LARSEN	282	14.1	
Labour	Gareth PARRY	261	13.1	
Llais Gwynedd	Endaf COOKE *	251	12.6	
Plaid Cymru	Glyn TOMOS	248	12.4	
Independent	Keith JONES	217	10.9	
Independent	Arfon Lewis JONES	176	8.8	
Turnout		1998	46.5	

* = sitting councillor prior to the election

Seiont's Independent councillor Roy Owen was leader of the Independent group for ten years on the county council, until he resigned from the group in May 2017 to form the Gwynedd United Independents. Cllr Owen made the news in 2018 when he personally filled in over 90 potholes in the ward's highways, though Gwynedd Council advised him to stop.

== See also ==
- List of electoral wards in Gwynedd
- Peblig, Caernarfon
