= Bangor City Council =

Community council in Gwynedd, Wales

Bangor City Council Cyngor Dinas Bangor

Type
- Type: Community council

Leadership
- Mayor: Richard Medwyn Hughes, Plaid Cymru
- Deputy Mayor: Delyth Russell, Independent
- Seats: 20

Meeting place
- Penrhyn Hall, Ffordd Gwynedd, Bangor

Website
- bangorcitycouncil.com

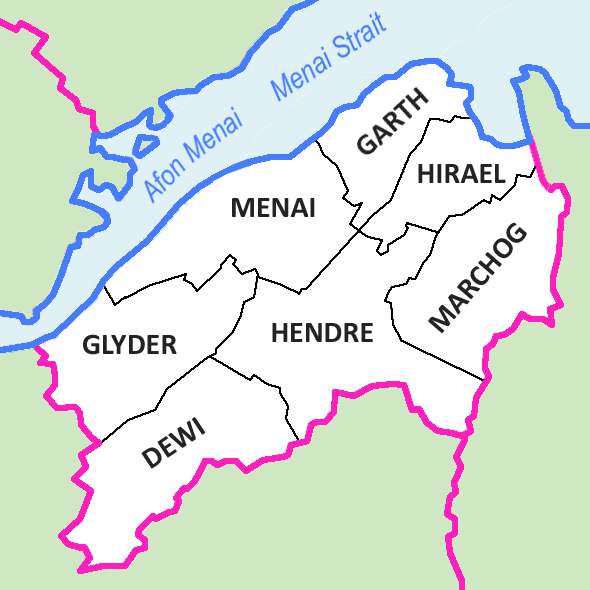
Electoral wards in Bangor, Gwynedd, since 2022

Bangor City Council or officially the City of Bangor Council is an elected community council serving Bangor in Gwynedd, Wales.

== Background ==
Bangor's council was created in 1883 by royal charter. In 1974 it became City of Bangor Council, after Bangor had been granted city status, though many of its previous powers were passed to Arfon Borough Council (1974–1996) and the new Gwynedd Council, based in Caernarfon.

The city council's roles include consultation on all planning applications within the city boundaries, as well as applications for alcohol licenses. Its current responsibilities extend to maintaining footpaths and bus shelters, as well as managing a number of woodland areas and open public spaces.

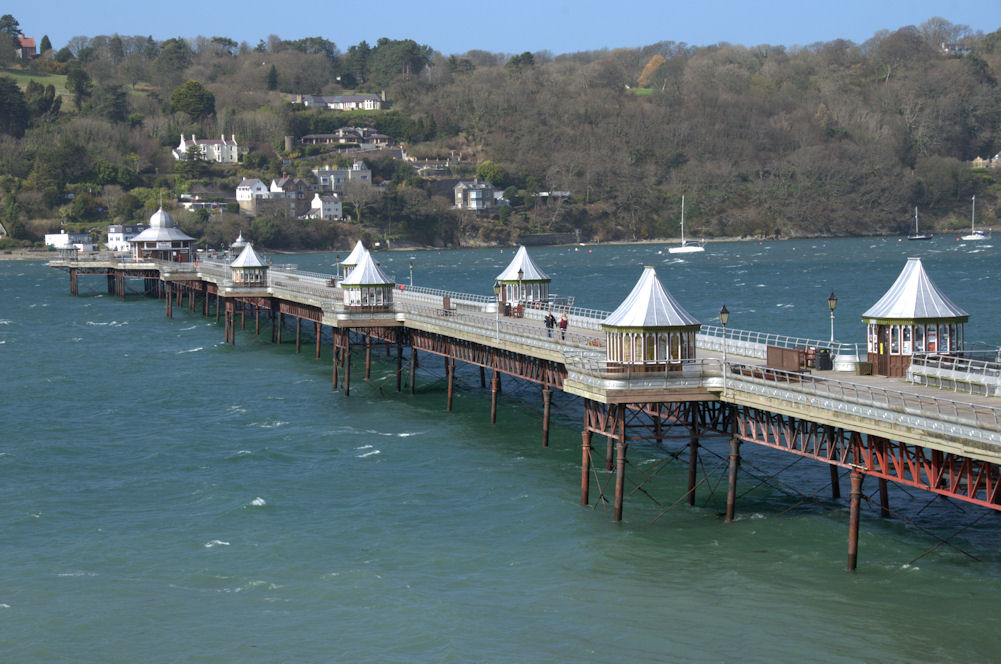
Garth Pier, owned by the council

The city council is most notably responsible for the maintenance of Wales' second longest pier, the Garth Pier. After Arfon Borough Council had decided to demolish it in 1974, Bangor City Council bought the 1,550 feet (470 m) pier for a nominal one penny. However, in 2012 the council only had £1 million of the estimated £2 million needed to repair it. The council-financed £1 million restoration began in 2017, phased over three to four years.

In addition the city council owns a number of important buildings, including the Town Clock, the City Council Offices and Penhryn Hall (containing the Council Chamber) in Ffordd Gwynedd. It owns Nantporth Football Stadium, which it leases to Nantporth CIC. It also owns the HwB centre at Tan y Fynwent, a multi purpose community space located in the city centre.

In June 2012 a curfew keeping young people out of Bangor city centre made the UK national news. Bangor City Council had to call an emergency meeting to raise their concerns, because Gwynedd Council and the local police had imposed the curfew without consulting city councillors.

In May 2021 Bangor became the first Welsh city council and the sixteenth in the UK to pass a resolution supporting the Treaty on the Prohibition of Nuclear Weapons.

== Representation ==
Twenty councillors were elected from the eight electoral wards in the city, namely: Deiniol (2), Dewi (3), Garth (2), Glyder (3), Hendre (2), Hirael (2), Marchog (3) and Menai (3). In 2017 half of the seats were won by Plaid Cymru. The eight wards also elected ten county councillors to Gwynedd Council.

As a result of The County of Gwynedd (Electoral Arrangements) Order 2021 the Deiniol ward was split and merged with its neighbouring wards of Hendre and Hirael, effective from the 2022 elections. Representation on the city council was adjusted to Dewi (3), Garth (1), Glyder (3), Hendre (3), Hirael (3), Marchog (4) and Menai (3), remaining at a total of twenty councillors.

== Mayor ==
The council elects a city mayor and deputy mayor annually. The Mayor making for 2020 was delayed by a year due to COVID-19 and both the Deputy Mayor and Mayor were to remain in their posts for another year until 2021.

In May 2021 22-year old Owen Hurcum was elected mayor, the youngest ever mayor in Wales and also possibly the first non-binary person in the world to hold such a position.

List of City Mayors since 1974:

2025- Richard Medwyn Hughes

2024 - Gareth M.Parry
2023 - Dr.Elin Walker Jones
2022 - Gwynant Roberts
2021 - Owen J. Hurcum
2020 - John Wynn Williams
2019 - John Wynn Williams
2018 - John Wynn Jones
2017 - Derek C. Hainge
2016 - Dewi Wynn Williams
2015 - Evelyn M. Butler
2014 - Jean Elizabeth Forsyth
2013 - Douglas Madge
2012 - Bryn Hughes
2011 - Edward Huw Williams
2010 - Dorothy M. Bulled, MBE
2009 - Jean Elizabeth Forsyth
2008 - John Wynn Jones
2007 - Derek C. Hainge
2006 - Douglas Madge
2005 - Geraint H. Roberts
2004 - Bryn Hughes
2003 - June E. Marshall
2002 - Dorothy M. Bulled
2001 - John Martin
2000 - Tony W.Eccles
1999 - John Wynn Jones
1998 - Derek C. Hainge
1997 - Lesley Hales
1996 - Gill Luther-Jones
1995 - Evelyn M. Butler
1994 - T. Arwyn Evans
1993 - Gareth Buckley-Jones
1992 - John Llewelyn-Jones
1991 - Keith Greenly-Jones
1990 - Doreen N. Murray
1989 - Tony W. Eccles
1988 - John Martin
1987 - Edward T. Dogan
1986 - R. Keith Marshall
1985 - Christine C. Norris
1984 - Iris M.Parry, MBE, JP
1983 - Frank Woodcock
1982 - John Haydn Jones
1981 - Edward T. Dogan
1980 - Glenda W.Jones
1979 - Gareth Buckley-Jones
1978 - Jean D. Christie
1977 - Charles A. Hainge
1976 - Iris M. Parry
1975 - Frank Woodcock
1974 - Jean D. Christie

== Council composition ==
As of 20 June 2022
Affiliation	Members
Plaid Cymru	12
Independent	7
Vacant	1
