= Ogwen =

Ogwen may refer to:

== Places ==
- Ogwen (electoral ward), covering the village of Bethesda in Gwynedd, Wales
- Afon Ogwen, a river in Gwynedd, Wales
- Llyn Ogwen, its source
- Dyffryn Ogwen or Ogwen Valley, its valley
- Ogwen Cottage, an outdoor education centre by Llyn Ogwen
- Ogwen Group, an Ordovician lithostratigraphic group in Gwynedd, north-west Wales
- Ogwen Rural District, a former rural district in Caernarfonshire, Wales from 1894 to 1974

== People ==
- John Ogwen, Welsh actor
