= Owen Hurcum =

British politician (born 1997)

Owen Exie Hurcum
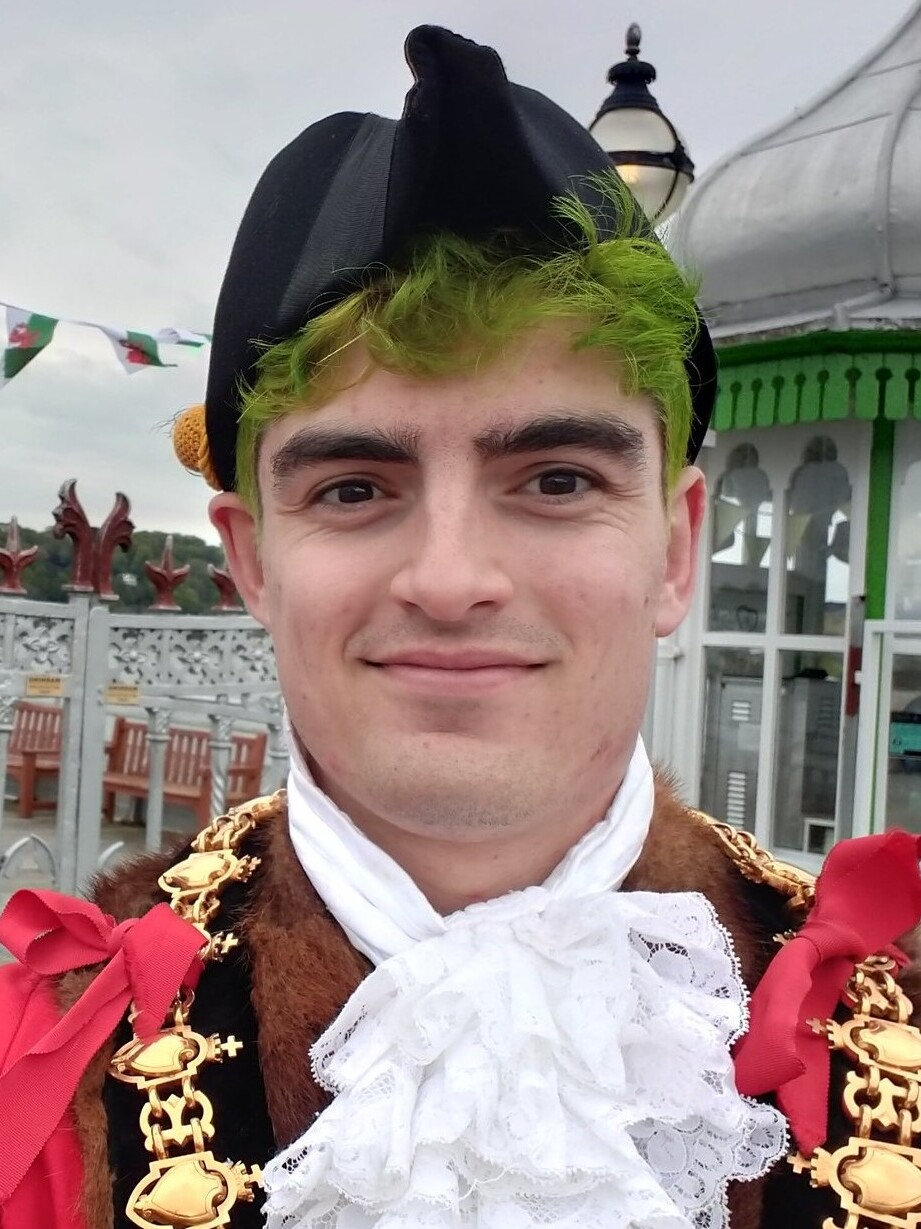
- Hurcum in May 2021

Mayor of Bangor
- In office May 2021 – May 2022
- Preceded by: John Wyn Williams
- Succeeded by: Gwynant Roberts

Personal details
- Born: 1997 or 1998 (age 28–29) Harrow, London, England
- Party: Green Party (2024–present)
- Other political affiliations: Breakthrough Party (2022–2023); Independent (2021–2022); Plaid Cymru (until 2021)
- Education: Bangor University

Owen Exie J. Hurcum (born Owen J. Hurcum, 1997) is a British former politician. They are the former Mayor of the city of Bangor, Wales, and former ward councillor for Glyder ward on Bangor City Council. When elected the Mayor of Bangor in May 2021, they became the first openly non-binary mayor of any city worldwide, and the youngest person to hold a mayoral position in the history of Wales. In May 2022 they completed their term as mayor and did not seek re-election to the community council.

== Career ==
Originally from the London suburb of Harrow, Hurcum studied at Whitmore High School during which time they won the 2013 Harrow Regional Final of Jack Petchey's Speak Out Challenge. Hurcum moved to Bangor in 2015 to attend Bangor University to study Archaeology, graduating with a First in 2019.

In January 2019, Hurcum co-organised a protest against proposed cuts at Bangor University which would have seen up to 60 staff members at risk of losing their jobs and the closure of the university's Department of Chemistry. In September 2019, they organised a protest on Bangor High Street against Boris Johnson's prorogation of Parliament ahead of the Brexit withdrawal treaty deadline. The prorogation was later found to be unlawful.

Hurcum was appointed unopposed as deputy mayor in 2019. During this time, Hurcum was the target of abuse from the Twitter account of a primary school in Cardiff after they stated that "You are Welsh if you feel Welsh, being born abroad has nothing to do with that." The school claimed an individual had gained unauthorised access to their Twitter account and pledged to launch an investigation.

Hurcum was due to run as a Plaid Cymru candidate in the 2021 Senedd election, being fourth on Plaid's regional list for North Wales, which would have made them Plaid's first ever openly non-binary candidate. However, on 3 March 2021, they withdrew from the election and resigned from the party, citing transphobia. They continued to sit on Bangor Council as an independent, until January 2022 when they announced they had joined the Breakthrough Party.

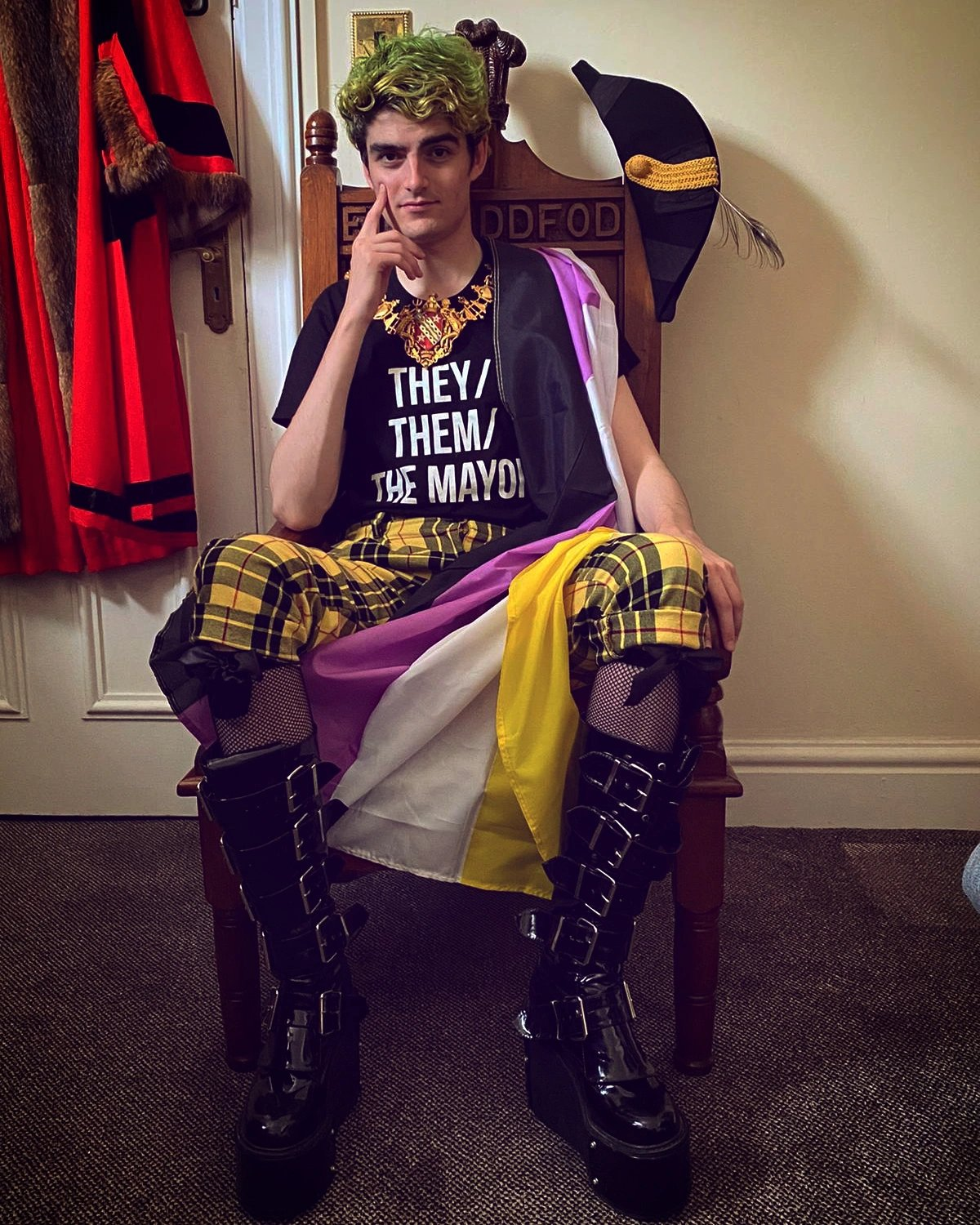
Hurcum with the non-binary flag

In May 2021, councillors elected Hurcum to the position of Mayor of Bangor City Council for the 2021–22 term, with Plaid Cymru's Gwynant Roberts taking the deputy mayor position. On 14 November 2021 Hurcum laid a Remembrance Day wreath at Bangor Cathedral on behalf of the people of the City. Hurcum completed this term as Mayor in May 2022 and did not seek re-election to the City Council due to their plan to move to England for at least a year to renovate a boat.

Hurcum's debut book Don't Ask About my Genitals : An Introductory Manifesto to Trans and Non-Binary Equality was published in May 2022.

They continued their postgraduate studies at Bangor, studying an MA in Celtic Archaeology, graduating from the University in December 2022 with a Distinction. In 2023 they started their PhD at the University of York, focusing on Transgender Archaeology. Owen, for their PhD, has been researching Transgender Archaeology, which they define as "the relationship of our discipline to the transgender community, genders outside of the modern settler/West’s dominating binary construct of cisgender man/woman".

== Political positions ==
Hurcum supports Welsh independence, but has been hugely critical of transphobia in the independence movement, including abuse they have personally faced, and have stated that an independent Wales "should be one built on equality and acceptance." They opposed the renaming of the Second Severn Crossing to the Prince of Wales Bridge in 2018.

Hurcum has also spoken in favour of, and campaigned for, transgender rights in the United Kingdom as a whole, including for improved access to trans healthcare in the NHS, amending the Equality Act 2010 to explicitly include non-binary people, and introducing third gender options for passports and other identity documents.

They have opposed increases of post-secondary tuition fees by the Welsh Labour Senedd government.

On 27 January 2022 Hurcum announced that they had joined the Breakthrough Party. They have since joined the Green Party.

== Personal life ==
Hurcum is genderqueer and agender, with they/them pronouns. Hurcum has said "I know I'm not a bloke, but I know I'm not a trans woman either". They are pansexual.

In March 2022 Hurcum said they would be moving back to England to renovate a 1940s houseboat, citing property prices as a reason. The intention was to return to Bangor with the boat after the renovation had been completed.

Hurcum is an expert Carcassonne player and competed in the 2025 European Team Carcassonne Online Championship as a member of team UK. They also reached the semi-finals of the 2025 UK Online Carcassonne Championship.
