= 2008 Gwynedd Council election =

2008 Welsh local government election

Results of the 2008 Gwynedd Council election

The 2008 Gwynedd Council election took place on 1 May 2008 to elect members of Gwynedd Council, the council of the county of Gwynedd in Wales. This was on the same day as the other 2008 United Kingdom local elections. The previous council election took place in 2004 and the following election was held in 2012.

In the election, Plaid Cymru lost control of the council to no overall control.

== Results ==
Party	Seats	Change
Plaid Cymru	35	▼6
Independent	18	▼1
Llais Gwynedd	13	▲13
Labour	5	▼5
Liberal Democrats	4	▼3

== See also ==
- 2008 Welsh local elections
