= Ogwen (electoral ward) =

Electoral ward in Bethesda, Gwynedd, Wales

Coordinates: 53.183°N 4.066°W

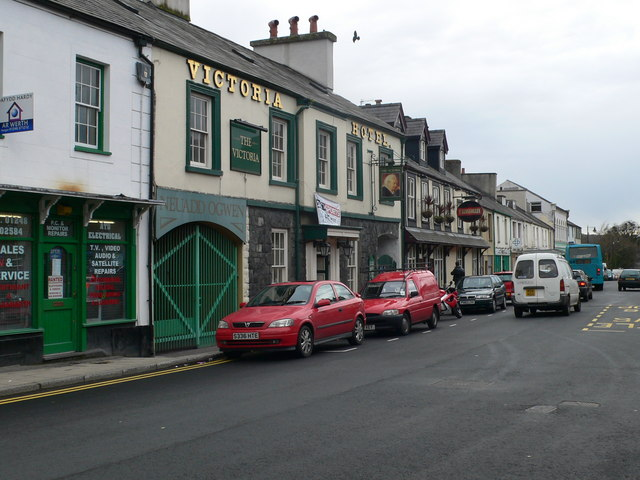
High Street (A5), Bethesda

Ogwen is an electoral ward covering part of the village and community of Bethesda in Gwynedd, Wales. It elects councillors to the community council and Gwynedd Council.

== Description ==
The ward covers the centre of Bethesda, its High Street and schools. It is bordered to the west by the Afon Ogwen, with the Afon Llafar defining its southern border. To the south and the east of Ogwen is the ward of Gerlan, which includes the Gerlan area and the village of Rachub.

== Community Council ==
Ogwen is a community ward to Bethesda Community Council, electing seven of the thirteen community councillors.

== County Council ==
Between 1973 and 1989 Ogwen was the name of a ward to Gwynedd County Council, electing two county councillors (one of only two county wards to elect more than one).

From 1995 Ogwen became a ward to the new Gwynedd Council, electing one county councillor. Since 1995 it has been represented by Plaid Cymru, with Ann Williams the councillor from 2004 to 2017. At the May 2017 election the seat was won by Plaid Cymru's Rheinallt Puw.

== See also ==
- List of electoral wards in Gwynedd
