= Pwllheli South =

Coordinates: 52.881°N 4.423°W

De Pwllheli
- Electoral ward
- Location within Gwynedd
- Population: 1,886 (2011 census)
- Community: Pwllheli
- Principal area: Gwynedd
- Country: Wales
- Sovereign state: United Kingdom
- Post town: PWLLHELI
- Postcode district: LL53
- Dialling code: 01758
- UK Parliament: Dwyfor Meirionnydd
- Senedd Cymru – Welsh Parliament: Dwyfor Meirionnydd
- Councillors: 1 (County); 8 (Town Council)

Pwllheli South, since 2022 officially known by the Welsh name of De Pwllheli, is one of the electoral wards in the town of Pwllheli on the coast of the Llŷn Peninsula in Gwynedd, Wales. It elects representatives to the town and county councils.

== Description ==
The ward covers the south of the town along the coast including Pwllheli Golf Club in the west, the areas of West End and South Beach south of the Afon Rhyd-hir, to Morfa'r Garreg, the Pwllheli Lifeboat Station and nearby caravan park on the spit of land south of the mouth of the Afon Erch. It is bordered to the north by the Pwllheli North ward, which includes Pwllheli town centre.

The ward population, according to the 2011 Census, was 1,886.

== Town Council ==
The South ward (Ward y De) of Pwllheli elects eight of the fifteen town councillors to Pwllheli Town Council.

== County Council ==
Pwllheli South (De Pwllheli since 2022) has been an electoral ward to Gwynedd Council since 1995, electing one county councillor. It was represented by Plaid Cymru's Alan Williams from 1995, but won by Bob Wright for Llais Gwynedd at the May 2008 elections.

Councillor Wright died whilst on a lifeboat mission to rescue a stranded yacht, on 20 September 2015. He had received an MBE in June 2008 for his service with the RNLI. The resulting by-election on 26 November 2015 was won by Bob Wright's cousin, Hefin Underwood, who did not represent a party or group.

Underwood held off the challenge from Plaid Cymru at the May 2017 elections, with a majority of 388.

== See also ==
- List of electoral wards in Gwynedd
- Gwynedd Council elections
