= Peblig, Caernarfon =

Coordinates: 53.138°N 4.256°W

Peblig
- Electoral ward
- Location within Gwynedd
- Population: 2,321 (2011 census)
- Community: Caernarfon
- Principal area: Gwynedd
- Country: Wales
- Sovereign state: United Kingdom
- Post town: CAERNARFON
- Postcode district: LL55
- Dialling code: 01286
- UK Parliament: Dwyfor Meirionnydd
- Senedd Cymru – Welsh Parliament: Arfon
- Councillors: 1 (County); 5 (Town Council)

Peblig is an electoral ward in the town of Caernarfon, Gwynedd, Wales, electing councillors to the town council and Gwynedd Council.

== Description ==
The Peblig ward covers an area east of Caernarfon town centre, sandwiched by two A roads - to the north by the A4086 (Llanberis Road) and to the south by the A4085. The meandering Afon Seiont and the boundary of the Cibyn Industrial Estate form the eastern border. The ward includes the town's Church of St Peblig. The new environmentally friendly primary school, Ysgol y Hendre, is at the centre of the ward.

The ward population, according to the 2011 Census, was 2,321.

== Town ward ==
Peblig is a ward to Caernarfon Town Council electing five of the seventeen town councillors.

In February 2019 Peblig town councillor, Kenny Richards known as Kenny Khan, claimed he was facing "discrimination" by being denied a seat on the Ysgol y Hendre Board of Governors. Despite a previous spell in gaol he was described as a "community champion" who ran affordable food outlets locally and in 2017 had been voted unanimously by the town council to be their representative on the Board.

== County ward ==
Peblig became an electoral ward to (the pre-1996) Gwynedd County Council in 1989, electing an independent councillor in 1989 and 1993.

Peblig has been an electoral ward to Gwynedd Council since 1995, electing one county councillor. Cllr W. Tudor Owen represented the ward from 1995, firstly as an independent but winning the 1999 elections for Plaid Cymru. He had previously represented the ward on Arfon Borough Council. He was elected as vice chair of the county council in May 2011.

In the May 2012 county council election Cllr Owen retained the seat, beating the Llais Gwynedd candidate by 45 votes.

At the May 2017 county election Owen lost by only 3 votes to Independent candidate, Jason Parry.

Gwynedd Council election, 4 May 2017
Party	Candidate	Votes	%	±%
Independent	Jason Wayne PARRY	311	50.2	
Plaid Cymru	W. Tudor OWEN *	308	49.8	
Turnout		619	43.2	
Independent gain from Plaid Cymru		Swing		

* = sitting councillor prior to the election

In 2022 the seat was retaken by Dewi Jones for Plaid Cymru. Jones beat Independent candidate Jonathon Jones by 444 votes to 231. Dewi Jones served as Mayor of Caernarfon for 2024/25.

Gwynedd Council election, 5 May 2022
Party	Candidate	Votes	%	±%
Plaid Cymru	Dewi Jones	444	66.0	
Independent	Jonathan Jones	231	34.0	
Turnout		619	43.2	
Plaid Cymru gain from Independent		Swing		

== See also ==
- List of electoral wards in Gwynedd
- Seiont (electoral ward)
