= Battle of Bron yr Erw =

Battle fought in Llŷn, Wales in 1075

The Battle of Bron yr Erw was fought at Clynnog Fawr, Wales, in 1075.

In 1075 the battle of Bron-yr-erw took place between Gruffydd ap Cynan and Trahaearn ap Caradog. Source: Thomas Jones, The Chronicle of the Princes, 1955, p.29. Gruffydd ap Cynan fought a battle at Bron yr Erw, near Clynnog, in 1075, which turned out disastrously for him and drove him back as an exile to Ireland, the land of his birth. Source: Cambridge County Histories: Carnarvonshire, 1911; p. 89. The battle is mentioned in J.E.Lloyd, A History of Wales, vol II, 1912, pp. 380 & 383. B.A.Malaws, RCAHMW, 23 May 2006.

== Sources ==
- Ashley, Mike (2012). The Mammoth Book of British Kings and Queens. Constable & Robinson Limited. p. 344. ISBN 978-1-4721-0113-6.
