= Arllechwedd (electoral ward) =

Arllechwedd is an electoral ward in Gwynedd, Wales. It lies east of the city of Bangor and is the most northeasterly ward in Gwynedd, bordering Conwy County Borough. Arllechwedd ward includes the villages of Llandegai, Llanllechid, Tal-y-bont and Abergwyngregyn. It elects a councillor to Gwynedd Council.

The total population according to the 2011 Census, was 1,398.

== Election results ==
In May 2017 Arllechwedd was one of 92 wards in Wales which did not hold an election because the sitting councillor was unopposed. It has been represented by Plaid Cymru councillor Dafydd Meurig, since a by-election on 16 June 2011.

Gwynedd Council by-election, 16 June 2011
Party	Candidate	Votes	%	±%
Plaid Cymru	Meurig, Dafydd	255	56.04	
Liberal Democrats	Douglas-Pennant, Edmond Hugh	93	20.44	
Labour	Edwards, David Gwynfor	72	15.82	
Conservative	Lewis, Jennie	35	7.69	

== Demographics ==
=== Languages ===
According to the United Kingdom Census 2021, 57.8 per cent of all usual residents aged 3+ in Arllechwedd can speak Welsh. 69.2 per cent of the population noted that they could speak, read, write or understand Welsh. The 2011 census noted 61.9 per cent of all usual residents aged 3 years and older in the village could speak Welsh.

== See also ==
- List of electoral wards in Gwynedd
