= Glyder (electoral ward) =

Coordinates: 53.219°N 4.152°W

- Electoral ward
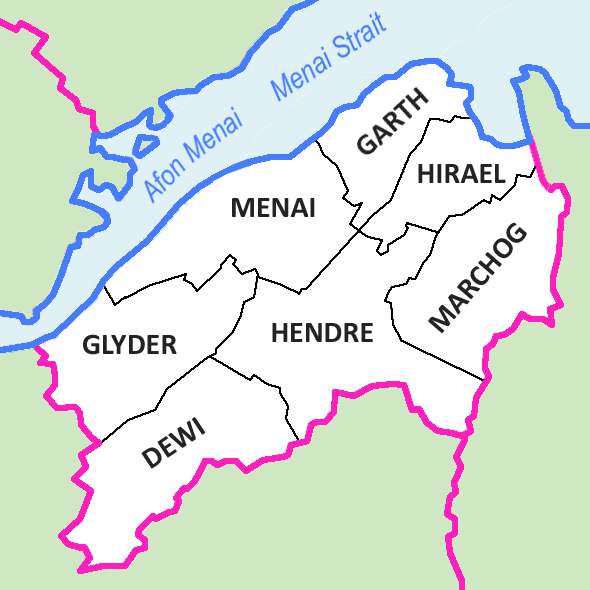
- Electoral wards in Bangor since 2022
- Population: 1,777 (2011 census)
- Community: Bangor
- Principal area: Gwynedd
- Country: Wales
- Sovereign state: United Kingdom
- Post town: BANGOR
- Postcode district: LL57
- Dialling code: 01248
- UK Parliament: Bangor Aberconwy
- Senedd Cymru – Welsh Parliament: Arfon
- Councillors: 1 (County); 3 (City Council)

Glyder is an electoral ward in the city of Bangor, Gwynedd, Wales, electing councillors to the city council and Gwynedd Council.

== Description ==
The ward covers the western corner of the city on the Menai Strait, including three schools and several college campuses. In the westernmost corner of the ward is the Menai Suspension Bridge to Anglesey. The ward is partially bounded to the northwest by the A5 road, to the southeast by the Penrhos Road. Bangor University's Neuadd Reichel building is in the very northernmost corner.

The ward population, according to the 2011 census, was 1,777.

== City ward ==
Glyder is a ward to Bangor City Council electing three of the twenty city councillors.

== County ward ==
Glyder has been an electoral ward to Gwynedd Council since 1995, electing one county councillor. At the 1995 and 1999 elections the ward was represented by an Independent. Since 2004 it has been represented by Plaid Cymru.

At a by-election in May 2011, Plaid Cymru only narrowly won the contest from the Liberal Democrats, by 13 votes. In the May 2012 county council election Plaid's Elin Walker Jones retained the seat with an increased 32 vote majority over the Lib Dems. In the 2022 Elections Plaid Cymru retained the Glyder ward with Plaid Cymru’s Elin Walker-Jones with 87.0% of the turnover at 467 votes, beating Independent Steven Bell with 13% of the turnover at 70 votes, a majority of 397 votes for Elin Walker-Jones.

== See also ==
- List of electoral wards in Gwynedd
- Deiniol (electoral ward)
- Hendre (Bangor electoral ward)
