= Menai (Caernarfon ward) =

Coordinates: 53.151°N 4.260°W

- Electoral ward
- Location within Gwynedd
- Population: 2,196 (2011 census)
- Community: Caernarfon
- Principal area: Gwynedd
- Country: Wales
- Sovereign state: United Kingdom
- Post town: CAERNARFON
- Postcode district: LL55
- Dialling code: 01286
- UK Parliament: Dwyfor Meirionnydd
- Senedd Cymru – Welsh Parliament: Arfon
- Councillors: 1 (County); 4 (Town Council)

Menai is an electoral ward in the town of Caernarfon, Gwynedd, Wales. As the name suggests, it borders the Menai Strait. The ward elects councillors to the town council and Gwynedd Council.

== Description ==
The Menai ward covers the northwest part of the community, including Caernarfon town centre north of the High Street. It is bordered to the east by the B4366 Bethel Road. The Caernarfon ward of Cadnant lies to the east.

The ward population, according to the 2011 Census, was 2,196.

== Town ward ==
Menai is an electoral ward to Caernarfon Town Council electing four of the seventeen town councillors.

== District ward ==
Menai (Caernarfon) was a ward to Arfon Borough Council (abolished 1996), electing two councillors at the 1987 and 1991 elections.

== Gwynedd county ward ==
Menai (Caernarfon) has been an electoral ward to Gwynedd Council since 1995, electing two county councillors at the 1995 and 1999 elections. From the 2004 elections the representation reduced to one county councillor.

== See also ==
- List of electoral wards in Gwynedd
