= 2012 Gwynedd Council election =

2012 UK local government election

Results of the 2012 Gwynedd Council election

The 2012 Gwynedd County Council election took place on 3 May 2012 to elect members of Gwynedd Council in Wales. Seventy four council seats were up for re-election, however, no candidates were nominated for the Bryncrug/Llanfihangel ward, and a by-election was held in June 2012.

The Gwynedd election was on the same day as other 2012 United Kingdom local elections.

== Results ==
The council shifted from Plaid Cymru majority to No Overall Control (Plaid had taken control of the council between elections). With no candidates nominated for the Bryncrug/Llanfihangel ward, a by-election was held in June 2012 and the outcome could have led to a Plaid majority had the Plaid candidate won. However, an independent won. Plaid remained holding exactly half of the total seats, per the table below:

Gwynedd Council election 2012
Party	Seats	Gains	Losses	Net gain/loss	Seats %	Votes %	Votes	+/−
Plaid Cymru	37			▲2	50.0	43.4	13,426	▲3.4
Llais Gwynedd	13			0	17.6	23.7	7,326	▲2.4
Independent	19			▲1	25.7	19.4	5,996	▼5.6
Labour	4			0	5.4	9.8	2,678	▲2.4
Liberal Democrats	2			▼3	2.7	1.9	578	▼2.6
Conservative	0			0	0.0	1.3	405	▼0.1
Socialist Labour	0			0	0.0	0.6	175	New
Green	-	-	-	0	-	-	-	▼0.4
