= Hendre (Bangor electoral ward) =

Electoral division in Gwynedd, Wales

Coordinates: 53.218°N 4.133°W

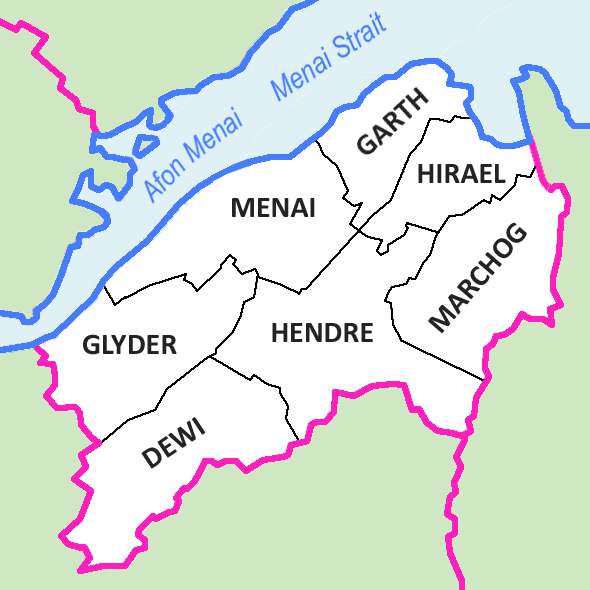
Electoral wards in Bangor

Hendre is one of eight electoral wards in the city of Bangor, Gwynedd, Wales. The ward covers part of the city south of the city centre, including West End and Glan Adda. It elects three councillors to Bangor City Council and one county councillor to Gwynedd Council.

The ward population, according to the 2011 Census, was 1,496.

== County council ward ==
Hendre has been an electoral ward to Gwynedd Council since 1995, electing one county councillor. The 1995, 1999 and 2004 elections were won by the Labour Party. Plaid Cymru's John Wynn Jones won in 2008 and 2012.

In the May 2017 county council election the result was a dead heat between the Plaid Cymru candidate, John Wynn Jones and Independent candidate, Richard Hughes. Each candidate had received 132 votes. The returning officer 'drew lots' by pulling a name from a pot, resulting in Hughes winning the seat.

Gwynedd Council election, 4 May 2017
Party	Candidate	Votes	%	±%
Independent	Hughes, Richard Medwyn	133	41.05	
Plaid Cymru	Jones, John Wynn *	132	40.74	
Labour	Sharratt, Ade	59	18.21	

* = sitting councillor prior to the election

A 2018 report by the Boundary Commission for Wales suggested a merger of Hendre with neighbouring areas to form a new two-member ward. Low voter registration of the university students was blamed for the small electorates in the city. Eventually the neighbouring Deiniol ward was split and part merged with Hendre, with Hendre's representation on the city council increased to three councillors from the 2022 elections.

== See also ==
- List of electoral wards in Gwynedd
