= Clynnog Fawr =

Village and community in Wales

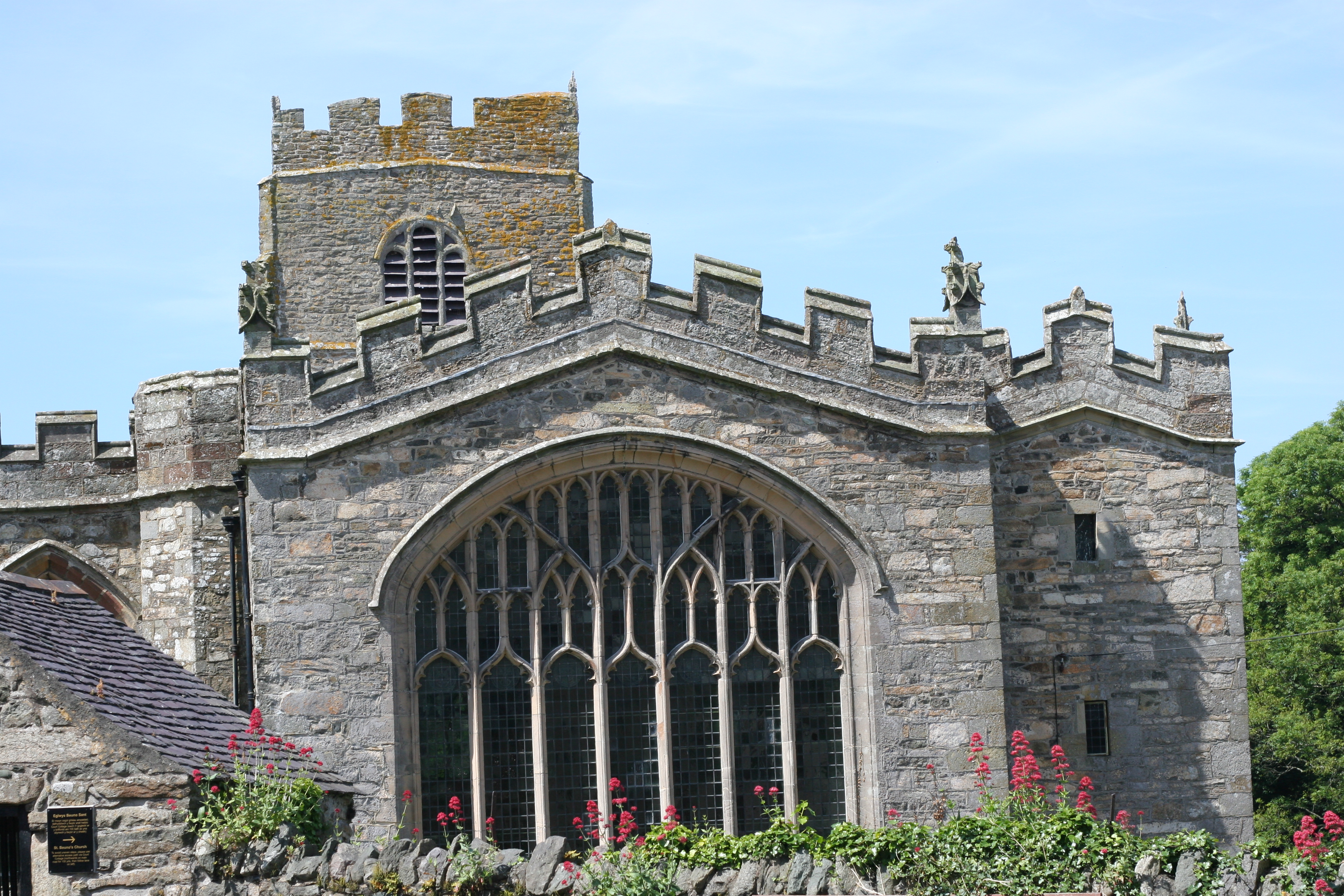
- St Beuno's Church, Clynnog Fawr

- Location within Gwynedd
- Population: 997 (2011)
- OS grid reference: SH414496
- Community: Clynnog
- Principal area: Gwynedd
- Country: Wales
- Sovereign state: United Kingdom
- Post town: CAERNARFON
- Postcode district: LL54
- Dialling code: 01286
- Police: North Wales
- Fire: North Wales
- Ambulance: Welsh
- UK Parliament: Dwyfor Meirionnydd
- Senedd Cymru – Welsh Parliament: Gwynedd Maldwyn
- List of places UK Wales Gwynedd 53.020°N 4.364°W Map of the community

Clynnog Fawr, often simply called Clynnog, is a village and community on the north coast of Llŷn Peninsula in Gwynedd, north-west Wales. It is in the historic county of Caernarfonshire. The community includes Pant Glas.

Clynnog Fawr lies on the A499 road between Caernarfon and Pwllheli, at grid reference SH415500, between the coast and a mountainous area including Bwlch Mawr. It had a population of 130 in 1991, which had increased to 997 at the 2011 Census. The community covers an area of 4,551 hectares (17.57 mi^{2}). The main feature of the village is St Beuno's Church, which is much larger than would be expected in a village of Clynnog's size. The site is said to be that of a Celtic monastery founded by Beuno in the early 7th century. Clynnog means 'the place of the holly-trees': compare Breton Quelneuc (Kelenneg), Gaelic Cuilneach. In Middle Welsh, its name was Celynnog. It developed into an important foundation and some Welsh law manuscripts specify that the Abbot of Clynnog was entitled to a seat at the court of the king of Gwynedd.

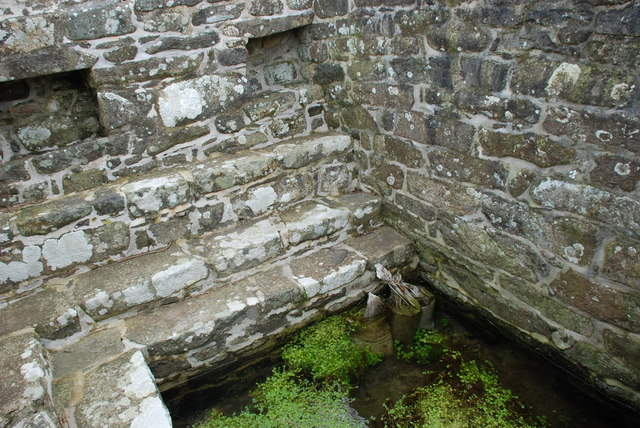
St Beuno's Well

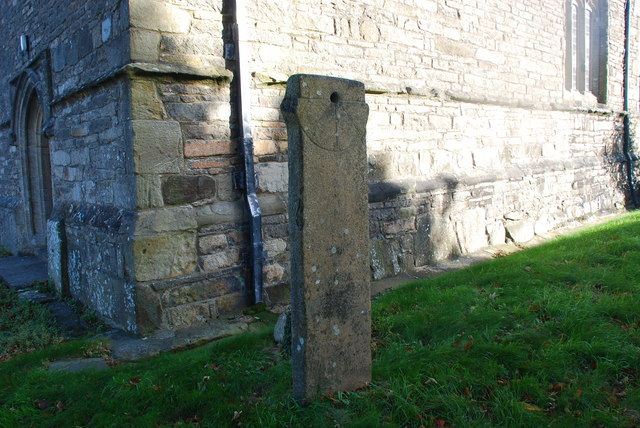
The church's freestanding tide dial

The church is recorded as having been burnt in 978 by the Vikings and later burnt again by the Normans. By the end of the 15th century it was a collegiate church, one of only six in Wales. The church was an important stopping place for pilgrims heading for Bardsey Island and contains Cyff Beuno, an ancient wooden chest hollowed out of a single piece of ash and used to keep alms given by the pilgrims. Maen Beuno or "Beuno's Stone" has markings reputed to be those of Beuno's fingers. Outside in the churchyard there is a canonical sundial dated between the late 10th century and the early 12th century. Ffynnon Beuno (St Beuno's Well) is a Grade II* listed structure at the south-west end of the village.

The church is a major location on the North Wales Pilgrims Way. The church is open from 10am to 5pm every day from Easter to October.

The area has been the site of a number of battles, including the Battle of Bron yr Erw in 1075 when Gruffudd ap Cynan's first bid to become king of Gwynedd was defeated by Trahaearn ap Caradog, and the Battle of Bryn Derwin in 1255 when Llywelyn ap Gruffudd defeated his brothers Owain and Dafydd to become sole ruler of Gwynedd.

== Modern era ==
Clynog Golf Club (now defunct) appeared only briefly after World War I. It had disappeared by the mid-1920s.

Clynnog's population was 997, according to the 2011 census; this was a 15.9% increase since the 860 people noted in 2001.

The 2011 census showed 73.2% of the population could speak Welsh, a rise from 67.2% in 2001.

The Clynnog electoral ward elects one councillor to sit on Gwynedd Council. Clynnog is covered by a Neighbourhood Policing Team based in the nearby village of Penygroes.

== Notable people ==
- Morus Clynnog (ca. 1525 - 1581), Welsh Roman Catholic priest and recusant exile.
- St. John Jones (ca. 1530 - 1598), a Franciscan friar, Roman Catholic priest, and martyr.
- Ebenezer Thomas (1802–1863), a Welsh teacher and poet, bardic name of Eben Fardd, moved to the village in 1827, where he lived opposite the church.
