= Gwynedd Council =

Local government authority in north-west Wales

Gwynedd Council Cyngor Gwynedd

Type
- Type: Principal council of Gwynedd

Leadership
- Chair: Elin Walker Jones, Plaid Cymru since 14 May 2026
- Leader: Nia Wyn Jeffreys, Plaid Cymru since 5 December 2024
- Chief Executive: Dafydd Gibbard since May 2021

Structure
- Seats: 69 councillors
- Graph of the party split among 69 seats.
- Political groups: Administration (44) Plaid Cymru (44) Other parties (25) Labour (1) Liberal Democrats (1) Independent (23)
- Length of term: 5 years

Elections
- Voting system: First-past-the-post
- Last election: 5 May 2022
- Next election: 6 May 2027

Meeting place
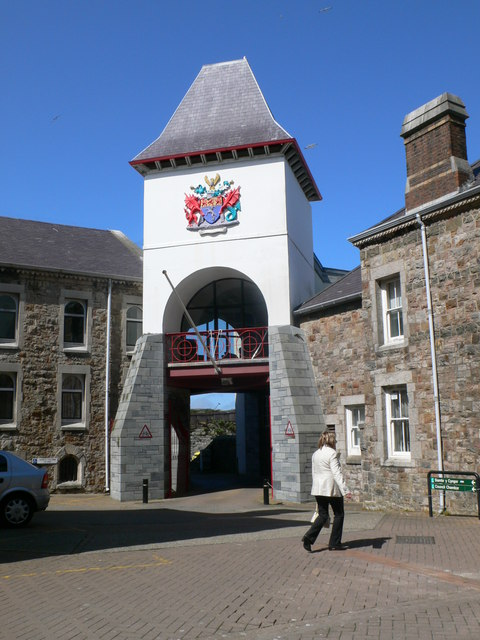
- Council Offices, Shirehall Street, Caernarfon, LL55 1SH

Website
- www.gwynedd.llyw.cymru

Gwynedd Council, officially Cyngor Gwynedd, is the local authority for the county of Gwynedd, one of the principal areas of Wales. The council administrates internally using the Welsh language, and has used only its Welsh name since 2022.

== History ==
Previous bilingual logo for the council until 2022.

The county of Gwynedd was created in 1974 under the Local Government Act 1972, covering the area of the abolished administrative counties of Anglesey, Caernarfonshire, most of Merioneth, and a small part of Denbighshire. The new county created in 1974 was named "Gwynedd" after the medieval kingdom of Gwynedd which had covered the area until its division into counties under the Statute of Rhuddlan in 1284, following the Conquest of Wales by Edward I.

From 1974 until 1996 Gwynedd County Council served the area as an upper-tier county council, with the county also being divided into five lower-tier districts: Aberconwy, Arfon, Dwyfor, Meirionnydd, and Ynys Môn – Isle of Anglesey.

Local government across Wales was reorganised again in 1996 under the Local Government (Wales) Act 1994, which replaced the previous two tier system of counties and districts with "principal areas" (each designated either a "county" or a "county borough"), whose councils perform the functions previously divided between the county and district councils. The pre-1996 county of Gwynedd was divided between three principal areas:

- Anglesey (Welsh: Sir Ynys Môn) (a county) covering the district of Ynys Môn – Isle of Anglesey.
- Conwy County Borough covering the Aberconwy district and the neighbouring Colwyn district from Clwyd.
- "Caernarfonshire and Merionethshire" (Welsh: Sir Gaernarfon a Meirionnydd) (a county) covering the Arfon, Dwyfor, and Meirionnydd districts.

During the transition to the new system, the shadow authority elected for the latter requested a change of name from "Caernarfonshire and Merionethshire" to "Gwynedd". The government confirmed the change with effect from 2 April 1996, one day after the new council came into being.

Since 1996, Gwynedd has therefore been a single-tier principal area, covering a smaller area than the pre-1996 county of the same name. Although the principal area is designated as a county, the council had styled itself as "Gwynedd Council" rather than "Gwynedd County Council", the latter having been the style used by the pre-1996 upper-tier authority. In October 2022, the council dropped its English name, since when it has only used its Welsh name Cyngor Gwynedd.

=== Second home controversy ===
Controversy erupted in mid-winter 2001 when Seimon Glyn, Gwynedd Council's housing committee chairman and Plaid Cymru member, voiced frustration over "English immigrants" moving into traditionally Welsh speaking communities. Glyn was commenting on a report underscoring the dilemma of rocketing house prices outstripping what locals could pay, with the report warning that "...traditional Welsh communities could die out..." as a consequence.

In 2001 nearly a third of all purchases of properties in Gwynedd were by buyers from out of the county, with some communities reporting as many as a third of local homes used as holiday homes. Holiday home owners typically spend less than six months of the year in the local community.

The issue of locals being priced out of the local housing market is common to many rural communities throughout Britain, but in Wales the added dimension of language further complicates the issue, as many new residents do not learn the Welsh language.

Concerned for the Welsh language under these pressures, Glyn said "Once you have more than 50% of anybody living in a community that speaks a foreign language, then you lose your indigenous tongue almost immediately". His comments attracted strong criticism of Plaid Cymru from other national parties.

By spring 2002 both the Snowdonia National Park (Parc Cenedlaethol Eryri) and Pembrokeshire Coast National Park (Parc Cenedlaethol Arfordir Penfro) authorities began limiting second home ownership within the parks, following the example set by Exmoor. According to planners in Snowdonia and Pembroke applicants for new homes must demonstrate a proven local need or the applicant must have strong links with the area.

=== Trade embargo with Israel ===
In 2014, the council passed a motion which called for a trade embargo with Israel and was subsequently accused of Anti-Semitism by the organisation Jewish Human Rights Watch. Jewish Human Rights Watch won the right to a judicial review of council's decision, but their claim was dismissed by the High Court in June 2016.

=== Llais Gwynedd ===
In 2008, Llais Gwynedd or Voice of Gwynedd, a regionalist pressure group won several seats on Gwynedd Council. It demanded an end to cutbacks in rural areas threatening schools, a relaxation of planning controls, action to provide rural employment and calls for more to be done to protect Gwynedd's "unique cultural, linguistic and social fabric". The group was represented on the council between 2008 and the 2022 election, when it lost all its seats.

=== 2024 leader resignation ===
Council leader, Dyfrig Siencyn, tendered his resignation on 16 October 2024, after initially refusing to apologise to the abuse victims of Gwynedd headteacher, Neil Foden. Siencyn later apologised for this, but four of his cabinet members resigned over the events. Siencyn's resignation as leader of the Plaid Cymru group and, consequently, the Council, was accepted at a meeting of the Plaid Cymru group a few days later.

== Political control ==
The council has been under Plaid Cymru majority control since 2015.

The first election to the county council was held in 1973, initially operating as a shadow authority alongside the outgoing authorities before coming into its powers on 1 April 1974. A shadow authority was again elected in 1995 ahead of the reforms which came into force on 1 April 1996. Political control of the council since 1974 has been as follows:

Upper-tier county

Party in control	Years
Independent	1974–1993
No overall control	1993–1996

Principal area

Party in control	Years
Plaid Cymru	1996–2008
No overall control	2008–2011
Plaid Cymru	2011–2012
No overall control	2012–2015
Plaid Cymru	2015–present

=== Leadership ===
The leaders of the council since 1996 have been:

Councillor	Party	From	To
Alun Ffred Jones	Plaid Cymru	1996	2003
Richard Parry Hughes	Plaid Cymru	2003	May 2008
Dyfed Edwards	Plaid Cymru	22 May 2008	May 2017
Dyfrig Siencyn	Plaid Cymru	18 May 2017	16 Oct 2024
Nia Wyn Jeffreys	Plaid Cymru	5 Dec 2024	present

=== Composition ===
Following the 2022 election and subsequent by-elections and changes of allegiance up to July 2026, the composition of the council was:

Party	Seats
Plaid Cymru	44
Labour	1
Liberal Democrats	1
Independent	23
Total	69

Of the independent councillors, 21 sit together as the Independent group, and the other two are not aligned to a group. The Labour and Liberal Democrat councillors sit together as the "Gwynedd First" group. The next election is due in 2027.

== Elections ==
Since 2012, council elections have taken place every five years.

Year	Seats	Plaid Cymru	Independent	Labour	Liberal Democrats	Llais Gwynedd	Notes
1995	83	45	26	9	3	-	Plaid Cymru majority control
1999	83	44	21	12	6	-	Plaid Cymru majority control
2004	75	41	17	10	7	-	Plaid Cymru majority control. New ward boundaries.
2008	75	35	18	5	4	13	
2012	75	37	19	4	2	13	
2017	75	41	26	1	1	6	Plaid Cymru majority control
2022	69	44	23	1	1	0	Plaid Cymru majority control. New ward boundaries.

Party with the most elected councillors in bold. Coalition agreements in notes column.

A by-election for Diffwys and Maenofferen was held in July 2010 and Llais Gwynedd narrowly held the seat.

Further by-elections in the Bowydd a Rhiw, held in September 2010, and Seiont, held in October 2010, led to a Plaid Cymru gain from Llais Gwynedd and a Llais Gwynedd gain from Independent respectively.

A by-election for the vacant Arllechwedd ward was held in June 2011, resulting in a Plaid Cymru gain from the Liberal Democrats. The Glyder ward was also vacant at the same time, after the death of the Plaid Cymru councillor. Plaid Cymru held the seat in the by-election held in July 2011, allowing the party to gain full control of the council with 38 seats, one seat being vacant at the time.

By-elections held for the Diffwys a Maenofferen and Penrhyndeudraeth wards in September 2011 resulted in a gain for Plaid Cymru over Llais Gwynedd and a Plaid Cymru hold respectively. This ensured Plaid Cymru's control of the council, with no seat vacancies.

== Premises ==
The council has its main offices at the Council Offices in Caernarfon. The complex lies either side of Shirehall Street within the town walls. On the western side of the street is the former Caernarvon Gaol, built in 1869 as the county prison for Caernarfonshire. After it closed as a prison in 1921 the building was converted to become offices for the old Caernarfonshire County Council, transferring to the new Gwynedd County Council in 1974. At the northern end of the former prison buildings is an extension built in 1984 comprising a council chamber and archway linking it back to the former prison building, with the council's coat of arms prominently displayed above the archway. The council chamber itself is now called Siambr Dafydd Orwig after Dafydd Orwig, an advocate of the Welsh language and bilingual education in Wales who was a long-standing member of the county council. He died in 1996 whilst serving as chairman of the council. Prior to the construction of the new council chamber in 1984, the council had met at County Hall.

On the opposite eastern side of Shirehall Street, extending through to Castle Street, is a modern office building built in the 1980s which houses many of the council's departments. The council also maintains area offices at the former Dwyfor District Council offices in Pwllheli and at Cae Penarlâg in Dolgellau, which had been built in 1953 for the old Merioneth County Council and subsequently served as the headquarters of Meirionnydd District Council until the 1996 reorganisation.

== Electoral divisions, areas and committees ==
The council operates a decentralised system of administration, with three area committees:

- Arfon
- Dwyfor
- Meirionnydd

=== Electoral divisions ===
Pre-2022 electoral divisions in Gwynedd

Between 2004 and 2022 the county borough was divided into 71 electoral wards returning 75 councillors.

Following a boundary review and The County of Gwynedd (Electoral Arrangements) Order 2021 the number of wards was reduced to 65, electing 69 councillors, taking effect from the 2022 elections. All wards now use the Welsh name as the official name in Welsh and English. Twenty-seven wards remained unchanged. There are a number of elected community councils. Communities with a community council are indicated with a '* ':

==== County wards 2022– ====
Ward	County Coun cillors	Communities (and community wards) included
Aberdyfi	1	Aberdyfi*; Pennal*
Abererch	1	Llannor* (Abererch and Y Ffôr wards)
Abermaw	1	Barmouth*
Abersoch gyda Llanengan	1	Llanengan* (Abersoch and Llanengan wards)
Arllechwedd	1	Aber and Llanllechid*; Llandygai* (Llandygai ward); Pentir (Glasinfryn ward)
Bethel a’r Felinheli	2	Y Felinheli*; Llanddeiniolen* (Bethel ward)
Bowydd a’r Rhiw	1	Ffestiniog* (Bowydd and Rhiw and Tanygrisiau wards)
Brithdir and Llanfachreth/Y Ganllwyd/Llanelltyd	1	Brithdir and Llanfachreth*; Ganllwyd*; Llanelltyd*
Bro Dysynni	1	Bryn-crug*; Llanegryn*; Llanfihangel-y-Pennant*
Cadnant	1	Caernarfon* (Cadnant ward)
Canol Bangor	2	Bangor* (Garth, Hendre and Menai wards)
Canol Bethesda	1	Bethesda* (Ogwen ward)
Canol Tref Caernarfon	1	Caernarfon* (Canol Tref ward)
Clynnog Fawr	1	Clynnog*; Llanllyfni* (Nebo ward)
Corris a Mawddwy	1	Corris*; Mawddwy*
Cricieth	1	Criccieth*
Cwm y Glo	1	Llanddeiniolen* (Brynrefail ward); Llanrug* (Ceunant and Cwm y Glo wards)
De Dolgellau	1	Dolgellau* (Southern ward)
De Pwllheli	1	Pwllheli* (South ward)
Deiniolen	1	Llanddeiniolen* (Clwt y Bont, Deiniolen and Dinorwig wards)
Dewi	1	Bangor* (Dewi ward)
Diffwys and Maenofferen	1	Ffestiniog* (Diffwys and Maenofferen ward)
Dolbenmaen	1	Dolbenmaen* (Bryncir, Garn, Golan, Penmorfa and Treflys wards)
Dwyrain Bangor	2	Bangor* (Hirael and Marchog wards)
Dwyrain Porthmadog	1	Porthmadog* (East and Ynys Galch wards)
Dyffryn Ardudwy	1	Dyffryn Ardudwy*
Efailnewydd a Buan	1	Buan*; Llannor* (Efail-newydd and Pentre-uchaf wards)
Gerlan	1	Bethesda* (Gerlan and Rachub wards)
Glaslyn	1	Beddgelert*; Llanfrothen*; Dolbenmaen* (Pren-teg ward); Porthmadog* (Tremadog ward)
Glyder	1	Bangor* (Glyder ward)
Gogledd Dolgellau	1	Dolgellau* (Northern ward)
Gogledd Pwllheli	1	Pwllheli* (North ward)
Gorllewin Porthmadog	1	Porthmadog* (Gest, Morfa Bychan and West wards)
Gorllewin Tywyn	1	Tywyn* (East and West wards)
Harlech a Llanbedr	1	Harlech*; Llanbedr*; Llanfair*; Talsarnau*
Llanbedrog gyda Mynytho	1	Llanbedrog*; Llanengan* (Llangian ward)
Llanberis	1	Llanberis*
Llandderfel	1	Llandderfel*; Llangywer*
Llangelynin	1	Arthog*; Llanegryn*; Llangelynin*
Llanllyfni	1	Llanllyfni* (Llanllyfni, Nantlle and Talysarn wards)
Llanrug	1	Llanrug* (Llanrug ward)
Llanwchllyn	1	Llanwchllyn*; Llanycil*
Llanwnda	1	Llanwnda* (Dinas and Rhostryfan wards)
Llanystumdwy	1	Llanystumdwy*
Menai (Caernarfon)	1	Caernarfon* (Menai ward)
Morfa Nefyn a Thudweiliog	1	Nefyn* (Edern and Morfa Nefyn wards); Tudweiliog*
Morfa Tywyn	1	Tywyn* (Morfa ward)
Nefyn	1	Nefyn (town)* (Nefyn ward)
Peblig	1	Caernarfon* (Deheuol ward)
Pen draw Llŷn	1	Aberdaron*; Botwnnog*
Penisa’r-waun	1	Llanddeiniolen* (Penisarwaun and Rhiwlas wards)
Penrhyndeudraeth	1	Penrhyndeudraeth*
Pen-y-groes	1	Llanllyfni* (Penygroes ward)
Teigl	1	Ffestiniog* (Conglywal and Cynfal and Teigl wards)
Trawsfynydd	1	Maentwrog*; Trawsfynydd*
Tre-garth a Mynydd Llandygái	1	Llandygai* (St Ann's and Tregarth wards)
Tryfan	1	Llandwrog* (Carmel and Cesarea wards); Llanwnda* (Rhosgadfan ward)
Waunfawr	1	Betws Garmon*; Waunfawr (Waunfawr ward)
Y Bala	1	Bala*
Y Bontnewydd	1	Bontnewydd*; Waunfawr (Caeathro ward)
Y Faenol	1	Pentir* (Vaynol ward)
Y Groeslon	1	Llandwrog* (Dinas Dinlle and Groeslon wards)
Yr Eifl	1	Llanaelhaearn*; Pistyll*

* = Communities which elect a community council
