= Llais Gwynedd =

Regionalist political party in Wales

- Leader: Owain Williams
- Founded: 2008
- Dissolved: 2021
- Ideology: Gwynedd regionalism
- Colours: Red, white, green
- Gwynedd Council: 0 / 75

Website
- Official website

Llais Gwynedd (Welsh for 'voice of Gwynedd', pronounced [ɬais ˈɡuɨ̯nɛð]) was a small regionalist political party based in Gwynedd in North Wales. The party formed following the Plaid Cymru executive's proposal to more than halve the number of primary schools in Gwynedd by closing rural schools. Many of the party's members were former members of Plaid Cymru. The campaign was founded as Llais y Bobl, or "People's Voice", but the name was changed because of another party by that name in Blaenau Gwent. It deregistered in 2021.

== Electoral history ==
The party won twelve seats on Gwynedd Council in the 2008 UK Local Elections, ending overall control of the council by Plaid Cymru. They won seven seats in Dwyfor, three in Meirionnydd and two in Arfon. Llais Gwynedd won another seat in Blaenau Ffestiniog in June (the poll had been postponed due to the death of the Labour candidate) giving them a total of 13 seats on Gwynedd Council. They declined to form a coalition with Plaid. They tried to gain the post of chair of the Children and Young Persons Committee, but Labour councillors voted with Plaid.

Gwilym Euros Roberts, a Llais Gwynedd councillor, was due to stand against the National Assembly of Wales presiding officer Lord Dafydd Elis-Thomas in 2011 in the Welsh Assembly constituency of Dwyfor Meirionnydd. However, in July 2010 Roberts was jailed for four and a half years at Caernarfon Crown Court for wounding his wife with intent; he had stood down from his post that May.

Llais Gwynedd held the Diffwys and Maenofferen ward in the by-election on 15 July 2010. Their candidate Richard Owen Lloyd Jones won by 185 votes to 181 for Plaid. Llais Gwynedd gained a further council seat at the Seiont by-election on 7 October 2010.

In the 2011 National Assembly for Wales election, the party fielded Louise Hughes as their candidate in Dwyfor Meirionnydd. She received 3,225 votes or 15.5% of the vote, taking most of her support from the Plaid Cymru candidate.

In 2011, despite moderate success in the National Assembly Elections in Dwyfor Meirionnydd, Llais Gwynedd failed to produce a candidate for Arfon. They also lost the second Diffwys and Maenofferen by-election to Plaid Cymru, and failed to field candidates in other by-elections, which allowed their main rivals, Plaid Cymru, to regain their majority on Gwynedd County Council. In February 2012, Councillor Chris Hughes (who had beaten Dafydd Iwan in the 2008 local government elections) left the Llais Gwynedd group and joined Plaid Cymru.

In the May 2012 council elections, Llais Gwynedd returned 13 councillors on Gwynedd Council and held the balance of power in the council chamber. The defection of three Llais Gwynedd councillors from Dwyfor to Plaid Cymru in May 2015 returned control to Plaid Cymru.

In 2017 the party won seven seats, but was deregistered in 2021 and blamed the COVID pandemic. Although 11 party members stood for election in May 2022, winning four, they did not run under the Llais Gwynedd name and sat as independents.

The party deregistered in 2021.

=== Electoral performance ===
==== Senedd elections ====
Year	Regional Vote			Constituency Vote			Overall Seats	Change
2011	–	–	0 / 20	3,225 votes	0.3%	0 / 40	0 / 60	New Party
2021	–	–	0 / 20	1,136 votes	0.1%	0 / 40	0 / 60	Steady

== Policies ==
According to the party's 2008 online manifesto their key policies are:

- Gwynedd has particular needs which were not being met by the Plaid Cymru governing council of Gwynedd
- Stop school closures unless there is a consensus within a particular locality in support of such a measure
- Stop local people being sent for specialist care out of Gwynedd
- Opposes the North West Wales Spatial Development Strategy which focused most investment in Gwynedd on the Menai coastal strip
- Supports tourism, but is opposed to the sort of tourism which has a negative impact on "Gwynedd's unique social, linguistic and cultural fabric"
- Create local employment to stop young people leaving Gwynedd to look for work elsewhere
- In favour of removing restrictions on housing developments to allow local people to build on their own land
- Enthusiastically supports the Welsh language
- Proposes extra measures to protect Welsh-speaking rural communities in Gwynedd
