= List of electoral wards in Wales =

This article is a list of electoral wards in Wales. Electoral wards are the main electoral units used for elections to Wales' principal area councils. They may also elect representatives to community councils, where these exist. Listed here by (post-1974) preserved counties and subdivided by (post-1996) unitary authorities of Wales.

For those electoral divisions in England, see List of electoral wards in England by constituency.

== Preserved counties ==
=== Clwyd ===
==== Conwy County Borough ====
Since 1995 for elections to Conwy County Borough Council: Abergele Pensarn, Betws-y-Coed, Betws yn Rhos, Bryn, Caerhun, Colwyn, Conwy, Craig-y-Don, Crwst, Deganwy, Eglwysbach, Eirias, Gele, Glyn, Gogarth, Gower, Kinmel Bay, Llanddulas, Llandrillo yn Rhos, Llangernyw, Llansanffraid, Llansannan, Llysfaen, Marl, Mochdre, Mostyn, Pandy, Pant-yr-afon/Penmaenan, Penrhyn, Pensarn, Pentre Mawr, Rhiw, Towyn, Trefriw, Tudno, Uwchaled, Uwch Conwy.

Since 2022 for elections to Conwy County Borough Council: Betws-y-Coed and Trefriw, Betws yn Rhos, Bryn, Caerhun, Colwyn, Conwy, Craig-y-Don, Deganwy, Eglwys-bach a Llangernyw, Eirias, Gele and Llanddulas, Glyn, Glyn y Marl, Gogarth Mostyn, Kinmel Bay, Llandrillo yn Rhos, Llanrwst a Llanddoged, Llansanffraid, Llansannan, Llysfaen, Mochdre, Pandy, Penmaenmawr, Penrhyn, Pen-sarn Pentre Mawr, Rhiw, Towyn, Tudno, Uwch Aled, Uwch Conwy.

==== Denbighshire ====
Since 1995 for elections to Denbighshire County Council: Bodelwyddan, Corwen, Denbigh Central, Denbigh Lower, Denbigh Upper/Henllan, Dyserth, Efenechtyd, Llanarmon-yn-Ial/Llandegla, Llanbedr Dyffryn Clwyd/Llangynhafal, Llanfair Dyffryn Clwyd/Gwyddelwern, Llandrillo, Llangollen, Llandyrnog, Llanrhaeadr-yng-Nghinmeirch, Prestatyn Central, Prestatyn East, Prestatyn Meliden, Prestatyn North, Prestatyn South West, Rhuddlan, Rhyl East, Rhyl South, Rhyl South East, Rhyl South West, Rhyl West, Ruthin, St Asaph East, St Asaph West, Trefnant, Tremeirchion.

==== Flintshire ====
Since 1995 for elections to Flintshire County Council: Argoed, Aston, Bagillt East, Bagillt West, Broughton North East, Broughton South, Brynford, Buckley Bistre East, Buckley Bistre West, Buckley Mountain, Buckley Pentrobin, Caergwrle, Caerwys, Cilcain, Connah's Quay Central, Connah's Quay Golftyn, Connah's Quay South, Connah's Quay Wepre, Ewloe, Ffynnongroyw, Flint Castle, Flint Coleshill, Flint Oakenholt, Flint Trelawney, Greenfield, Gronant, Gwernaffield, Gwernymynydd, Halkyn, Hawarden, Higher Kinnerton, Holywell Central, Holywell East, Holywell West, Hope, Leeswood, Llanfynydd, Mancot, Mold Broncoed, Mold East, Mold South, Mold West, Mostyn, New Brighton, Northop, Northop Hall, Penyffordd, Queensferry, Saltney Mold Junction, Saltney Stonebridge, Sealand, Shotton East, Shotton Higher, Shotton West, Trelawnyd and Gwaenysgor, Treuddyn, Whitford.

==== Wrexham ====
There have been two sets of wards since the county borough's first election in 1995. The second set since 2022 has been: Acrefair North, Acton and Maesydre, Bangor Is-y-Coed, Borras Park, Bronington and Hanmer, Brymbo, Bryn Cefn, Brynyffynnon, Cartrefle, Cefn East, Cefn West, Chirk North, Chirk South, Coedpoeth, Dyffryn Ceiriog, Erddig, Esclusham, Garden Village, Gresford East and West, Grosvenor, Gwenfro, Gwersyllt East, Gwersyllt North, Gwersyllt South, Gwersyllt West, Hermitage, Holt, Little Acton, Llangollen Rural, Llay, Marchwiel, Marford and Hoseley, Minera, New Broughton, Offa, Overton and Maelor South, Pant and Johnstown, Penycae, Penycae and Ruabon South, Ponciau, Queensway, Rhos, Rhosnesni, Rossett, Ruabon, Smithfield, Stansty, Whitegate, Wynnstay

=== Dyfed ===
==== Carmarthenshire ====
Since 1995 for elections to Carmarthenshire County Council: Abergwili, Ammanford, Betws, Bigyn (Llanelli), Burry Port, Bynea, Carmarthen Town North, Carmarthen Town South, Carmarthen Town West, Cenarth, Cilycwm, Cynwyl Elfed, Cynwyl Gaeo, Dafen, Elli (Llanelli), Felinfoel, Garnant, Glanamman, Glanymor (Llanelli), Glyn, Gorslas, Hendy, Hengoed, Kidwelly, Laugharne Township, Llanboidy, Llanddarog, Llandeilo, Llandovery, Llandybie, Llanegwad, Llanfihangel Aberbythych, Llanfihangel-ar-Arth, Llangadog, Llangeler, Llangennech, Llangunnor, Llangyndeyrn, Llannon, Llansteffan, Llanybydder, Lliedi (Llanelli), Llwynhendy, Manordeilo and Salem, Pembrey, Penygroes, Pontamman, Pontyberem, Quarter Bach, St Clears, St Ishmael, Saron, Swiss Valley, Trelech, Trimsaran, Tycroes, Tyisha (Llanelli), Whitland.

==== Ceredigion ====
Since 1995 for elections to Ceredigion County Council: Aberaeron, Aberporth, Aberystwyth Bronglais, Aberystwyth Central, Aberystwyth North, Aberystwyth Penparcau, Aberystwyth Rheidol, Beulah, Borth, Capel Dewi, Cardigan Mwldan, Cardigan Rhyd-y-Fuwch, Cardigan Teifi, Ceulanamaesmawr, Ciliau Aeron, Faenor, Lampeter, Llanarth, Llanbadarn Fawr – Padarn, Llanbadarn Fawr – Sulien, Llandyfriog, Llandysilio-gogo, Llandysul Town, Llanfarian, Llanfihangel Ystrad, Llangeitho, Llangybi, Llanrhystyd, Llansantffraed, Llanwenog, Lledrod, Melindwr, New Quay, Penbryn, Pen-parc, Tirymynach, Trefeurig, Tregaron, Troedyraur, Ystwyth.

==== Pembrokeshire ====
Since 1995 for elections to Pembrokeshire County Council: Amroth, Burton, Camrose, Carew, Cilgerran, Clydau, Crymych, Dinas Cross, East Williamston, Fishguard North East, Fishguard North West, Goodwick, Haverfordwest: Castle, Haverfordwest: Garth, Haverfordwest: Portfield, Haverfordwest: Prendergast, Haverfordwest: Priory, Hundleton, Kilgetty/Begelly, Johnston, Lampeter Velfrey, Lamphey, Letterston, Llangwm, Llanrhian, Maenclochog, Manorbier, Martletwy, Merlin's Bridge, Milford: Central, Milford: East, Milford: Hakin, Milford: Hubberston, Milford: North, Milford: West, Narberth, Narberth Rural, Newport, Neyland: East, Neyland: West, Pembroke Dock Central, Pembroke Dock Llanion, Pembroke Dock Market, Pembroke Dock Pennar, Pembroke Monkton, Pembroke St Mary North, Pembroke St Mary South, Pembroke St Michael, Penally, Rudbaxton, St David's, St Dogmaels, St Ishmael's, Saundersfoot, Scleddau, Solva, Tenby North, Tenby South, The Havens, Wiston.

=== Gwent ===
==== Blaenau Gwent ====
Since 1995 for elections to Blaenau Gwent County Borough Council: Abertillery, Badminton, Beaufort, Blaina, Brynmawr, Cwm, Cwmtillery, Ebbw Vale North, Ebbw Vale South, Georgetown, Llanhilleth, Nantyglo, Rassau, Sirhowy, Six Bells, Tredegar Central and West.

==== Caerphilly ====
Since 1995 for elections to Caerphilly County Borough Council: Aberbargoed, Abercarn, Aber Valley, Argoed, Bargoed, Bedwas, Blackwood, Cefn Fforest, Crosskeys, Crumlin, Darran Valley, Gilfach, Hengoed, Llanbradach, Maesycwmmer, Morgan Jones, Moriah, Nelson, Newbridge, New Tredegar, Pengam, Penmaen, Penyrheol, Pontllanfraith, Pontlottyn, Risca East, Risca West, St Cattwg, St James, St Martins, Trethomas and Machen, Twyn Carno, Ynysddu, Ystrad Mynach.

==== Monmouthshire ====
Since 1995 for elections to Monmouthshire County Council: Caerwent, Caldicot Castle (Caldicot), Cantref (Abergavenny), Castle (Abergavenny), Croesonen (Abergavenny), Crucorney, Devauden, Dewstow (Caldicot), Dixton with Osbaston (Monmouth), Drybridge (Monmouth), Goetre Fawr, Green Lane (Caldicot), Grofield (Abergavenny), Lansdown (Abergavenny), Larkfield (Chepstow), Llanbadoc, Llanelly Hill, Llanfoist Fawr, Llangybi Fawr, Llanover, Llantilio Crossenny, Llanwenarth Ultra, Mardy, Mill (Magor with Undy), Mitchel Troy, Overmonnow (Monmouth), Portskewett, Priory (Abergavenny), Raglan, Rogiet, St Arvans, St Christopher's (Chepstow), St Kingsmark (Chepstow), St Mary's (Chepstow), Severn (Caldicot), Shirenewton, The Elms (Magor with Undy), Thornwell (Chepstow), Trellech United, Usk, West End (Caldicot), Wyesham (Monmouth).

==== Newport ====
For elections to Newport City Council: Allt-yr-yn, Alway, Beechwood, Bettws, Bishton and Langstone, Caerleon, Gaer, Graig, Lliswerry, Llanwern, Malpas, Pillgwenlly, Ringland, Rogerstone East, Rogerstone North, Rogerstone West, Shaftesbury, St Julians, Stow Hill, Tredegar Park and Marshfield, Victoria.

==== Torfaen ====
Since 1995 for elections to Torfaen County Borough Council: Abersychan, Blaenavon, Brynwern, Coed Eva, Croesyceiliog North, Croesyceiliog South, Cwmyniscoy, Fairwater, Greenmeadow, Llantarnam, Llanyrafon North, Llanyrafon South, New Inn, Panteg, Pontnewydd, Pontnewynydd, Pontypool, St Cadocs and Penygarn, St Dials, Snatchwood, Trevethin, Two Locks, Upper Cwmbran, Wainfelin.

Since 2022 for elections to Torfaen County Borough Council: Abersychan, Blaenavon, Coed Eva, Croesyceiliog, Cwmynyscoy, Fairwater, Greenmeadow, Llanfrechfa and Ponthir, Llantarnam, Llanyrafon, New Inn, Panteg, Pontnewydd, Pontnewynydd and Snatchwood, Pontypool Fawr, St Dials, Trevethin and Penygarn, Two Locks, Upper Cwmbran.

=== Gwynedd ===
==== Gwynedd ====
Between 2004 and 2022 for elections to Gwynedd Council: Aberdaron, Aberdovey, Abererch, Abermaw, Abersoch, Arllechwedd, Bala, Bethel, Bontnewydd, Botwnnog, Bowydd & Rhiw, Brithdir & Llanfachreth/Ganllwyd/Llanelltyd, Bryn-crug/Llanfihangel, Cadnant (Caernarfon), Clynnog, Corris/Mawddwy, Criccieth, Cwm-y-Glo, Deiniol (Bangor), Deiniolen, Dewi (Bangor), Diffwys & Maenofferen, Dolbenmaen, Dolgellau North, Dolgellau South, Dyffryn Ardudwy, Efail-newydd/Buan, Garth (Bangor), Gerlan, Glyder (Bangor), Groeslon, Harlech, Hendre (Bangor), Hirael (Bangor), Llanaelhaearn, Llanbedr, Llanbedrog, Llanberis, Llandderfel, Llanengan, Llangelynin, Llanllyfni, Llanrug, Llanystumdwy, Llanuwchllyn, Llanwnda, Marchog (Bangor), Menai (Bangor), Menai (Caernarfon), Morfa Nefyn, Nefyn, Ogwen, Peblig (Caernarfon), Penisarwaun, Penrhyndeudraeth, Pentir, Penygroes, Porthmadog East, Porthmadog West, Porthmadog-Tremadog, Pwllheli North, Pwllheli South, Seiont (Caernarfon), Talysarn, Teigl, Trawsfynydd, Tregarth & Mynydd Llandygai, Tudweilio, Tywyn, Waunfawr, Y Felinheli.

==== Isle of Anglesey ====
Since 2013 for elections to Isle of Anglesey County Council: Aethwy, Bro Aberffraw, Bro Rhosyr, Caergybi, Canolbarth Môn, Llifôn, Lligwy, Seiriol, Talybolion, Twrcelyn, Ynys Gybi.

For elections to Isle of Anglesey County Council 1995–2008: Aberffraw, Amlwch Port, Amlwch Rural, Beaumaris, Bodffordd, Bodorgan, Braint, Bryngwran, Brynteg, Cadnant, Cefni, Cwm Cadnant, Cyngar, Gwyngyll, Holyhead Town, Kingsland, Llanbadrig, Llanbedrgoch, Llanddyfnan, Llaneilian, Llanfaethlu, Llanfair-yn-Neubwll, Llanfihangel Ysgeifiog, Llangoed, Llanidan, Llannerch-y-medd, London Road, Maeshyfryd, Mechell, Moelfre, Morawelon, Parc a'r Mynydd, Pentraeth, Porthyfelin, Rhosneigr, Rhosyr, Trearddur, Tudur, Tysilio, Valley.

=== Mid Glamorgan ===
==== Bridgend ====
Since 1999 for elections to Bridgend County Borough Council: Aberkenfig, Bettws ( –2022), Blackmill, Blaengarw ( –2022), Brackla ( –2022), Brackla East and Coychurch Lower (2022– ), Brackla East Central (2022– ), Brackla West (2022– ), Brackla West Central (2022– ), Bridgend Central (2022– ), Bryntirion, Laleston and Merthyr Mawr, Caerau, Cefn Cribwr ( –2022), Cefn Glas, Coity ( –2022), Coity Higher (2022– ), Cornelly, Coychurch Lower ( –2022), Felindre ( –2022), Garw Valley (2022– ), Hendre ( –2022), Litchard ( –2022), Llangeinor ( –2022), Llangewydd and Brynhyfryd ( –2022), Llangynwyd, Maesteg East, Maesteg West, Morfa (Bridgend), Nant-y-moel, Newcastle ( –2022), Newton, Nottage, Ogmore Vale, Oldcastle (Bridgend), Pencoed and Penprysg (2022– ), Pendre ( –2022), Penprysg ( –2022), Pen-y-fai, Pontycymmer ( –2022), Porthcawl East Central, Porthcawl West Central, Pyle ( –2022), Pyle Kenfig Hill and Cefn Cribwr ( –2022), Rest Bay, Sarn ( –2022), St Bride's Minor and Ynysawdre (2022– ), Ynysawdre ( –2022).

==== Merthyr Tydfil ====
Since 1995 for elections to Merthyr Tydfil County Borough Council: Bedlinog, Cyfarthfa, Dowlais, Gurnos, Merthyr Vale, Park, Penydarren, Plymouth, Town, Treharris, Vaynor.

==== Rhondda Cynon Taf ====
Since 1995 for elections to Rhondda Cynon Taf County Borough Council: Abercynon, Aberdare East, Aberdare West and Llwydcoed, Church Village (Llantwit Fardre), Cilfynydd (Pontypridd), Cwmbach, Cwm Clydach, Cymer, Gilfach Goch, Glyn-coch (Pontypridd), Llanharry, Llantwit Fardre, Llwyn-y-pia, Penrhiw-ceibr, Pentre, Pen-y-graig, Pen-y-waun, Pontypridd Town, Porth, Taffs Well, Ton-teg (Llantwit Fardre), Tonypandy, Tonyrefail East, Tonyrefail West, Trallwng (Pontypridd), Trealaw, Treforest (Pontypridd), Treherbert, Treorchy, Ynysybwl, Ystrad.

Only since 2022 for elections to Rhondda Cynon Taf County Borough Council: Aberaman, Beddau and Tyn-y-nant, Brynna and Llanharan, Ferndale and Maerdy, Graig and Pontypridd West, Hawthorn and Lower Rhydfelen, Hirwaun, Penderyn and Rhigos, Llantrisant and Talbot Green, Mountain Ash, Pontyclun Central, Pontyclun East, Pontyclun West, Rhydfelen Central (Pontypridd), Tylorstown and Ynyshir, Upper Rhydfelen and Glyn-Taf.

Between 1995 and 2021 for elections to Rhondda Cynon Taf County Borough Council: Aberaman North, Aberaman South, Beddau (Llantrisant), Brynna, Ferndale, Graig (Pontypridd), Hawthorn (Pontypridd), Hirwaun, Llanharan, Llantrisant Town, Maerdy, Mountain Ash East, Mountain Ash West, Pont-y-clun, Rhigos, Rhondda (Pontypridd), Rhydfelen Central/Ilan (Pontypridd), Talbot Green (Llantrisant), Tylorstown, Tyn-y-nant (Llantrisant), Ynyshir.

=== Powys ===
Between 1995 and 2021 for elections to Powys County Council: Aber-craf, Banwy, Beguildy, Berriew, Blaen Hafren, Bronllys, Builth, Bwlch, Caersws, Churchstoke, Crickhowell, Cwm-twrch, Disserth and Trecoed, Dolforwyn, Felin-fâch, Forden, Glantwymyn, Glasbury, Guilsfield, Gwernyfed, Hay, Kerry, Knighton, Llanafanfawr, Llanbadarn Fawr, Llanbrynmair, Llandinam, Llandrindod East/Llandrindod West, Llandrindod North, Llandrindod South, Llandrinio, Llandysilio, Llanelwedd, Llanfair Caereinion, Llanfihangel, Llanfyllin, Llangattock, Llangors, Llangunllo, Llangynidr, Llanidloes, Llanrhaeadr-ym-Mochnant/Llansilin, Llansantffraid, Llanwddyn, Llanwrtyd Wells, Llanyre, Machynlleth, Maescar/Llywel, Meifod, Montgomery, Nantmel, Newtown Central, Newtown East, Newtown Llanllwchaiarn North, Newtown Llanllwchaiarn West, Newtown South, Old Radnor, Presteigne, Rhayader, Rhiwcynon, St David Within (Brecon), St John (Brecon), St Mary (Brecon), Talgarth, Talybont-on-Usk, Tawe Uchaf, Trewern, Welshpool Castle, Welshpool Gungrog, Welshpool Llanerchyddol, Ynyscedwyn, Yscir, Ystradgynlais.

Since 2022 for elections to Powys County Council: Aber-craf and Ystradgynlais, Banwy Llanfihangel and Llanwddyn, Berriew and Castle Caereinion, Brecon East, Brecon West, Bronllys and Felin-fach, Builth, Caersws, Churchstoke, Crickhowell with Cwmdu and Tretower, Cwm-twrch, Disserth and Trecoed with Newbridge, Dolforwyn, Forden and Montgomery, Glantwymyn, Glasbury, Guilsfield, Gwernyfed, Hay, Ithon Valley, Kerry, Knighton with Beguildy, Llanafanfawr with Garth, Llanbrynmair, Llandinam with Dolfor, Llandrindod North, Llandrindod South, Llandrinio, Llandysilio, Llanelwedd, Llanfair Caereinion and Llanerfyl, Llanfyllin, Llangattock and Llangynidr, Llangors with Bwlch, Llangunllo with Norton, Llangyniew and Meifod, Llanidloes, Llanrhaeadr-ym-Mochnant and Llansilin, Llansantffraid, Llanwrtyd Wells, Llanyre with Nantmel, Machynlleth, Maescar and Llywel, Newtown Central and South, Newtown East, Newtown North, Newtown West, Old Radnor, Presteigne, Rhayader, Rhiwcynon, Talgarth, Talybont-on-Usk, Tawe Uchaf, Trelystan and Trewern, Welshpool Castle, Welshpool Gungrog, Welshpool Llanerchyddol, Ynyscedwyn, Yscir with Honddu Isaf and Llanddew.

=== South Glamorgan ===
==== Cardiff ====
Since 1995 for elections to the City of Cardiff Council: Adamsdown, Butetown, Caerau, Canton, Cathays, Creigiau/St Fagans (1999–2022), Cyncoed, Ely, Fairwater, Gabalfa, Grangetown, Heath, Lisvane and St Mellons (–1999), Lisvane (1999–2022), Lisvane and Thornhill (2022–), Llandaff, Llandaff North, Llanishen, Llanrumney, Pentwyn, Pentyrch (–2022), Pentyrch and St Fagans (2022–), (Penylan, Plasnewydd, Pontprennau & Old St Mellons (1999–), Radyr and St Fagans (–1999), Radyr (1999–), Rhiwbina, Riverside, Rumney, Splott, Trowbridge, Whitchurch & Tongwynlais.

==== Vale of Glamorgan ====
Since 2004 for elections to the Vale of Glamorgan Council: Baruc (Barry), Buttrills (Barry), Cadoc (Barry), Castleland (Barry), Cornerswell (Penarth), Court (Barry), Cowbridge, Dinas Powys, Dyfan (Barry), Gibbonsdown (Barry), Illtyd (Barry), Llandough, Llandow (2022–), Llandow/Ewenny (1995–2022), Llantwit Major, Peterston-super-Ely, Plymouth (Penarth), Rhoose, Stanwell (Penarth), St Athan, St Augustine's (Penarth), St Nicholas and Llancarfan (2022–), St Bride's Major, Sully, Wenvoe.

=== West Glamorgan ===
==== Neath Port Talbot ====
Since 1995 for elections to the Neath Port Talbot County Borough Council: Aberavon, Aberdulais, Allt-wen, Baglan, Blaengwrach, Briton Ferry East, Briton Ferry West, Bryn and Cwmavon, Bryn-côch North, Bryn-côch South, Cadoxton, Cimla, Coedffranc Central, Coedffranc North, Coedffranc West, Crynant, Cwmllynfell, Cymmer, Dyffryn, Glyncorrwg, Glynneath, Godre'r graig, Gwaun-Cae-Gurwen, Gwynfi, Lower Brynamman, Margam, Neath East, Neath North, Neath South, Onllwyn, Pelenna, Pontardawe, Port Talbot, Resolven, Rhos, Sandfields East, Sandfields West, Seven Sisters, Tai-bach, Tonna, Trebanos, Ystalyfera.

==== Swansea ====
Since 1995 for elections to the City and County of Swansea Council: Bishopston, Bon-y-maen, Castle, Clydach, Cockett, Cwmbwrla, Dunvant (–2022), Dunvant and Killay (2022–), Fairwood, Gorseinon (–2022), Gorseinon and Penyrheol (2022–), Gower, Gowerton, Killay North (–2022), Killay South (–2022), Kingsbridge (–2022), Landore, Llangyfelach, Llansamlet, Llwchwr (2022–), Lower Loughor (–2022), Mawr (–2022), Mayals, Morriston, Mumbles (2022–), Mynydd-bach, Newton (–2022), Oystermouth (–2022), Penclawdd, Penderry, Penllergaer, Pennard, Penyrheol (–2022), Pontardulais, Pontlliw and Tircoed (2022–), Sketty, St Thomas, Townhill, Uplands, Upper Loughor (–2022), Waterfront (2022–), Waunarlwydd (2022–), West Cross.

== See also ==
- Politics of Wales
- Local government in Wales
- List of electoral wards in England by constituency
- Isle of Anglesey electoral boundary changes 2012

== Sources ==
- The Parliamentary Constituencies and Assembly Electoral Regions (Wales) Order 2006, Schedule 1 - Name, Designation And Composition Of Parliamentary Constituencies In Wales, Legislation.gov.uk
