= List of places in Anglesey (categorised) =

This is a categorised list of places in the principal area of Anglesey, north Wales. See the list of places in Wales for places in other principal areas.

== Administrative divisions ==
=== Electoral wards ===
See the article on electoral wards for an explanation of this list.

Electoral wards to Isle of Anglesey County Council prior to the 2012 electoral boundary changes:

- Aberffraw
- Amlwch Port*
- Amlwch Rural*
- Beaumaris
- Bodffordd
- Bodorgan
- Braint*
- Bryngwran
- Brynteg*
- Cadnant*
- Cefni
- Cwm Cadnant
- Cyngar*
- Gwyngyll*
- Holyhead Town*
- Kingsland*
- Llanbadrig
- Llanbedrgoch*
- Llanddyfnan
- Llaneilian
- Llanfaethlu
- Llanfair-yn-Neubwll
- Llanfihangel Ysgeifiog
- Llangoed
- Llanidan
- Llannerch-y-medd
- London Road*
- Maeshyfryd*
- Mechell
- Moelfre
- Morawelon*
- Parc a'r Mynydd*
- Pentraeth
- Porthyfelin*
- Rhosneigr*
- Rhosyr
- Trearddur
- Tudur*
- Tysilio*
- Valley

* = remains as community ward for community council elections

Post-2012 county council wards:

- Aethwy
- Bro Aberffraw
- Bro Rhosyr
- Caergybi
- Canolbarth Môn
- Llifôn
- Lligwy
- Seiriol
- Talybolion
- Twrcelyn
- Ynys Gybi

=== Communities ===
This is a list of local communities:

- Aberffraw
- Amlwch
- Beaumaris
- Bodedern
- Bodffordd
- Bodorgan
- Bryngwran
- Cwm Cadnant
- Cylch-y-Garn
- Holyhead
- Llanbadrig
- Llanddaniel Fab
- Llanddona
- Llanddyfnan
- Llaneilian
- Llaneugrad
- Llanfachraeth
- Llanfaelog
- Llanfaethlu
- Llanfair Pwllgwyngyll
- Llanfair-Mathafarn-Eithaf
- Llanfair-yn-Neubwll
- Llanfihangel Ysgeifiog
- Llangefni
- Llangoed
- Llangristiolus
- Llanidan
- Llannerch-y-medd
- Mechell
- Menai Bridge
- Moelfre
- Penmynydd
- Pentraeth
- Rhoscolyn
- Rhosybol
- Rhosyr
- Trearddur
- Tref Alaw
- Trewalchmai
- Valley

== See also ==
- List of places in Anglesey
- List of Anglesey towns by population
