= 2008 Monmouthshire County Council election =

2008 Welsh local government election

Results of the 2008 Monmouthshire County Council election

2008 Elections to Monmouthshire County Council were held on 1 May 2008. The whole council was up for election and the Conservative Party held overall control of the council. The election was preceded by the 2004 elections and followed by the 2012 elections.

== Election results: overview ==
Monmouthshire local election result 2008
Party	Seats	Gains	Losses	Net gain/loss	Seats %	Votes %	Votes	+/−
Conservative	29	5	0	+5	67.44	47.15	12,879	+3.55
Liberal Democrats	5	2	0	+2	11.63	22.20	6,061	+4.03
Labour	7	2	4	-2	16.28	17.51	4,782	-2.43
Independent	1	0	4	-4	2.36	7.73	2,110	-6.59
Plaid Cymru	1	0	1	-1	2.36	4.75	1,296	+1.74
Green	0	0	0	=	0.00	0.64	175	+0.46
UKIP	0	0	0	=	-	-	-	-0.80

Monmouthshire local election result 2008 (wards in Monmouth constituency)
Party	Seats	Gains	Losses	Net gain/loss	Seats %	Votes %	Votes	+/−
Conservative	28	3	0	+3	80.00	52.50	11,746	+4.93
Liberal Democrats	4	1	0	+1	14.29	23.14	5,177	+1.47
Labour	3	0	1	-1	8.57	13.93	3,116	-2.79
Independent	1	0	3	-3	2.86	7.77	1,738	-5.32
Plaid Cymru	0	0	0	=	0.00	1.88	423	+1.15
Green	0	0	0	=	0.00	0.78	175	+0.56

Monmouthshire local election result 2008 (wards in Newport East constituency)
Party	Seats	Gains	Losses	Net gain/loss	Seats %	Votes %	Votes	+/−
Labour	4	2	2	=	50.00	33.81	1,666	-2.65
Conservative	2	1	0	+1	25.00	22.99	1,133	-0.80
Liberal Democrats	1	1	0	+1	12.50	17.94	884	+17.94
Plaid Cymru	1	0	1	-1	12.50	17.72	873	+2.90
Independent	0	0	1	-1	0.00	7.54	372	-13.14
Green	0	0	0	=	0.00	-	-	-
UKIP	0	0	0	=	-	-	-	-4.97

== Electoral division (ward) results ==
Abergavenny, Cantref
Party	Candidate	Votes	%	±%
Conservative	Paul Richard Jordan	453	52.98	−4.22
Labour	Margaret Harris	243	28.42	+12.47
Plaid Cymru	John Walters	86	10.06	+10.06
Liberal Democrats	Patricia (Pat) Morris	73	8.54	+8.54
Majority		210	24.56	−5.78
Turnout		855	51.01	−6.86
Conservative hold		Swing	-8.38	

Abergavenny, Castle
Party	Candidate	Votes	%	±%
Conservative	Maureen Powell	370	45.48	−1.54
Independent	Anthony (Tony) O'Donovan	283	33.61	+11.43
Labour	Margaret E. Phillips	129	15.32	−1.48
Liberal Democrats	Tony R. Potts	60	7.13	−3.46
Majority		87	10.33	−12.67
Turnout		842	53.35	−0.51
Conservative hold		Swing	-6.47	

Abergavenny, Grofield
Party	Candidate	Votes	%	±%
Liberal Democrats	Douglas L. Edwards	431	70.89	+26.87
Conservative	Nigel C. Beaven	122	20.07	−4.79
Plaid Cymru	Mary Harris	55	9.05	+9.05
Majority		309	50.82	+31.66
Turnout		612	48.15	−8.80
Liberal Democrats hold		Swing	+15.83	

Abergavenny, Lansdown
Party	Candidate	Votes	%	±%
Liberal Democrats	James George	359	53.03	+48.43
Labour	Robin A. Griffiths	164	24.22	−16.50
Conservative	Martin J. Hickman	112	16.54	−3.33
Independent	Norma C. Watkins	30	4.43	−24.30
Plaid Cymru	Laurie Jones	12	1.77	−4.31
Majority		195	28.81	+16.82
Turnout		677	43.63	+6.26
Liberal Democrats gain from Labour		Swing	+32.29	

Abergavenny, Priory
Party	Candidate	Votes	%	±%
Conservative	Jane P. Foulser	423	67.04	+20.75
Liberal Democrats	Caroline Duchet	208	32.96	+24.07
Majority		215	34.08	+16.16
Turnout		631	42.54	−3.4
Conservative hold		Swing		

Caerwent
Party	Candidate	Votes	%	±%
Conservative	Philip (Phil) Murphy	458	71.56	+16.15
Labour	Julie Roberts	118	18.15	−17.81
Liberal Democrats	Thomas (Tom) Sullivan	64	9.85	+1.66
Majority		430	34.08	+16.16
Turnout		640	46.14	−4.37
Conservative hold		Swing	+16.98	

Chepstow, Larkfield
Party	Candidate	Votes	%	±%
Liberal Democrats	Phylip (Phil) A. D. Hobson	417	51.74	−1.82
Conservative	Martin Brady	305	37.84	−8.60
Labour	David Roman	84	10.42	+10.42
Majority		112	13.09	+6.78
Turnout		806	53.47	+0.80
Liberal Democrats hold		Swing	+3.89	

Chepstow, St. Christopher's
Party	Candidate	Votes	%	±%
Conservative	Stephanie M. Dovey	205	35.10	+6.46
Liberal Democrats	Henry Ashby	203	34.76	+22.03
Labour	Pamela (Pam) Birchall	176	30.14	−10.06
Majority		2	0.34	n/a
Turnout		584	35.74	+1.04
Conservative gain from Labour		Swing	+8.26	

Chepstow, St. Kingsmark
Party	Candidate	Votes	%	±%
Conservative	David L. S. Dovey	474	55.50	+8.30
Liberal Democrats	Henry Hodges	270	31.62	−11.45
Labour	Hilary M. Beach	110	12.88	+3.15
Majority		204	23.88	+19.75
Turnout		854	40.44	−4.91
Conservative hold		Swing	+9.88	

Chepstow, St. Mary's
Party	Candidate	Votes	%	±%
Liberal Democrats	Jacqueline (Jacqui) Sullivan	362	58.96	+9.70
Conservative	Benjamin (Ben) Smith	166	27.04	−4.69
Labour	Thomas (Tom) P. Kirton	86	14.01	−5.00
Majority		196	31.92	+14.39
Turnout		614	45.09	+4.65
Liberal Democrats hold		Swing	+7.20	

Chepstow, Thornwell
Party	Candidate	Votes	%	±%
Labour	Armand C. Watts	396	54.17	+0.03
Conservative	Marian J. Lewis	234	32.01	−1.66
Liberal Democrats	Anthony (Tony) Redhead	101	13.82	+1.63
Majority		162	22.16	+1.69
Turnout		731	39.74	+2.39
Labour hold		Swing	+0.85	

Croesonen
Party	Candidate	Votes	%	±%
Labour	Roger G. Harris	308	51.94	+11.78
Conservative	Laura L. Pike	219	36.93	+5.71
Liberal Democrats	Charlotte Jones	66	11.13	+5.76
Majority		89	15.01	+6.07
Turnout		593	39.63	+0.00
Labour hold		Swing	+3.04	

Crucorney
Party	Candidate	Votes	%	±%
Conservative	Andrew C. James	469		−
Independent	Robert (Bob) J. B. Wilcox	381		−
Liberal Democrats	Nicholas (Nick) Tatam	65		−
Majority				−
Turnout		917	57.89	
Conservative gain from Independent		Swing		

Devauden
Party	Candidate	Votes	%	±%
Conservative	Robert J. W. Greenland	uncontested		−
Majority		-	-	−
Turnout		-	-	−
Conservative hold		Swing	-	

Goetre Fawr
Party	Candidate	Votes	%	±%
Conservative	Bryan Jones	623		−
Plaid Cymru	Edward H. Evans	235		−
Majority				−
Turnout		871	47.00	−12.94
Conservative hold		Swing		

Llanbadoc
Party	Candidate	Votes	%	±%
Conservative	Valerie (Val) E. Smith	uncontested		−
Conservative hold		Swing	-	

Llanelly Hill (2)
Party	Candidate	Votes	%	±%
Independent	Simon G. M. Howarth	887		−
Conservative	Giles Howard	624		−
Independent	Adrian Edwards	545	6.55	−
Independent	Anthony (Tony) R. Carrington	458		−
Independent	Martin L. Thomas	310		−
Turnout			52.17	+4.81
Independent hold		Swing	-	
Conservative gain from Independent		Swing		

Llanfoist Fawr
Party	Candidate	Votes	%	±%
Conservative	Eric Saxon	345	56.84	−13.22
Liberal Democrats	Jan Shivel	261	43.16	+30.31
Majority		84	13.68	−39.29
Turnout		607	48.72	−6.96
Conservative hold		Swing	-21.77	

Llangybi Fawr
Party	Candidate	Votes	%	±%
Conservative	Peter R. Clarke	Uncontested		−
Conservative hold		Swing	-	

Llanover
Party	Candidate	Votes	%	±%
Conservative	Brian R. Hood	655	66.70	−9.01
Labour	Margaret E. Willcock	205	20.88	+7.85
Liberal Democrats	Tim Willott	118	12.02	+0.76
Majority		450	45.82	−16.86
Turnout		982	54.40	−1.92
Conservative hold		Swing	-8.43	

Llantilio Crossenny
Party	Candidate	Votes	%	±%
Conservative	Ruth Edwards	530	74.54	+32.73
Liberal Democrats	Patrick Tandy	181	25.46	+17.57
Majority		349	49.08	+41.88
Turnout		711	51.82	−11.16
Conservative hold		Swing	+7.58	

Llanwenarth Ultra
Party	Candidate	Votes	%	±%
Labour	Christine Walby	276	50.27	+8.58
Conservative	Owen W. M. Marsh	273	49.73	+23.55
Majority		3	9.56	−9.02
Turnout		562	51.28 56.32	−5.04
Labour hold		Swing	-7.49	

Magor with Undy, Mill
Party	Candidate	Votes	%	±%
Conservative	John Major	513	61.27	−3.55
Labour	Neeta S. Baicher	206	24.58	−10.60
Liberal Democrats	Paul Rutter	119	14.15	+14.15
Majority		307	36.69	+7.05
Turnout		838	39.59	−1.03
Conservative hold		Swing	+3.53	

Magor with Undy, The Elms
Party	Candidate	Votes	%	±%
Conservative	James Harris	334	42.82	+20.37
Independent	Olive Evans	209	26.80	+26.80
Independent	Brian A. Burt	159	20.39	+20.39
Liberal Democrats	Ben Robbins	78	9.99	+9.99
Majority		125	16.02	+15.33
Turnout		782	33.00	−3.68
Conservative gain from Labour		Swing	+3.22	

Mardy
Party	Candidate	Votes	%	±%
Conservative	John Prosser	234	39.13	+2.95
Independent	Ralph F. Chapman	175	29.26	+1.64
Labour	Adrian J. G. Nelmes	120	20.07	−2.79
Plaid Cymru	Stuart K. Neale	35	5.85	−0.61
Liberal Democrats	Emily Robbins	34	5.69	−2.41
Majority		59	9.87	+1.31
Turnout		598	44.59	−2.23
Conservative hold		Swing	+0.66	

Mitchel Troy
Party	Candidate	Votes	%	±%
Conservative	Geoffrey (Geoff) C. Burrows	350	63.99	+10.39
Liberal Democrats	Alison Willott	197	36.01	−10.39
Majority		153	27.98	+20.78
Turnout		548	58.54	+5.03
Conservative hold		Swing	+10.39	

Monmouth, Dixton with Osbaston
Party	Candidate	Votes	%	±%
Conservative	Bob Hayward	549	64.14	+16.70
Liberal Democrats	Anthea M. Dewhurst	307	35.86	−16.70
Majority		242	28.28	+23.16
Turnout		861	47.54	−10.82
Conservative gain from Liberal Democrats		Swing	+16.70	

Monmouth, Drybridge
Party	Candidate	Votes	%	±%
Conservative	Alan M. Wintle	488	49.24	+2.58
Liberal Democrats	Richard Bond	330	33.30	−6.43
Labour	Maureen Roach	173	17.46	+17.46
Majority		158	15.94	+9.01
Turnout		1000	41.88	−1.55
Conservative hold		Swing	+4.51	
