= Caergybi (disambiguation) =

Caergybi is the Welsh name for the town of Holyhead in Anglesey, Wales.

It can also refer to:

- Caergybi (electoral ward), an electoral division of Holyhead which elects councillors to the county council.
- Caer Gybi (fort), a Roman fort in the centre of Holyhead.
