= Bulwark, Chepstow =

Coordinates: 51.630244°N 2.673712°W

Bulwark
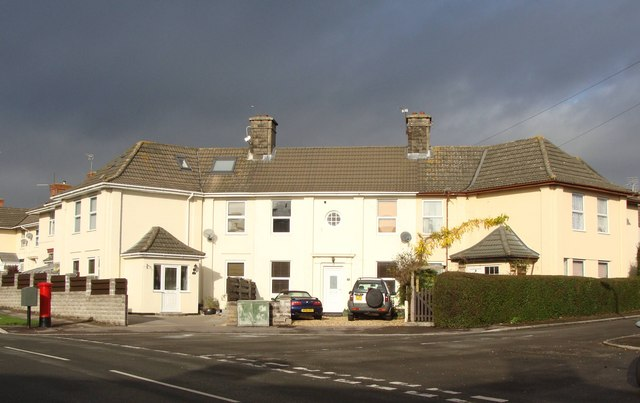
- Housing at The Octagon, Bulwark

- Location within Monmouthshire
- OS grid reference: ST 53448 92564
- Principal area: Monmouthshire
- Preserved county: Gwent
- Country: Wales
- Sovereign state: United Kingdom
- Post town: CHEPSTOW
- Postcode district: NP16
- Dialling code: 01291
- Police: Gwent
- Fire: South Wales
- Ambulance: Welsh
- UK Parliament: Monmouth
- Senedd Cymru – Welsh Parliament: Monmouth

Bulwark is a predominantly residential area of Chepstow, Monmouthshire, Wales, largely developed during the twentieth century. The area is so named because of its Iron Age fort, which is now maintained as a public open space. Substantial development in the area began during the First World War, with housing being provided for the military and civilian workforce brought to the area for the National Shipyard no.1 at Chepstow.

== History ==
=== Bulwarks Camp ===
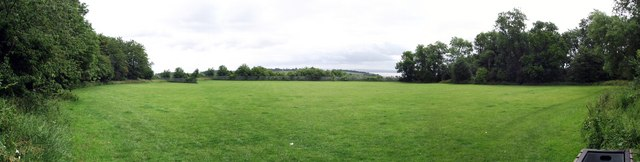
Bulwarks Camp

Bulwarks Camp, also known in the past as Hardwick Camp and locally as the Warren, is a small defensive hill fort, on top of cliffs overlooking the River Wye, the Beachley peninsula and the Severn estuary. It was probably built around the first century BC or the first century AD. The Romans called the inhabitants of the area the Silures; they would have spoken the language that became Welsh. The fort had cliffs to the east, a ravine to the south, and earthworks comprising a double rampart and ditch on the other two sides. Excavations in 1968 revealed traces of three buildings inside the ramparts, and indicated that it had remained inhabited after the start of the Roman occupation. The site is now in the care of Cadw and is used as a public open space.

=== Hardwick House and nineteenth-century development ===
Until the nineteenth century, the Bulwark area was generally known as Hardwick, a name given to areas of cattle farming in Saxon times. It may be the "hardwick" mentioned in the Domesday Book under the name of Lamecare, though other sites have also been suggested. The area was predominantly in agricultural use until the twentieth century, with farms including Claypits, St Tecla, and Burnt Barn. The manor house, Hardwick House, was in existence in the 14th century and was rebuilt several times; it was later known as Hardwick Court. The house was demolished in the 1960s, and some of its grounds then became a public open space, known locally as "Piggy's Hill". The area south of the A48 Newport Road contains a number of large 19th-century villas which were on the outskirts of Chepstow when built, and commanded extensive views eastwards towards Sedbury. Nearby, on the road towards Mathern, Chepstow Cemetery was established in 1855, after the town's churchyard was deemed to be overcrowded; it received its first burials two years later.

=== Bulwark Garden Suburb ===
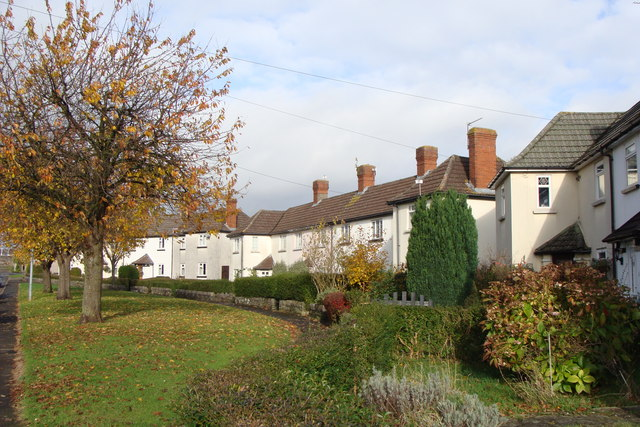
"Garden Suburb" housing in Bulwark

Bulwark Garden Suburb was developed between 1917 and 1919, as housing for the workers at the National Shipyard which was established during the First World War south-east of the railway line at Chepstow. The housing was centred on The Octagon, at the intersection of Bulwark Avenue and Victoria Road, where it was designed by Henry Farmer of the Admiralty with advice from the architect and writer Henry Avray Tipping of Mounton. Elsewhere, concrete huts were built as temporary housing, some of which were later converted into industrial units. Several of these were used as workshops by the Red & White Bus Company, which established its headquarters on Bulwark Road in 1938. During the Second World War, most of the huts were converted into accommodation for prisoners of war, and the area was later redeveloped as an industrial estate.

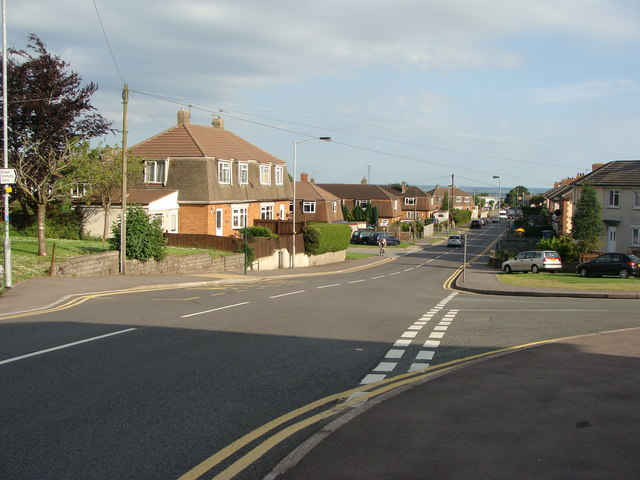
Bulwark Road

=== Later development ===
The first council houses in the area were built by Chepstow Urban District Council in the St Tecla area, near to Hardwick Court, in the 1930s, in part to house residents moved out of the Thomas Street area of the town centre in a slum clearance project. Development continued thereafter, accommodating most of Chepstow's development in the mid-twentieth century. A shopping area developed on Bulwark Road, and the Severn Bridge Social Club (closed in 2019) was opened on the site of the former Claypits Farm in 1965. The entire area between the cliffs and the A466 link road to the motorway was developed for new housing by the 1970s. New development later spread southwards into the Thornwell area, beside the motorway junction. The Bulwark and Thornwell areas together accommodate over half of the resident population of Chepstow.

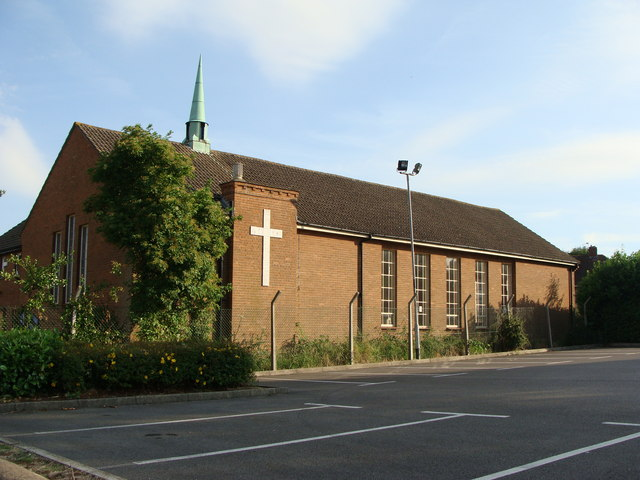
St Christopher's Church

== Governance ==
The areas known as Bulwark and Thornwell together comprise the wards of Larkfield, St Christopher's and Thornwell on Monmouthshire County Council. Following the 2012 local elections, current councillors are Phyl Hobson (Liberal Democrat, Larkfield), Armand Watts (Labour, Thornwell), and Dimitri Batrouni (Labour, St Christopher's).

== Facilities ==
Bulwark contains three primary schools (Pembroke Primary School, Thornwell Primary School and St. Mary's R.C. Primary School), the Two Brewers pub, and Bulwark Community Centre. Churches include St Christopher's (Church in Wales) and St Mary's (Catholic). The Bulwark shopping centre includes a Lidl store.

== Notable residents ==
Hardwick House was the home of the Bishop of Llandaff, Edward Copleston (1776-1849), between 1836 and his death. Bulwark was also the childhood home of Richard William Church (1815-1890), Dean of St Paul's Cathedral and writer.
