= Pembroke Dock Llanion =

Coordinates: 51.6938°N 4.9285°W

- Electoral ward
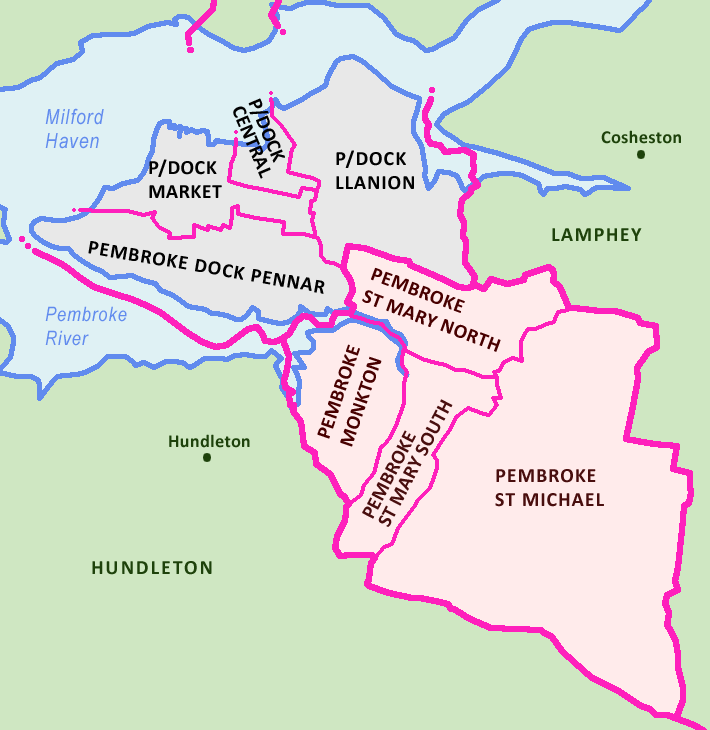
- Pre-2022 ward locations within the towns of Pembroke and Pembroke Dock

- Location within Pembrokeshire
- Population: 2,850 (2011 census)
- Principal area: Pembrokeshire
- Country: Wales
- Sovereign state: United Kingdom
- Post town: PEMBROKE DOCK
- Postcode district: SA72
- Dialling code: 01646
- UK Parliament: Carmarthen West and South Pembrokeshire
- Senedd Cymru – Welsh Parliament: Carmarthen West and South Pembrokeshire
- Councillors: 1 (County); 5 (Town Council)

Pembroke Dock Llanion was the name of a county electoral ward in the town of Pembroke Dock, Pembrokeshire, Wales. Llanion remains as a ward for elections to Pembroke Dock Town Council.

== Description ==
Pembroke Dock Llanion ward covered the area east side of the town centre and Pembroke Dock railway station. It included the areas of Llanion and Waterloo. The three other Pembroke Dock wards lay to the west and Pembroke St Mary North lay to the south.

The ward elected a county councillor to Pembrokeshire County Council and five town councillors to Pembroke Dock Town Council.

According to the 2011 UK Census the population of the ward was 2,850.

== History ==
Prior to 1995 Pembroke Dock Llanion was a ward for Dyfed County Council and also included the neighbouring Pembroke Dock Central and the community of Cosheston.

Following the recommendations of a boundary review by the Local Government Boundary Commission for Wales, effective from the 2022 local elections, the Pembroke Dock Llanion and Pembroke Dock Central wards were reconfigured, to increase the electorate of Central. And area of the Llanion ward as far as the Pembroke Ferry road was transferred to Pembroke Dock Central. The remaining area of the former Pembroke Dock Llanion ward became a new ward, named 'Pembroke Dock: Bush'.

== County elections ==
At the May 2017 county election the seat was won by university student Joshua Beynon, age 19, who became the youngest person elected to the council.

2017 Pembrokeshire County Council election
| Party | Candidate | Votes | % | ±% |
|---|---|---|---|---|
| Labour | Joshua Beynon | 290 | | |
| Independent | Peter Kraus | 281 | | |
| Independent | William Rees | 239 | | |

At the May 2012 county election Pembroke Dock Llanion was retained by Labour councillor Sue Perkins. Councillor Perkins had been county councillor for the ward since the 1999 election.

2012 Pembrokeshire County Council election
| Party | Candidate | Votes | % | ±% |
|---|---|---|---|---|
| Labour | Sue Perkins * | 395 | | |
| Independent | Peter Kraus | 338 | | |

* = sitting councillor prior to the election

== See also ==
- List of electoral wards in Pembrokeshire
