= 2004 Monmouthshire County Council election =

2004 Welsh local government election

Results of the 2004 Monmouthshire County Council election

The 2004 Monmouthshire County Council election was held on 10 June 2004 to Monmouthshire County Council in southeast Wales, on the same day of the European Elections. The election was preceded by the 1999 elections and followed by the 2008 elections.

== Background ==
The Conservatives formed a minority administration from the previous county council election in May 1999, being largest group on the council by one seat.

Following two by-elections in 2002 (the Conservatives losing one seat to the Liberal Democrats and Labour taking a seat from an Independent), the Labour party became the largest group by one seat.

Having secured the support of Independent and Liberal Democrat councillors, Labour formed a minority administration from July 2002 until the election in June 2004.

In June 2004 the whole council was up for election and following boundary changes the number of seats was increased to 43.

== Overview of results ==
The Conservatives gained overall control of the council from a previous minority Labour administration.

After the election, the composition of the council was:

- Conservative 23
- Labour 9
- Liberal Democrats 4
- Plaid Cymru 2
- Independents 5

The election results were noticeable seeing two Plaid Cymru councillors elected in Caldicot, a first for the Welsh nationalists in heavily anglicised Monmouthshire, and the election of a 21-year-old student, Matthew Jones , for the Liberal Democrats in Chepstow.

The Labour party suffered heavy losses to the Conservatives, the Liberal Democrats, Plaid Cymru and Independents.

The election result saw a fragmentation of the non-conservative vote; the emergence of the Liberal Democrats and Plaid Cymru onto the council. Of note was the number of close races in individual wards, as well as several individual contests where the winning candidate polled far less than a majority of the votes cast.

== Election results table(s) ==
Monmouthshire local election result 2004
Party	Seats	Gains	Losses	Net gain/loss	Seats %	Votes %	Votes	+/−
Conservative	23	7	2	+5	53.49	43.60	13,888	-
Labour	9	1	11	-10	20.93	19.92	6,345	-
Liberal Democrats	4	3	1	+3	9.30	18.17	5,786	-
Independent	5	3	1	+2	11.63	14.32	4,560	-
Plaid Cymru	2	2	0	+2	4.65	3.01	958	-
UKIP	0	0	0	=	0.00	0.80	256	-
Green	0	0	0	=	0.00	0.18	58	-

Monmouthshire local election result 2004 (wards in Monmouth constituency)
Party	Seats	Gains	Losses	Net gain/loss	Seats %	Votes %	Votes	+/−
Conservative	22	7	2	+5	65.71	47.57	12,699	-
Liberal Democrats	4	4	1	+3	11.43	21.67	5,786	-
Labour	4	0	8	-8	11.43	16.72	4,466	-
Independent	4	2	0	+2	11.43	13.09	3,494	-
Plaid Cymru	0	0	0	=	0.00	0.73	194	-
Green	0	0	0	=	0.00	0.22	58	-
UKIP	0	0	0	=	0.00	0.00	-	-

Monmouthshire local election result 2004 (wards in Newport East constituency)
Party	Seats	Gains	Losses	Net gain/loss	Seats %	Votes %	Votes	+/−
Labour	4	1	3	-2	37.50	36.46	1,879	-
Conservative	2	0	0	=	25.00	23.07	1,189	-
Independent	1	1	1	=	12.50	20.68	1,066	-
Plaid Cymru	2	2	0	+2	25.00	14.82	764	-
UKIP	0	0	0	=	0.00	4.97	256	+4.97
Liberal Democrats	0	0	0	=	0.00	-	-	-
Green	0	0	0	=	0.00	-	-	-

== Electoral division (ward) results ==
Abergavenny, Cantref
Party	Candidate	Votes	%	±%
Conservative	Christopher D. Woodhouse	560	57.20	−
Independent	Lawrence R. Jones	263	26.86	−
Labour	Paul M. Nicholson	156	15.94	−
Majority		297	30.34	−
Turnout		979	57.88	
Conservative hold		Swing		

Abergavenny, Castle
Party	Candidate	Votes	%	±%
Conservative	Alan W. Breeze	352	45.48	−
Independent	Anthony (Tony) O'Donovan	174	22.48	−
Labour	Margaret E. Phillips	130	16.80	−
Liberal Democrats	Christopher (Chris) P. Lines	82	10.59	−
Plaid Cymru	Ceri L. Thomas	36	4.65	−
Majority		178	23.00	−
Turnout		774	54.04	
Conservative hold		Swing		

Abergavenny, Grofield
Party	Candidate	Votes	%	±%
Liberal Democrats	Douglas L. Edwards	324	44.02	−
Conservative	Maureen Powell	183	24.86	−
Labour	Andre J. Arkell	182	24.73	−
Independent	Graham D. Preece	47	6.39	−
Majority		141	19.16	−
Turnout		736	56.95	
Liberal Democrats gain from Labour		Swing		

Abergavenny, Lansdown
Party	Candidate	Votes	%	±%
Labour	Robin A. Griffiths	248	40.72	−
Independent	Raymond Hill	175	28.73	−
Conservative	Victor Barrett	121	19.87	−
Plaid Cymru	Richard F. Olding	37	6.08	−
Liberal Democrats	Vera M. Grice	28	4.60	−
Majority		73	11.99	−
Turnout		609	37.37	
Labour hold		Swing		

Abergavenny, Priory
Party	Candidate	Votes	%	±%
Conservative	Jane P. Foulser	375	46.29	−
Labour	Christine M. Walby	198	28.37	−
Plaid Cymru	John R. Walters	63	9.03	−
Liberal Democrats	Rosemary (Rose) E. Carr	62	8.89	−
Majority		177	17.92	−
Turnout		698	45.94	
Conservative hold		Swing		

Caerwent
Party	Candidate	Votes	%	±%
Conservative	Philip (Phil) Murphy	384	55.41	+5.73
Labour	Brian W. Counsell	249	35.93	−6.97
Liberal Democrats	Peter Butcher	60	8.66	+1.24
Majority		135	19.48	+51
Turnout		693	50.51	
Conservative hold		Swing	+6.35	

Caldicot Castle
Party	Candidate	Votes	%	±%
Plaid Cymru	Ronald (Ron) G. Stewart	228	35.73	−
Conservative	Richard J. Harries	213	33.39	−
Labour	Gareth J. Jenkins	197	30.88	−
Majority		15	2.34	−
Turnout		638	45.29	
Plaid Cymru gain from Labour		Swing		

Caldicot, Dewstow
Party	Candidate	Votes	%	±%
Labour	William (Bill) Edwards	238	42.34	−
Independent	Julie A. Fry	142	25.27	−
Plaid Cymru	John I. Marshall	133	23.67	−
Conservative	Nicholas W. L. Hackett-Pain	49	8.72	−
Majority		96	17.07	−
Turnout		562	37.18	
Labour hold		Swing		

Caldicot, Green Lane
Party	Candidate	Votes	%	±%
Plaid Cymru	David J. Ashwin	219	34.71	−
Labour	David J. Evans	165	26.15	−
Independent	Paul D. Tidmarsh	108	17.12	−
Independent	Colin Babb	79	12.51	−
Conservative	Leslie R. Harries	60	9.51	−
Majority		54	8.56	−
Turnout		631	38.69	
Plaid Cymru gain from Labour		Swing		

Caldicot, Severn
Party	Candidate	Votes	%	±%
Labour	Ronald J. Higginson	201	39.19	−
Plaid Cymru	Joanne S. Daniels	136	26.51	−
Independent	Graham Powell	100	19.49	−
Conservative	Penelope Howe	76	14.81	−
Majority		65	12.68	−
Turnout		513	38.81	
Labour hold		Swing		

Caldicot, West End
Party	Candidate	Votes	%	±%
Independent	James D. Harris	329	65.93	−
Labour	Elaine G. Davies	170	34.07	−
Majority		159	31.86	−
Turnout		499	35.01	
Independent gain from Labour		Swing		

Chepstow, Larkfield
Party	Candidate	Votes	%	±%
Liberal Democrats	Phylip Hobson	436	53.56	+41.70
Conservative	Clifford (Cliff) Meredith	378	46.44	−0.51
Labour	DNS	0		−41.19
Majority		58	7.12	n/a
Turnout		814	52.67	
Liberal Democrats gain from Conservative		Swing	+20.60	

Chepstow, St. Christopher’s
Party	Candidate	Votes	%	±%
Labour	Pamela (Pam) Birchall	240	40.20	−17.57
Conservative	David Dovey	171	28.64	+4.56
Independent	Andrew Huntley	110	18.43	+8.66
Liberal Democrats	Anthony (Tony) Redhead	76	12.73	+4.35
Majority		69	11.56	−22.09
Turnout		597	34.70	
Labour hold		Swing	-11.07	

Chepstow, St. Kingsmark
Party	Candidate	Votes	%	±%
Conservative	Theodore (Ted) Dorel	422	47.20	−10.26
Liberal Democrats	Henry W. Hodges	385	43.07	+24.31
Labour	Eric Taylor	87	9.73	−14.05
Majority		37	4.13	−29.56
Turnout		894	45.35	
Conservative hold		Swing	-17.29	

Chepstow, St. Mary’s
Party	Candidate	Votes	%	±%
Liberal Democrats	Matthew A. Jones	337	49.26	+34.87
Conservative	Gethyn J. Davies	217	31.73	−1.31
Labour	Gwyneth Eburne	130	19.01	−33.57
Majority		120	17.53	n/a
Turnout		684	47.24	
Liberal Democrats gain from Labour		Swing	34.22 L to LD	

Chepstow, Thornwell
Party	Candidate	Votes	%	±%
Labour	Armand C. Watts	373	54.14	+12.83
Conservative	James M. Brady	232	33.67	+17.46
Liberal Democrats	Lynda Pitt Mitchell	84	12.19	+3.57
Independent	DNS			−33.86
Majority		141	20.47	+13.20
Turnout		689	37.35	
Labour hold		Swing	+15.15	

Croesonen
Party	Candidate	Votes	%	±%
Labour	Roger G. Harris	247	40.16	−
Conservative	John L. Prosser	192	31.22	−
Independent	Norma C. Watkins	99	16.10	−
Plaid Cymru	Edward H. O. Evans	44	7.15	−
Liberal Democrats	Anthea M. Dewhurst	33	5.37	−
Majority		55	8.94	−
Turnout		615	39.63	
Labour hold		Swing		

Crucorney
Party	Candidate	Votes	%	±%
Independent	Robert (Bob) J. B. Wilcox	585	70.65	−
Conservative	Jean E. Laws	143	17.27	−
Liberal Democrats	David John Williams	100	12.08	−
Majority		442	53.38	−
Turnout		828	53.49	
Independent hold		Swing		

Devauden
Party	Candidate	Votes	%	±%
Conservative	Robert J. W. Greenland	509	76.20	−
Liberal Democrats	David Stevens	159	23.80	−
Majority		350	52.40	−
Turnout		668	57.57	
Conservative hold		Swing		

Goetre Fawr
Party	Candidate	Votes	%	±%
Conservative	Sidney Brian Jones	509	45.65	−
Liberal Democrats	Sylvia E. Heighton	497	44.57	−
Labour	Dorothy M. McLeod	109	9.78	−
Majority		12	1.08	−
Turnout		1,115	59.94	
Conservative hold		Swing		

Llanbadoc
Party	Candidate	Votes	%	±%
Conservative	Valerie (Val) E. Smith	uncontested		−
Conservative hold		Swing	-	

Llanelly Hill (2)
Party	Candidate	Votes	%	±%
Independent	Simon G. M. Howarth	695	21.98	−
Independent	Anthony (Tony) R. Carrington	609	19.26	−
Labour	Giles Howard	521	16.48	−
Conservative	Barrie O'Keefe	475	15.02	−
Labour	Martin L. Thomas	412	13.03	−
Conservative	Jennifer Swattridge	207	6.55	−
Liberal Democrats	Browen R. A. Jones	136	4.30	−
Liberal Democrats	Sarah L. James	107	3.38	−
Turnout		3,162	47.36	
Independent gain from Labour		Swing		
Independent gain from Labour		Swing		

Llanfoist Fawr
Party	Candidate	Votes	%	±%
Conservative	Eric Saxon	496	70.06	−
Labour	Roger P. Howells	121	17.09	−
Liberal Democrats	Vivien Mitchell	91	12.85	−
Majority		375	52.97	−
Turnout		708	55.68	
Conservative hold		Swing		

Llangybi Fawr
Party	Candidate	Votes	%	±%
Conservative	Peter R. Clarke	537	74.48	−
Liberal Democrats	Martin Sutherland	184	25.52	−
Majority		353	48.96	−
Turnout		721	53.51	
Conservative hold		Swing		

Llanover
Party	Candidate	Votes	%	±%
Conservative	Brian R. Hood	773	75.71	−
Labour	Margaret M. R. Harris	133	13.03	−
Liberal Democrats	Stephen R. Poole	115	11.26	−
Majority		640	62.68	−
Turnout		1,021	56.32	
Conservative hold		Swing		

Llantilio Crossenny
Party	Candidate	Votes	%	±%
Conservative	Ruth Edwards	350	41.81	−
Independent	Christopher D. Lewis	290	34.64	−
Liberal Democrats	Drewe W. Lacey	66	7.89	−
Independent	Avice C. Field	66	7.89	−
Independent	Benjamin C. Herbet	65	7.77	−
Majority		60	7.20	−
Turnout		837	62.98	
Conservative hold		Swing		

Llanwenarth Ultra
Party	Candidate	Votes	%	±%
Labour	Verona M. R. Nelmes	266	41.69	−
Liberal Democrats	Peter A. Jones	205	32.13	−
Conservative	John G. Jones	167	26.18	−
Majority		61	9.56	−
Turnout		1,021	56.32	
Labour hold		Swing		

Magor with Undy, Mill
Party	Candidate	Votes	%	±%
Conservative	John Major	551	64.82	−
Labour	Nita S. Baicher	299	35.18	−
Majority		252	29.64	−
Turnout		850	40.62	
Conservative hold		Swing		

Magor with Undy, The Elms
Party	Candidate	Votes	%	±%
Labour	Olive G. Evans	262	30.32	−
UKIP	Victor G. Bashford	256	29.63	−
Conservative	Paul F. Cawley	194	22.45	−
Independent	Brian A. Burt	104	12.04	−
Plaid Cymru	Peter Howells-Meadowcroft	48	5.56	−
Majority		6	0.69	−
Turnout		864	36.68	
Labour hold		Swing		

Mardy
Party	Candidate	Votes	%	±%
Conservative	Nicholas (Nick) H. Ramsay	228	36.18	+7.82
Independent	Ralph F. Chapman	174	27.62	−1.96
Labour	Hazel E. Bennett	144	22.86	−7.21
Liberal Democrats	Charlotte Jones	51	8.10	−3.88
Plaid Cymru	Stuart K. Neale	33	5.24	+5.24
Majority		54	8.56	n/a
Turnout		630	46.82	
Conservative gain from Labour		Swing	-4.89	

Mitchel Troy
Party	Candidate	Votes	%	±%
Conservative	Geoffrey (Geoff) C. Burrows	313	53.60	+17.69
Liberal Democrats	Lesley M. Williams	271	46.40	−17.69
Majority		42	7.20	n/a
Turnout		721	53.51	
Conservative gain from Liberal Democrats		Swing	-8.85	

Monmouth, Dixton with Osbaston
Party	Candidate	Votes	%	±%
Liberal Democrats	Eileen J. Goodrich	554	52.56	−
Conservative	Richard (Dick) Le Gros Cass	500	47.44	−
Majority		54	5.12	−
Turnout		1054	57.82	
Liberal Democrats gain from Conservative		Swing		

Monmouth, Drybridge
Party	Candidate	Votes	%	±%
Conservative	Alan M. Wintle	384	46.66	−
Liberal Democrats	Lloyd Williams	327	39.73	−
Independent	Gary Witcombe	112	13.61	−
Majority		57	6.93	−
Turnout		823	43.43	
Conservative hold		Swing		

Monmouth, Overmonnow
Party	Candidate	Votes	%	±%
Conservative	Susan (Sue) White	282	39.72	−
Labour	Maureen Roach	235	33.10	−
Liberal Democrats	Richard J. Bond	135	19.01	−
Green	Ann Were	58	8.17	−
Majority		47	6.62	−
Turnout		710	40.15	
Conservative gain from Labour		Swing		

Monmouth, Wyesham
Party	Candidate	Votes	%	±%
Conservative	Elizabeth (Liz) J. Hacket-Pain	334	45.66	−
Labour	Marcus J. Roach	242	32.79	−
Liberal Democrats	Selwyn Roberts	118	15.99	−
Plaid Cymru	David J. Taylor	44	5.96	−
Majority		92	12.87	−
Turnout		738	45.20	
Conservative gain from Labour		Swing		

Portskewett
Party	Candidate	Votes	%	±%
Conservative	Peter A. Fox	505	66.71	−
Labour	Paul T. Wall	177	23.38	−
Liberal Democrats	Janet Ellard	75	9.91	−
Majority		328	43.33	−
Turnout		757	48.00	
Conservative hold		Swing		

Raglan
Party	Candidate	Votes	%	±%
Conservative	William A. L. Crump	621	74.02	−
Liberal Democrats	Martin Blakebrough	218	25.98	−
Majority		403	48.04	−
Turnout		839	55.72	
Conservative hold		Swing		

Rogiet
Party	Candidate	Votes	%	±%
Labour	Michael (Mike) R. Smith	347	58.11	−
Independent	Gerald P. Robbins	204	34.18	−
Conservative	Margaret Lawrence	46	7.71	−
Majority		143	23.93	−
Turnout		597	46.95	
Labour gain from Independent		Swing		

Shirenewton
Party	Candidate	Votes	%	±%
Conservative	Graham L. Down	655	68.51	−
Liberal Democrats	Pamela (Pam) A. Johnston	173	18.10	−
Labour	Phyllis R. Higginson	128	13.39	−
Majority		482	50.41	−
Turnout		956	57.30	
Conservative hold		Swing		

St. Arvans
Party	Candidate	Votes	%	±%
Conservative	Ann E. Webb	378	61.87	−
Independent	Anthony (Tony) J. Newman	131	21.44	−
Liberal Democrats	Jane M. J. Robbins	102	16.69	−
Majority		247	40.43	−
Turnout		611	52.52	
Conservative hold		Swing		

Trellech United
Party	Candidate	Votes	%	±%
Independent	Ashley Thomas	551	51.54	+1.67
Conservative	Duncan N. Armstrong	418	36.76	−1.44
Liberal Democrats	Linda Campbell	168	14.78	+2.85
Majority		133	14.78	+3.11
Turnout		1,137	54.03	
Independent hold		Swing	+1.56	

Usk
Party	Candidate	Votes	%	±%
Conservative	Edmund J. Harrhy	669	65.52	+0.90
Labour	Sandrina Gay	204	19.98	−5.90
Liberal Democrats	Alison L. Willott	148	14.50	+5.00
Majority		465	45.54	+6.8
Turnout		1,021	58.87	
Conservative hold		Swing	+3.4	
