= 2012 Monmouthshire County Council election =

2012 Welsh local government election

Results of the 2012 Monmouthshire County Council election

The 2012 Monmouthshire County Council Election took place on 3 May 2012 in Wales to elect members of Monmouthshire County Council. It was held on the same day as other 2012 United Kingdom local elections, and the Council shifted from Conservative to No Overall Control. The election was preceded by the 2008 elections and followed by the 2017 elections.

Below you can see the final results of the election.

== Results ==
2012 Monmouthshire Council Election
| Party | Seats | Gains | Losses | Net gain/loss | Seats % | Votes % | Votes | +/− |
|---|---|---|---|---|---|---|---|---|
| Conservative | 19 | | | -10 | 44.2 | 36.1 | 8,572 | -12.1 |
| Labour | 11 | | | +4 | 25.6 | 29.7 | 7,041 | +14.0 |
| Independent | 10 | | | +9 | 23.3 | 23.8 | 5,637 | +14.0 |
| Liberal Democrats | 3 | | | -2 | 7.0 | 7.5 | 1,785 | -13.5 |
| Plaid Cymru | 0 | | | -1 | 0.0 | 2.4 | 567 | -1.5 |
| Green | 0 | | | 0 | 0.0 | 0.5 | 130 | -0.1 |
| Retired Teacher | - | - | - | - | - | - | - | -0.7 |
