= Glyn y Marl =

- Electoral ward
- Population: 7,686 (2021 census)
- Community: Conwy
- Principal area: Conwy County Borough
- Country: Wales
- Sovereign state: United Kingdom
- Post town: LLANDUDNO JUNCTION
- Postcode district: LL31
- Dialling code: 01492
- UK Parliament: Bangor Aberconwy
- Councillors: 3

Glyn y Marl is an electoral ward in Conwy County Borough, Wales. It covers the town of Llandudno Junction in the community of Conwy. It was created in 2022.

== Description ==
The Glyn y Marl electoral ward was created following a ward boundary review, which recommended the merger of the former Marl ward with the neighbouring Pensarn ward. Because these two wards covered the urban area of Llandudno Junction, it was initially proposed to name the new ward after the town. However, Conwy County Borough Council suggested an alternative name that was traditional to the area, and it was agreed to call the ward Glyn y Marl in both English and Welsh. The new arrangements were effective from the 2022 Conwy County Borough Council election.

The ward had a electorate of 5,708.

== Representatives ==
Glyn y Marl elects three county borough councillors to Conwy County Borough Council.

At the county borough election on 5 May 2022, the ward elected Independent Mike Priestley, Labour's Dave Jones and Liberal Democrat Sue Shotter.

In May 2023 Jones received a complaint from a constituent after posting a song called "Kill the King" on his personal Facebook page, shortly after the coronation of Coronation of King Charles III. In May 2025 Jones left the Labour Party, citing differences with Welsh Labour and UK Labour. He decided to sit as a representative of the Citizens First Alliance.

== Elections ==
=== 2022 ===
Conwy County Borough Council election, 5 May 2022
Party	Candidate	Votes	%	±%
Independent	Mike Priestly	1,366		N/A
Labour	Dave Jones	770		N/A
Liberal Democrats	Sue Shotter	724		N/A
Labour	Trevor McGuinness	479		N/A
Conservative	Helen Roberts	463		N/A
Conservative	Gareth Probert	453		N/A
Plaid Cymru	Clare Parry	445		N/A
Plaid Cymru	Keren Bond	366		N/A
Conservative	Evie Roberts	351		N/A
Liberal Democrats	Pat Hart	321		N/A
Green	Iain Moore	157		N/A
Turnout		2,256	38.1	N/A
Independent win (new seat)				
Labour win (new seat)				
Liberal Democrats win (new seat)				

Priestly and Shotter had previously been councillors for the Marl ward.
