= Morawelon =

Area and community ward in Holyhead, Wales

Coordinates: 53.305°N 4.621°W

Morawelon: Welsh: Môrawelon
- Location within Anglesey
- OS grid reference: SH254819
  - Cardiff: 140.2 mi (225.6 km)
  - London: 226.6 mi (364.7 km)
- Community: Caergybi
- Principal area: Anglesey
- Country: Wales
- Sovereign state: United Kingdom
- Post town: Caergybi
- Police: North Wales
- Fire: North Wales
- Ambulance: Welsh
- UK Parliament: Ynys Môn
- Senedd Cymru – Welsh Parliament: Ynys Môn

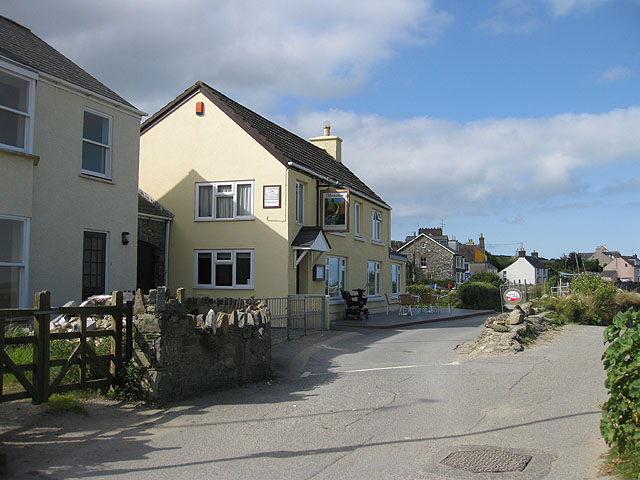
Morawelon urban view

Morawelon (Welsh: Môrawelon) is an area and community electoral ward in the town of Holyhead, Anglesey, Wales.

In 2011 the ward had a population of 1,504.

The Eaton Electrical factory was based in Morawelon from 1961. When its closure was announced, to relocate to Eastern Europe with the loss of 265 jobs, nobody other than the workforce led the fight (unsuccessfully) to keep the factory open. It was to close by December 2009.

== Electoral ward ==
Until 2012 the electoral ward sent a councillor to the Isle of Anglesey County Council. Following the Isle of Anglesey electoral boundary changes Morawelon became part of a larger Caergybi ward, which includes three other wards of the Holyhead community. It remains a community ward for the Holyhead Town Council.

From the 1995 elections the county ward generally elected a Labour Party county councillor, with the exception of the 2004 election when the previously Labour councillor, (John) Arwel Roberts, stood as an independent candidate.

== See also ==
- List of built-up areas in Wales by population
