= Ynys Gybi (electoral ward) =

Electoral ward in Anglesey, Wales

Ynys Gybi is an electoral ward in the west of Anglesey, Wales, created in 2012. It covers the most part of Holy Island, whose name is Ynys Gybi in Welsh.

== Description ==
Ynys Gybi ward covers the six mile length of Holy Island, from North Stack in the north, to Rhoscolyn in the south. It includes the communities of Trearddur and Rhoscolyn, as well as the Holyhead town wards of Maeshyfryd and Kingsland (the remainder of Holyhead forms the neighbouring county ward of Caergybi). The Ynys Gybi ward elects three county councillors to the Isle of Anglesey County Council.

The Ynys Gybi ward was created following the Isle of Anglesey electoral boundary changes in 2012, which created 11 multi-councillor wards from 40 single-councillor wards. The new ward replaced the former county wards of Kingsland, Maeshyfryd and Trearddur, which had each elected one county councillor.

According to the 2011 UK Census the combined total population of Kingsland, Maeshyfryd and Trearddur was 6,039.

== Elections results ==
=== 2013 ===
During the campaign of the inaugural May 2013 county elections, former Holyhead mayor Jeff Evans campaigned using the family caravan because of "the sheer size" of the 6-mile long ward. Evans succeeded in being elected as an independent councillor, together with Plaid Cymru's Trefor Lloyd Hughes and another Independent, Dafydd Rhys Thomas. The turnout was 45.7%.

=== 2017 ===
At the May 2017 county elections, Councillor Jeff Evans lost his seat to the Labour Party's Arwel Roberts. Councillors Hughes and Thomas retained their seats.

2017 Isle of Anglesey County Council election
Party	Candidate	Votes	%	±%
Independent	Dafydd Rhys Thomas *	890	21.0	+8.0
Plaid Cymru	Trefor Lloyd Hughes *	753	18.0	+3.0
Labour	John Arwel Roberts	641	15.0	N/A
Independent	Jeffrey Maurice Evans *	585	14.0	+2.0
Labour	William John Chorlton	550	13.0	+3.0
Conservative	Philip Michael Eastment	458	11.0	+4.0
Independent	Anwen Davies McCann	370	9.0	N/A
Turnout			43.0	−3.0
Independent hold		Swing		
Plaid Cymru hold		Swing		
Labour gain from Independent		Swing		

=== 2026 by-election ===
Reform UK gain from Plaid Cymru.
