= Parc a'r Mynydd =

Area and community ward in Holyhead, UK

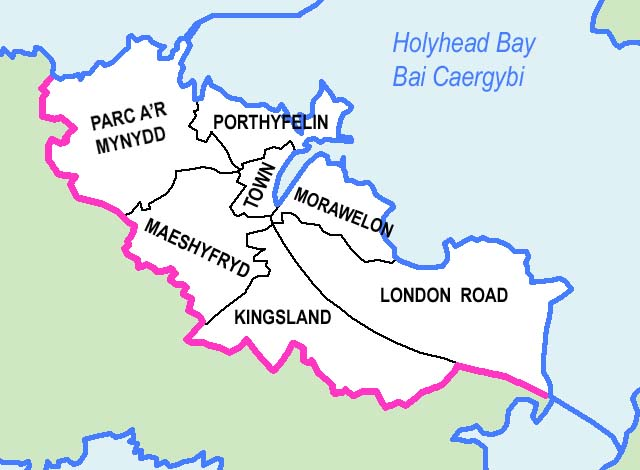
Wards in Holyhead, including Parc a'r Mynydd to the north

Parc a'r Mynydd (meaning Park and the Mountain) is an area and community electoral ward in the town of Holyhead, Anglesey, Wales.

The area includes Breakwater Country Park and the village of Mountain (at the foot of Holyhead Mountain).

In 2011 the ward had a total population of 1,154.

== Electoral ward ==
Parc a'r Mynydd remains an electoral ward for Holyhead Town Council, electing two town councillors.

Until 2012 the Parc a'r Mynydd electoral ward sent a county councillor to the Isle of Anglesey County Council. Following the Isle of Anglesey electoral boundary changes Parc a'r Mynydd became part of a larger Caergybi ward, which includes three other wards of the Holyhead community.

From the 1999 elections the county ward elected Independent county councillors. Ice cream salesman John Victor "JV" Owen was county councillor from 1995 to 1999 (for the Labour Party) and 2008-2013 (as an independent). He was also chairman of the Isle of Anglesey County Council and mayor of Holyhead.
