= Holyhead Town Council =

Community council in Anglesey, Wales

Holyhead Town Council Cyngor Tref Caergybi

Type
- Type: Town council

Leadership
- Mayor: Vaughan Williams (2024/25)
- Seats: 16

Meeting place
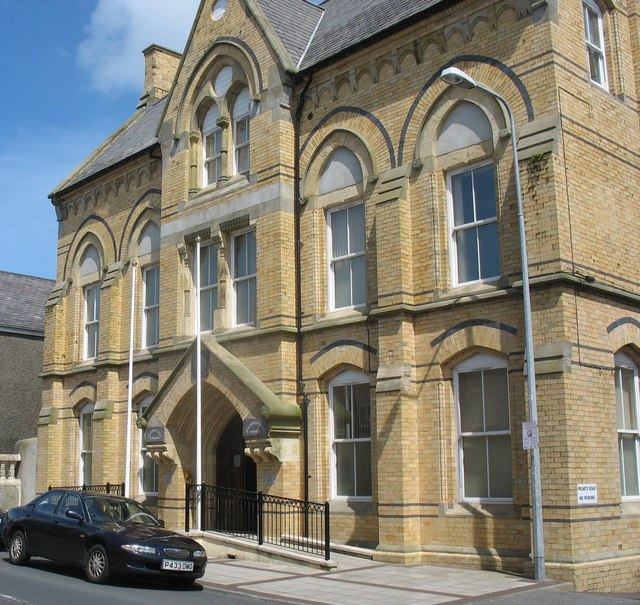
- Holyhead Town Hall, Newry Street, Holyhead (Welsh: Neuadd y Dref Caergybi)

Website
- www.holyheadtowncouncil.com

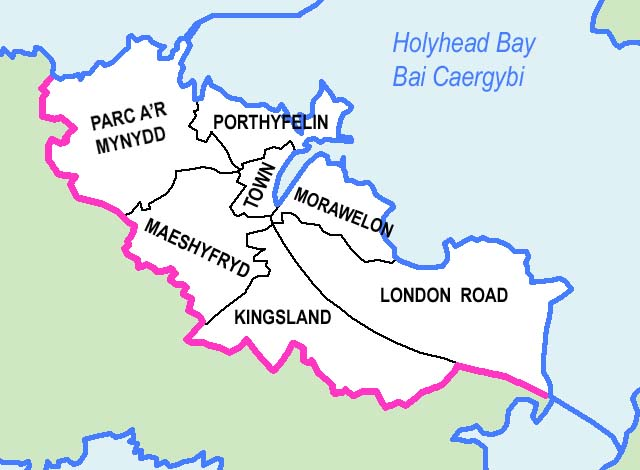
Wards in Holyhead

Holyhead Town Council is an elected community council serving the town of Holyhead in Anglesey, Wales.

== Background ==
Holyhead Town Council was created in 1974 with the demise of Holyhead Urban District Council and the transfer of many of its powers to Anglesey Borough Council (later Isle of Anglesey County Council).

The town council's responsibilities include maintaining the town's six playing fields, Maeshyfryd Cemetery, allotments, bus shelters, noticeboards, as well as the left luggage facilities at the port. The council manages the Town Hall and has leased the old Empire Cinema building to create a Soft Play Centre and a Laser Quest for children. In 2017 the Town Council took over Holyhead's Pavilion and park from Anglesey County Council. By January 2019 a skatepark, as well as a bike track, tennis and basketball courts and bowling greens had been made available to the public.

=== Dissolution threat ===
Despite being commended by auditors, in 2013 the town council was threatened with a call for its dissolution, by campaigners including Newry Waterfront Action Group. They claimed the town council didn't represent the views of the town on major development projects. Parc a'r Mynydd councillor Shaun Redmond resigned in May 2016 to support the campaign. In November 2016 the Wales Audit Office and the Public Service Ombudsman for Wales rejected Redmond's accusations of corruption and decided there was no evidence of criminality.

== Representation ==
Sixteen councillors are elected from the seven community electoral wards in the town, namely: Kingsland (2), Ffordd Llundain/London Road (2), Maeshyfryd (3), Morawelon (2), Parc a'r Mynydd (2), Porth Y felin (3) and Town (2).

== Mayor ==
The council elects a mayor and deputy mayor annually.
