= 2017 Monmouthshire County Council election =

Local election in Wales

- 4 May 2017

All 43 seats to Monmouthshire County Council 22 seats needed for a majority
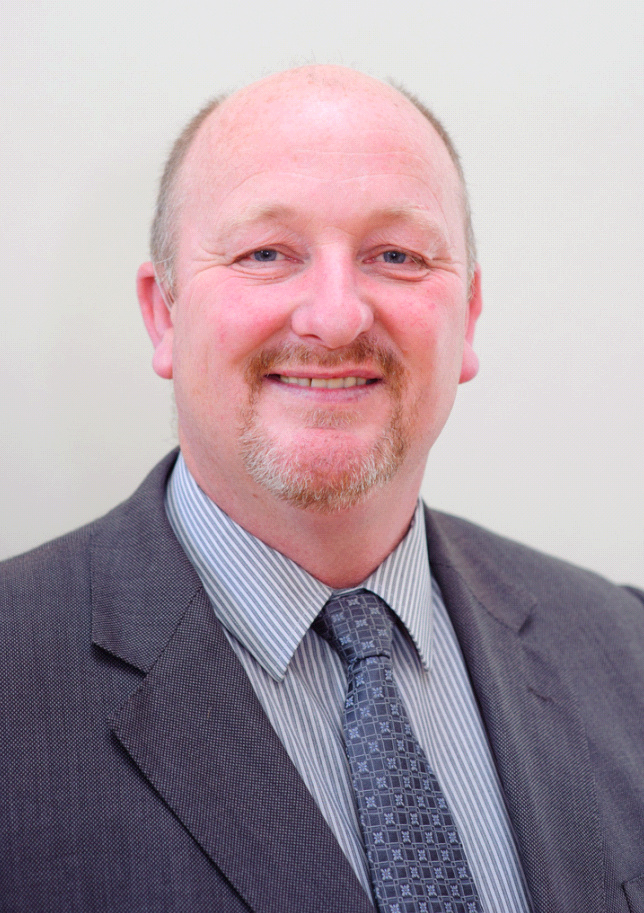
| | First party | Second party |
|---|---|---|
| Leader | Peter Fox |
| Party | Conservative | Labour |
| Leader's seat | Portskewett |
| Last election | 19 seats | 11 seats |
| Seats won | 25 | 10 |
| Seat change | ▲6 | ▼1 |
| Swing | ▲ | ▲ |
| | Third party | Fourth party |
| Party | Independent | Liberal Democrats |
| Last election | 10 seats | 3 seats |
| Seats won | 5 | 3 |
| Seat change | ▼5 | 0 |
| Swing | ▼ |
- Results of the 2017 Monmouthshire County Council election

An election to Monmouthshire County Council took place on 4 May 2017 as part of the 2017 Welsh local elections. 43 councillors were to be elected from both single-member and dual-member electoral divisions by first-past-the-post for a five-year term of office. The elections were preceded by the 2012 elections and followed by the 2022 elections.

== Results ==
Following the election, the Conservative Party regained control of the council, with 25 seats (an increase of six). Labour finished on 10 seats (down from 11) while five Independents and three Liberal Democrats also won seats.

The Liberal Democrat deputy council leader lost his seat in the Larkfield ward after 13 years as a councillor. In the Priory ward there were three recounts before Labour candidate, Tudor Thomas, was declared winner over the sitting Conservative councillor by three votes.
