= St Mary's (Chepstow ward) =

Coordinates: 51.641°N 2.672°W

- Electoral ward
- Location within Monmouthshire
- Population: 1,847 (2011 census)
- Community: Chepstow
- Principal area: Monmouthshire
- Country: Wales
- Sovereign state: United Kingdom
- UK Parliament: Monmouth
- Senedd Cymru – Welsh Parliament: Monmouth
- Councillors: 1 (County), 3 (Town)

St Mary's is an electoral ward in the town of Chepstow, Monmouthshire, Wales. The ward elects councillors to Chepstow Town Council and Monmouthshire County Council.

== Description ==
The St Mary's ward covers the town centre of the Chepstow, which includes the Priory parish church of the same name. The ward is bordered to the north and east by the River Wye (and the England border). To the west is Chepstow's St Kingsmark ward and to the south are the Chepstow wards of Larkfield and St Christopher's.

According to the 2001 UK Census the population of the St Mary's ward was 1,741, rising to 1,847 by 2011.

== Town Council elections ==
St Mary's is a community ward for elections to Chepstow Town Council. The St Mary's ward elects or co-opts three town councillors to the town council.

== County Council elections ==
St Mary's is a county electoral ward for elections to Monmouthshire County Council, represented by one county councillor. At the 1995 and 1999 elections the ward elected a Labour Party councillor. The 2004 and 2008 elections were won by the Liberal Democrats, though Labour's Peter Farley won the following 2012 election. At the May 2017 elections Jez Becker won the seat back for the Liberal Democrats.

2017 Monmouthshire County Council election
Party	Candidate	Votes	%	±%
Liberal Democrats	Jeremy Becker	244		
Conservative	Marc Le Peltier	214		
Labour	Dale Rooke	176		
