= Kingsland, Anglesey =

Area of Holyhead, Anglesey, Wales

Coordinates: 53.301109°N 4.629258°W

Welsh: Penllechnêst
- Location within Anglesey
- OS grid reference: SH 2489 8146
  - Cardiff: 140 mi (230 km)
  - London: 226.6 mi (364.7 km)
- Community: Holyhead
- Principal area: Anglesey
- Country: Wales
- Sovereign state: United Kingdom
- Post town: Holyhead
- Police: North Wales
- Fire: North Wales
- Ambulance: Welsh
- UK Parliament: Ynys Môn
- Senedd Cymru – Welsh Parliament: Ynys Môn

Kingsland is an area in the community of Holyhead, Anglesey, Wales.

It is also a community electoral ward for the town, electing two councillors to Holyhead Town Council. Prior to the Isle of Anglesey electoral boundary changes in 2012 Kingsland was also a ward for the Isle of Anglesey County Council, electing a county councillor. It was traditionally represented by the Labour Party. After 2012 it became part of the Ynys Gybi county ward.

According to the 2011 UK Census the population of Kingsland was 1,525.

== Etymology ==
Then name was given to the area in 1821, when King George visited the town. He continued on to Ireland, where his visit saw the town of Dunleary renamed Kingstown in his honour; it kept the name until 1920, when it was once again given its original name in its Irish form, Dún Laoghaire. Evidence taken from 18th century letters shows that the Kingsland area of Holyhead was previously called Penllechnêst.
