= Maeshyfryd, Anglesey =

Area of Holyhead, Wales

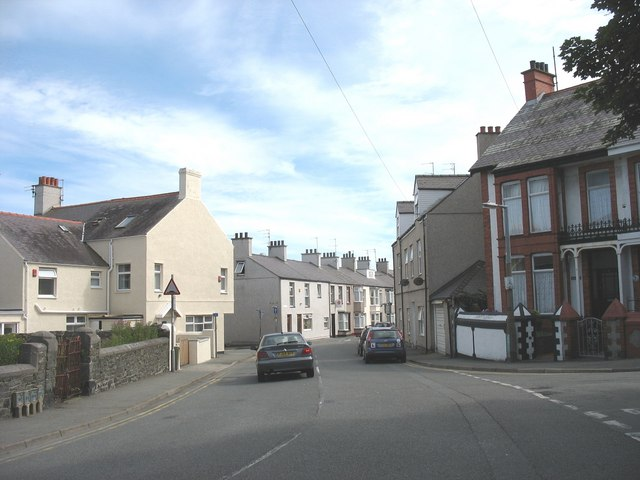
Junction of Maes-hyfryd Road and Plas Road

Maeshyfryd is an area southwest of the port and town centre of Holyhead in Anglesey, Wales. It was formerly an electoral ward to the county council.

The area is the location for the town's main cemetery, Maeshyfryd Cemetery, which dates from the 1870s.

Prior to the 2012 Anglesey electoral boundary changes Maeshyfryd was an electoral ward to the Isle of Anglesey County Council. It generally elected a Plaid Cymru county councillor, with the exception of the 2004 election when the Plaid Cymru councillor lost to the Labour Party candidate. Maeshyfryd is now part of the larger Caergybi ward though it continues to be a community ward for Holyhead Town Council.

According to the 2011 UK Census the population of Maeshyfryd was 2,286.
