= Larkfield (electoral ward) =

Coordinates: 51.635°N 2.679°W

- Electoral ward
- Location within Monmouthshire
- Population: 2,014 (2011 census)
- Community: Chepstow
- Principal area: Monmouthshire
- Country: Wales
- Sovereign state: United Kingdom
- UK Parliament: Monmouth
- Senedd Cymru – Welsh Parliament: Monmouth
- Councillors: 1 (County), 3 (Town)

Larkfield is an electoral ward in Chepstow, Monmouthshire. The ward elects councillors to Chepstow Town Council and Monmouthshire County Council.

The ward covers an area to the southwest of the town centre, comprising the northern part of Bulwark and the area south of Chepstow Community Hospital and Mounton Road.

According to the 2001 UK Census the population of the ward was 1,966, increasing to 2,014 by the 2011 UK Census.

== Town Council elections ==
Up to three town councillors are elected or co-opted from the Larkfield ward to Chepstow Town Council.

Larkfield town councillor, Paul Pavia, was elected mayor of Chepstow for 2016/17.

== County Council elections ==
Larkfield elects one county councillor to Monmouthshire County Council. At the May 2017 elections the ward was won by Paul Pavia for the Conservative Party. The losing candidate, Phil Hobson of the Liberal Democrats, had been ward councillor since 2004 and most recently deputy leader of the county council.

Prior to 2004 the ward had been won by the Conservatives in 1999 and the Labour Party in 1995.

== See also ==
- St Mary's (Chepstow ward)
