= Wards and electoral divisions of the United Kingdom =

Electoral districts at sub-national level represented by one or more councillors

Electoral areas
- Category: Electoral district
- Location: United Kingdom
- Created by: Statutory instrument
- Possible types: Wards; Electoral divisions; Electoral wards

The wards and electoral divisions in the United Kingdom are electoral districts at sub-national level, represented by one or more councillors. The ward is the primary unit of English electoral geography for civil parishes and borough and district councils, the electoral ward is the unit used by Welsh principal councils, while the electoral division is the unit used by English county councils and some unitary authorities. Each ward/division has an average electorate of about 5,500 people, but ward population counts can vary substantially. As of 2021 there are 8,694 electoral wards/divisions in the UK. An average area of wards or electoral divisions in the United Kingdom is 28.109 km^{2} (10.853 sq mi).

== England ==
The London boroughs, metropolitan boroughs and non-metropolitan districts (including most unitary authorities) are divided into wards for local elections. However, county council elections (as well as those for most unitary councils which were formerly county councils, such as the North Yorkshire, Somerset, Isle of Wight and Shropshire Councils) instead use the term electoral division. In non-metropolitan county areas with both wards (used for district council elections) and electoral divisions (used for county council elections), the boundaries of the two types of divisions may sometimes not coincide, but more often the county electoral divisions will be made up of one or more complete wards.

In urban areas, the wards within a local authority area typically each contain roughly the same number of electors, and each elect three councillors. In local authorities with mixed urban and rural areas, the number of councillors may vary from one to three, depending on the size of the electorate. Where civil parishes exist, a ward can be adjacent with a civil parish or consist of groups of civil parishes. Larger civil parishes (such as Shrewsbury) can be divided into two or more wards.

=== City of London ===
The City of London has its own sui generis form of local government and is divided into wards, which are ancient and very long-standing sub-divisions of the city.

=== Isles of Scilly ===
The Council of the Isles of Scilly is also a sui generis unitary authority, and has five wards, each returning either 1 or (in the case of St Mary's) 12 councillors to the Council of the Isles of Scilly.

=== Civil parishes ===
Civil parishes in England are sometimes divided into wards for elections to the parish council (or town/city council). They need not bear any relation to wards or electoral divisions at district level, but often do.

=== Historic use ===
The four most northerly ancient counties of England – Cumberland, Westmorland, County Durham and Northumberland – were historically divided into administrative units called wards instead of hundreds or wapentakes, as in other counties. Wards were areas originally organised for military purposes, each centred on a castle.

=== London Assembly ===
The London Assembly has 14 constituencies, each returning one constituency member determined by an election for each constituency. There is an additional constituency returning 11 additional members, determined by a proportional London-wide vote, where the constituency members are deducted.

== Wales ==
In Wales, the term electoral ward is used for elections to principal councils (county councils or county borough councils). These were formally called electoral divisions.

Communities in Wales (the equivalent to the civil parish in England) are sometimes divided into wards for elections to the community council.

== Scotland ==
All of Scotland is divided into over 300 wards for local government elections. Using the single transferable vote, most wards elect either three or four councillors. Starting from the 2022 Scottish local elections, the Scottish Elections (Reform) Act 2020, allows electoral wards to have between one and five councillors.

== Northern Ireland ==
Districts in Northern Ireland are divided into electoral areas, with each electing between five and seven councillors by single transferable vote. These are themselves sub-divided into wards, but these wards have no official function. Post-1973 wards were first created by the Local Government (Boundaries) (Northern Ireland) Order 1972 and DEAs were first created by the Local Government (District Electoral Areas) Regulations 1973.

== See also ==
- List of electoral wards in England by constituency
- List of electoral wards in Wales
