= Caergybi (electoral ward) =

Electoral ward in Anglesey, Wales

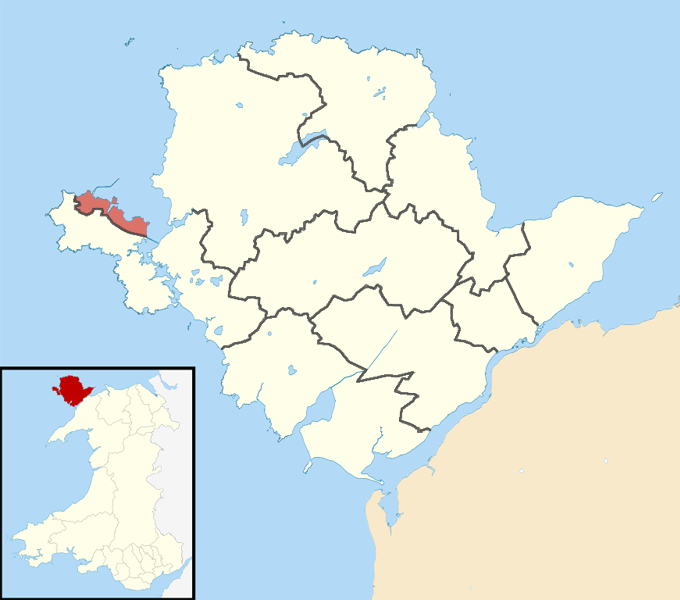
Caergybi ward location on Anglesey

Caergybi is an electoral ward in Holyhead, Anglesey, Wales. It includes the northern half of the community including the town centre and port. Caergybi elects three county councillors to the Isle of Anglesey County Council. Caergybi includes the community wards of Town, London Road, Morawelon, Porthafelin and Parc a'r Mynydd, which elect representatives to Holyhead Town Council.

According to the 2011 UK Census the combined total population of Holyhead Town, London Road, Morawelon, Porthafelin and Parc a'r mynydd was 7,620.

Caergybi was created following the Isle of Anglesey electoral boundary changes in 2012. Prior to this, Holyhead Town, London Road, Morawelon, Porthafelin and Parc a'r mynydd were each county wards and elected their own county councillor.

== Election results ==
2017 Isle of Anglesey County Council election
Party	Candidate	Votes	%	±%
Independent	Bob Llewelyn Jones	1049	21.0	+2.0
Independent	Shaun James Redmond	673	13.5	
Labour	Glyn Haynes	625	12.5	
Plaid Cymru	Keith Thomas	559	11.2	
Labour	Alan Williams	540	10.8	
Labour	Beryl Warner	515	10.3	
Plaid Cymru	Ken Taylor	391	7.8	
Independent	Ken Tatlock	369	7.4	
Conservative	Philip Michael Eastment	261	5.2	+3.0
Turnout			40.0	−8.0
Independent hold		Swing		
Independent hold		Swing		
Labour gain from Independent		Swing		

2013 Isle of Anglesey County Council election
Party	Candidate	Votes	%	±%
Independent	Raymond Jones	1365	23.7	
Independent	Bob Llewelyn Jones	1094	19.0	
Independent	Arwel Roberts	751	13.0	
Independent	Beryl Warner	747	13.0	
UKIP	Afryl Davies	637	19.0	
Independent	Alan Williams	574	11.1	
Plaid Cymru	Jean Williams	324	10.0	
Conservative	John Coates	135	2.3	
Conservative	Philip Eastment	128	2.2	
Turnout			48.0	N/A

== See also ==
- Ynys Gybi (electoral ward)
