= List of Sites of Special Scientific Interest in Flintshire =

Map of Flintshire within Wales

This is a list of the Sites of Special Scientific Interest (SSSIs) in the Flintshire Area of Search (AoS).

== Sites ==
- Afon Dyfrdwy (River Dee) SSSI
- Alyn Valley Woods and Alyn Gorge Caves
- Buckley Claypits and Commons
- Caerwys Tufa
- Cefn Meadow
- Cambrian Quarry (Chwarel Cambrian), Gwernymynydd
- Coed Talon Marsh
- Coed Trefraith
- Connah's Quay Ponds and Woodland
- Ddol Uchaf
- Dee Estuary
- Gronant Dunes and Talacre Warren
- Halkyn Common and Holywell Grasslands
- Hendre Bach
- Herward Smithy
- Inner Marsh Farm
- Llandegla Moor (in both Denbighshire and Flintshire)
- Maes y Grug
- Mynydd y Fflint (Flint Mountain)
- Parc Bodlondeb and Gwenallt-parc, Lixwm
- Parc Linden, Lixwm
- Pen-y-Cefn Pasture
- Shotton Lagoons and Reedbeds
- Teilia Quarry
- Tyddyn-y-barcut
