= List of Sites of Special Scientific Interest in Denbighshire =

Map of Denbighshire within Wales

This is a list of the Sites of Special Scientific Interest (SSSIs) in the Denbighshire Area of Search (AoS).

== Sites ==
- Afon Dyfrdwy (River Dee) SSSI
- Alyn Valley Woods and Alyn Gorge Caves
- Berwyn
- Bryn Alyn
- Caeau Pen-y-coed
- Cefn Rofft
- Cambrian Quarry (Chwarel Cambrian), Gwernymynydd
- Chwarel Pant Glas
- Cil-y-groeslwyd Woods, Eyarth Woods & Rocks & Craig Adwy-wynt
- Clogau Quarry
- Coed Nant Mawr
- Coedydd ac Ogofau Elwy a Meirchion
- Coedydd Dyffryn Alwen
- Crest Mawr Wood
- Cynwyd Forest Quarry
- Dee Estuary
- Dinas Bran
- Ffynnon Beuno and Cae Gwyn Caves
- Graig Fawr
- Graig Quarry
- Graig, Llanarmon-yn-Ial
- Gronant Dunes and Talacre Warren
- Hendre Bach
- Llandegla Moor (in both Denbighshire and Flintshire)
- Llwyn
- Maes Hiraddug
- Moel Hiraddug Quarries
- Mwyngloddfa Pennant
- Mynydd Hiraethog
- Penarth Quarry
- Prestatyn Hillside
- Ruabon/Llantysilio Mountains and Minera
