= List of Sites of Special Scientific Interest in Wrexham County Borough =

Map of Wrexham within Wales

This is a list of the Sites of Special Scientific Interest (SSSIs) in the Wrexham Area of Search (AoS).

== Sites ==
- Afon Dyfrdwy (River Dee) SSSI
- Berwyn
- Chirk Castle and Parkland
- Chwarel Singret
- Cloy Brook Pastures
- Coedwig Ffosil Brymbo Fossil Forest
- Fenn's, Whixall, Bettisfield, Wem and Cadney Mosses
- Gatewen Marsh
- Hanmer Mere
- Llay Bog
- Llyn Bedydd
- Marford Quarry
- Nant-y-Belan and Prynela Woods
- Old Pulford Brook Meadows
- Pandy Quarries
- Ruabon/Llantysilio Mountains and Minera
- Shell Brook Pastures
- Sontley Marsh
- Stryt Las a'r Hafod
- Vicarage Moss
