= List of Sites of Special Scientific Interest in Conwy County Borough =

Map of Conwy within Wales

This is a list of the Sites of Special Scientific Interest (SSSIs) in the Conwy Area of Search (AoS).

== Sites ==
- Aber Afon Conwy
- Afon Conwy Pastures
- Benarth Wood
- Blaen y Wergloedd Bog
- Bryn Euryn
- Bwlch Mine
- Cadnant
- Cae'r Felin
- Ceunant Dulyn
- Chwythlyn
- Coed Cae Awr
- Coed Dolgarrog
- Coed Ffordd-las
- Coed Gorswen
- Coed Llys-Aled
- Coed Merchlyn
- Coed Nant-y-Merddyn-uchaf
- Coed y Gopa
- Coedydd Aber
- Coedydd ac Ogofau Elwy a Meirchion
- Coedydd Derw Elwy
- Coedydd Dyffryn Alwen
- Cors Geuallt
- Corsydd Nug a Merddwr
- Creigiau Rhiwledyn (Little Ormes Head)
- Creuddyn
- Degannwy Quarries and Grassland
- Eidda Pastures
- Eryri
- Fairy Glen Woods
- Llanddulas Limestone and Gwrych Castle Wood
- Llyn Bychan
- Llyn Creiniog
- Llyn Goddionduon
- Llyn Ty'n y Llyn
- Llyn Ty'n y Mynydd
- Llyn y Fawnog
- Llynnau Bodgynydd
- Migneint - Arenig - Dduallt
- Morfa Uchaf, Dyffryn Conwy
- Mosshill
- Mwyngloddiau a chreigiau Gwydyr
- Mynydd Hiraethog
- Mynydd Marian
- Pandora Reservoirs
- Pen y Gogarth - Great Ormes Head
- Plas Iolyn Bog
- Plas Maenan
- Pont Bancog
- Sychnant Pass
- Traeth Lafan
- Traeth Pensarn
- Ty'n-y-ffordd Quarry
- Y Glyn Diffwys
