= Hendre =

Hendre is an old Welsh word meaning "old town" ('hen' meaning old and 'tref' meaning town, which is mutated to 'dref' and has the f dropped, as is common in Welsh; also spelt hendref). The name may refer to:

== Places in Wales ==
- Hendre (Bangor electoral ward), an electoral division in Bangor
- Hendre, Llanddyfnan, an area of Llandyfnan, Anglesey
- Hendre, Llangedwyn, a Site of Special Scientific interest in Clwyd
- The Hendre, a country house in Monmouthshire
- Hendre Bach, a Site of Special Scientific interest in Clwyd
- Hendre, an area and electoral division in Pencoed, Bridgend
- Hendre Hall, near Penrhyndeudraeth, Gwynedd, Wales

== Elsewhere ==
- Ysgol yr Hendre (Hendre School), Argentina
