= Coed Nant Mawr =

Protected area in Clwyd, Wales

Welsh: Coed Nant Mawr Nant Mawr Woods
- Site of Special Scientific Interest
- Location within Wales
- Location of Welsh: Coed Nant Mawr; Nant Mawr Woods.
- Area of search: Clwyd
- Grid reference: SJ0784962106
- Coordinates: 53.148095°N 3.3792966°W
- Interest: Wildlife
- Area: 20.93 hectares (0.2093 km^{2}; 0.08081 sq mi)
- Notification date: 22 November 1985

Coed Nant Mawr is a Site of Special Scientific Interest in the preserved county of Clwyd, north Wales. It is near to the town of Denbigh.

The site is protected under statute by Natural Resources Wales under its ID 966 and code 31WDG and is one of 29 designated SSSIs in Denbighshire.

== Description ==
Coed Nant Mawr lies on both sides of the steeply valley cut by the Nant Mawr river, a tributary of the River Clywedog. The woods grown on soils over Silurian rocks of the Ludlow Series, although the eastern end of the site there are outcrops of Carboniferous limestones.

== Flora and fauna ==
Coed Nant Mawr's southern and eastern woodlands are dominated by a mixture of ash, wych elm and sessile oak with some sycamore. There has been very little grazing in these areas and this has allowed shrub layer, dominated by hazel but mixed with hawthorn, holly and, patchily, guelder rose and spindle to develop. There is also a diverse ground flora, dominated by dog's mercury, although this is replaced in some areas by greater woodrush . The site is noted as a locality where herb paris grows. In the northwestern section of the wood the soil is more acidic and sessile oak dominates, with the odd downy birch. Here wavy hair-grass grows, alongside hard-fern, ling and wood sage. Damper areas next to the stream are home to a plant assemblage which includes great horsetail, meadow-sweet and opposite-leaved golden saxifrage. There was an incident in 2015 when the stream was blocked and up to 3,000 fish died, these includedsaalmon, sea trout, brown trout, eels and bullheads.

== See also ==
- List of Sites of Special Scientific Interest in Clwyd
- Edward Lhuyd
