= Graig =

Graig (in Welsh "rock") may refer to:

== Places ==
- Graig, Newport, an electoral ward and coterminous community of Newport, South Wales
- Graig, Pontypridd, a historic district of Pontypridd, South Wales
- Graig, Llanarmon-yn-Ial, a Site of Special Scientific Interest in Clwyd, North Wales

== People ==
- Graig Nettles (born 1944), American baseball player
- Graig Newman (born 1989), Canadian football player
