= Llwyn =

Protected area in Clwyd, Wales

Coordinates: 53.168°N 3.373°W

Llwyn is a Site of Special Scientific Interest in the preserved county of Clwyd, north Wales. It consists of two blocks of alder woodland at grid reference SJ 083 643 and SJ 082 649, about 2 miles (3 km) south-east of Denbigh and just north of the village of Llanrhaeadr. The site is on the floodplain of the Rivers Clywedog and Clwyd, and includes peat beds and swamps. It was notified in 1983 and 2001. Part of the site, some 9 acres (3.6 ha), is owned by the Woodland Trust and operated as a nature reserve.

== See also ==
- List of Sites of Special Scientific Interest in Clwyd
