= Pen-y-Cefn Pasture =

Protected area in Clwyd, Wales

Pen-y-Cefn Pasture (Welsh: Dolydd Pen-y-Cefn) is a Site of Special Scientific Interest in Cilcain, Flintshire, in the preserved county of Clwyd, north Wales. It has been an SSSI since 10 December 1986 as a conservation attempt to protect and preserve the site. Its area is 2.35 hectares. Natural Resources Wales is the body responsible for the site.

== Site ==
The site is protected under the Wildlife and Countryside Act 1981 which covers sites containing wildlife or geographical features or landforms of special importance. This site has been designated for its wildlife, i.e., taxonomic groups such as birds, butterflies, lizards, reptiles or insects. Wildlife sites are usually concerned with the continuation and development of the environment such as is afforded by traditional pasture.

== See also ==
- List of Sites of Special Scientific Interest in Clwyd
- List of Sites of Special Scientific Interest in Flintshire
