= Connah's Quay Ponds and Woodland =

Protected area in Clwyd, Wales

Coordinates: 53.202952°N 3.0644075°W

Connah's Quay Ponds and Woodland is a Site of Special Scientific Interest in the preserved county of Clwyd, north Wales.

The Connahs Quay Woodland Project, run by Wales Council for Voluntary Action, does regular maintenance and conservation work in the woods with volunteers. They also run regular sessions with schools, to help children experience nature local nature.

== See also ==
- List of Sites of Special Scientific Interest in Clwyd
- List of Sites of Special Scientific Interest in Flintshire
