= Spinnies, Aberogwen =

Nature reserve in Gwynedd, Wales

Coordinates: 53.2275°N 4.0785°W

Spinnies Aberogwen
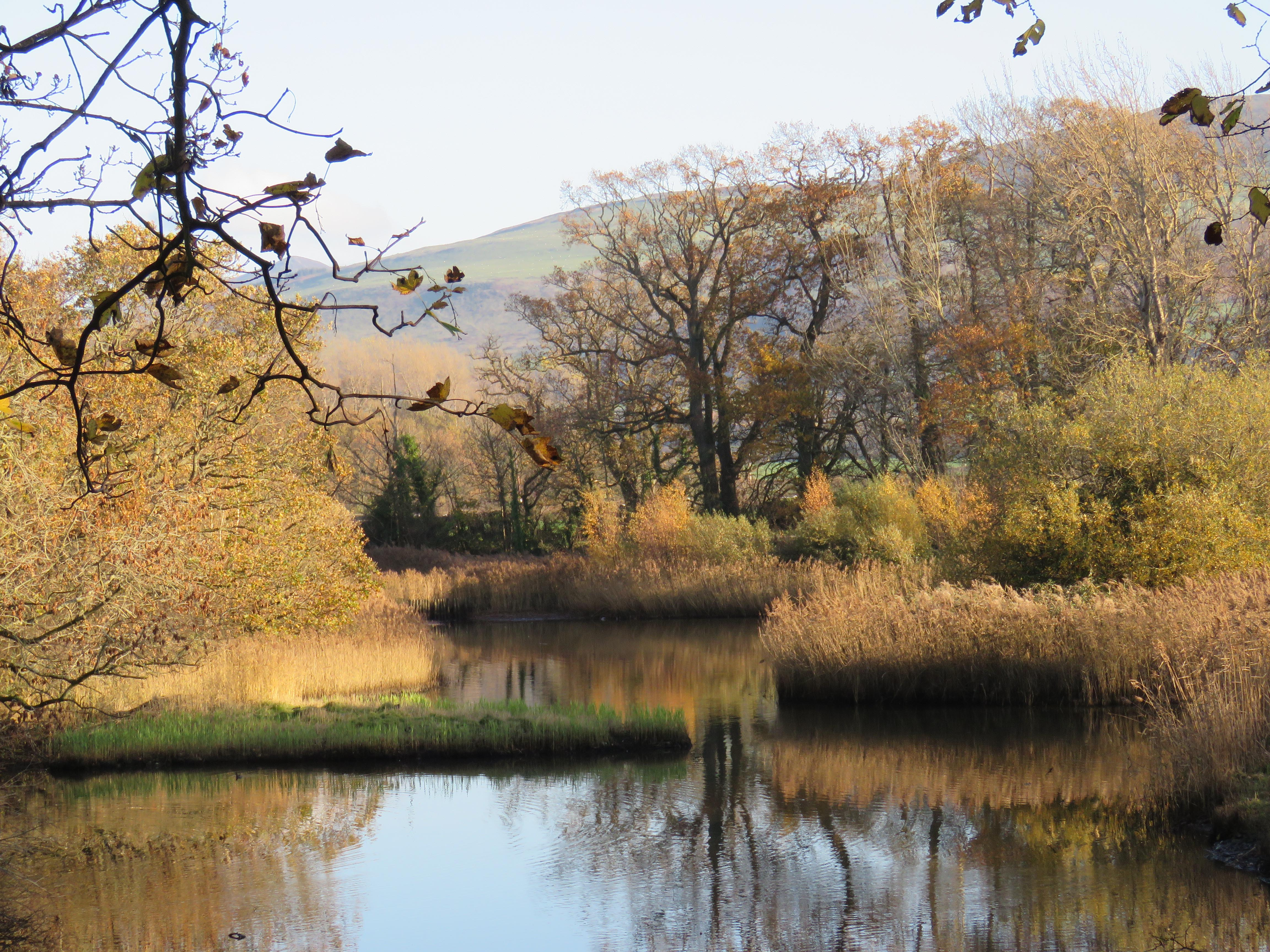
- View of the Spinnies Nature Reserve

- Location within Wales
- Location: near Bangor
- OS grid: SH613720
- Area: 3 hectares (7.4 acres)
- Operator: North Wales Wildlife Trust
- Website: Spinnies Aberogwen

Spinnies Aberogwen is a nature reserve located near Bangor, in Gwynedd, Wales. The reserve is managed by the North Wales Wildlife Trust. The reserve encompasses a unique mixture of saltwater and freshwater habitats where the River Ogwen meets Conwy Bay, creating an important ecological transition zone. It provides critical refuge for migratory birds and serves as an educational resource for local schools and universities. Traeth Lafan is adjacent and designated as a Site of Special Scientific Interest (SSSI), as an example of coastal mudflats.

== History and management ==
Although the wetland ponds at Spinnies Aberogwen are now valued for their wildlife, they were originally "borrow pits" dug by Victorian labourers when the River Ogwen was canalised in 1822. The reserve remains part of the Penrhyn Estate but has been managed by the North Wales Wildlife Trust since 1983. A simple sluice gate still regulates freshwater input from Snowdonia, controlling water levels and salinity to prevent flooding and maintain the lagoon ecosystem.

The reserve occupies a small coastal woodland centred on Aberogwen Lagoon in Gwynedd. The reserve comprises a series of shallow ponds fringed by mixed deciduous woodland, forming a mosaic of wetland habitats that are largely free from intensive management.

== Wildlife ==
Despite covering just 3 hectares (7.4 acres), Spinnies Aberogwen supports over 185 species of bird and a healthy mammal population (including stoats). Kingfishers are a signature resident, with grey herons also frequenting the ponds, and—on rare occasions—fish-eating ospreys passing through.

In a comparative survey of eight green spaces across Anglesey and Gwynedd, Spinnies Reserve ranked among the most biodiverse, with Shannon–Weiner diversity indices of H′ = 2.56 for native plant species and H′ = 2.50 for introduced species. Visitors to the site also rated its natural character very highly, giving an average "naturalness" score of 8.10 out of 10, reflecting its strong sense of wildness and minimal artificial influence.

== Access and visitor facilities ==
The reserve's free entry and proximity to junction 12 of the A55 make it one of North Wales Wildlife Trust's most accessible sites. It lies within easy walking distance of Bangor and Penrhyn Castle. Most paths and two bird-watching hides are wheelchair-accessible, and a large car park and bicycle racks are provided at the shoreline entrance.
