= Marford Quarry =

Protected quarry in Clwyd, Wales

Marford Quarry is a quarry and a Site of Special Scientific Interest in the preserved county of Clwyd, north Wales. It is managed by the North Wales Wildlife Trust.

== History and ecology ==
Marford Quarry was first opened in 1927 to extract sand and gravel deposits. These deposits were formed during the last Ice Age, when glacial meltwaters created a large delta terrace in the area. The material quarried was used in some major regional construction projects, including the Mersey Tunnel. Quarrying operations, managed by Tarmac Ltd, continued until 1971. When quarrying stopped, the site underwent replanting with more than 28,000 Corsican pine trees to stabilize the ground. The excavation destroyed the remains of Rofft Mount - a medieval motte-and-bailey castle once located on the site. In 1990, the North Wales Wildlife Trust acquired part of the quarry for conservation. It was later designated a Site of Special Scientific Interest (SSSI) for its rich invertebrate fauna. Surveys have recorded over 140 species of bees, wasps, and ants, including the first Welsh record of the solitary wasp Crossocerus distinguendus. Species of butterfly and moth present there include the dingy skipper and white-letter hairstreak: a small colony of the silver-studded blue, introduced from Prees Heath, Shropshire, in the 1970s, may now have died out.

== See also ==
- List of Sites of Special Scientific Interest in Clwyd
