= Llyn Bedydd =

Lake near Wrexham, Wales

Coordinates: 52°56′50″N 2°47′10″W

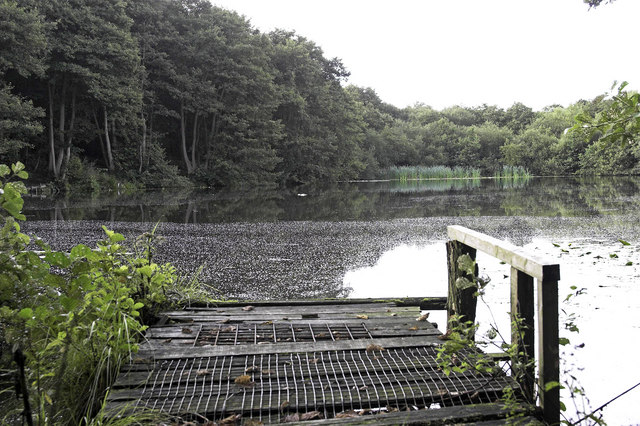
Llyn Bedydd

Llyn Bedydd is a small lake in Wrexham County Borough, in northeastern Wales, near the border with England. It is 7 kilometres (4.3 miles) south west of Whitchurch. The lake and the surrounding woodland are designated as a Site of Special Scientific Interest.

== Description ==
Llyn Bedydd means the "lake of Beda", the identity of Beda is however not known.

Llyn Bedydd is 1 hectare (2.5 acres) in area and is surrounded by carr woodland of willow and alder which merges into drier deciduous woodland dominated by downy birch and sycamore higher up the slope.

== Flora and fauna ==
The wet carr around the Llyn Bedydd is notable for purple small reed and alder buckthorn which are very rare in Clwyd; tufted sedge and bay willow which are uncommon in Clwyd; and the nationally scarce cowbane. The thin fringing strip of fen supports other interesting plants, especially sedges. The fen creates a tussocky species rich floating mat at the southern end of the lake while on the land in the southeastern corner of the SSSI there is a small area of fen pasture which grades into a bog. Llyn Bedydd is relatively shallow but it has steeply shelving banks which are shaded by the woodlands and these restrict the development of stands of emergent and marginal vegetation.

Llyn Bedydd is supports a rich invertebrate fauna, species recorded include the nationally scarce variable damselfly and the local red-eyed damselfly. Llyn Bedydd contains common bream, common rudd, common carp, European perch, tench and common roach. The fishing is run by Warners Fishing Club.

== Archaeology ==
In 1877 a logboat was found in the Llyn Bedydd.

== See also ==
- List of Sites of Special Scientific Interest in Clwyd
