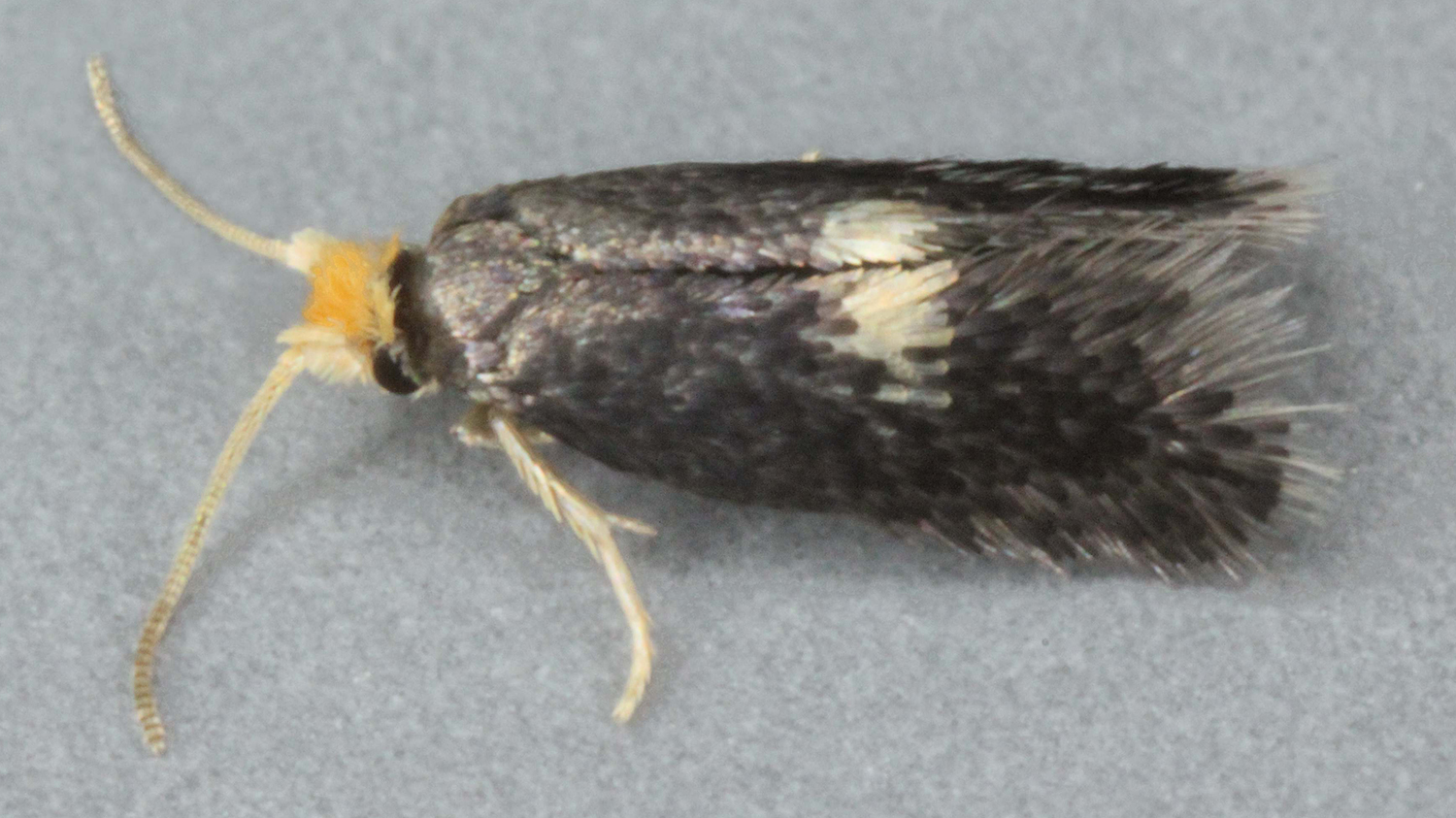

Scientific classification
- Kingdom: Animalia
- Phylum: Arthropoda
- Class: Insecta
- Order: Lepidoptera
- Family: Nepticulidae
- Genus: Ectoedemia
- Species: E. intimella

Binomial name
- Ectoedemia intimella (Zeller, 1848)

Synonyms
- Nepticula intimella Zeller, 1848; Dechtiria intimella; Stigmella intimella

= Ectoedemia intimella =

Species of moth

Ectoedemia intimella is a moth of the family Nepticulidae which is found in Europe. It flies in June and July and the larva mine the leaves of willows (Salix species) from July to November.

== Description ==
The wingspan is 5.3 to 6.8 mm. The head is ferruginous to orange, the collar whitish. Antennae are wholly ochreous-whitish. The forewings are blackish or dark fuscous, faintly purplish-tinged; an ochreous whitish dorsal spot hardly beyond middle; tips of apical cilia white. Hindwings grey.

Adults are on wing in June and July and there is one generation per year.

== Life cycle ==
=== Egg ===
Eggs are laid in June and July on the upperside of the midrib of a willow leaf. It is hard to find, but it is usually approximately 10 mm nearer the petiole then where the larva enters the midrib to start the mine.

=== Larva ===
The larva is pale yellow with a green gut and its head is pale brown. At first they mine the midrib and then make a blotch in the leaf. It makes a double line of frass with a passage between the lines of frass leading back to the midrib. When not feeding the larva hides in the midrib and when too large for the midrib it rests between the line of frass. Eventually the larva remains at the feeding edge of the mine and the frass is deposited haphazardly, blocking the passage to the midrib. Occasionally a larva mines the petiole and rarely a lateral rib. If a leaf falls the larva can be found in a green island and waterlogging does not seem to affect the larva.

=== Pupa ===
The pupa can be found from November to June, in a pale ochreous to light reddish brown cocoon, on the ground or in leaf litter.

== Ecology ==
The moth is univoltine (i.e. one generation per year) and can be disturbed from the foliage of the larval food plant.

=== Host plants ===
It feeds on eared willow (Salix aurita), Babylon willow (Salix babylonica), goat willow (Salix caprea), grey willow (Salix cinerea), Salix dasyclados, crack willow (Salix fragilis), bay willow (Salix pentandra), tea-leaved willow (Salix phylicifolia) and common osier (Salix viminalis).

== Distribution ==
Widely distributed in northern, western and central Europe, but not yet recorded from Norway. In the south it is only known from northern Italy, northern former Yugoslavia and Romania.
