= Ysgol yr Hendre =

Welsh/Spanish primary school in Trelew, Chubut, Argentina

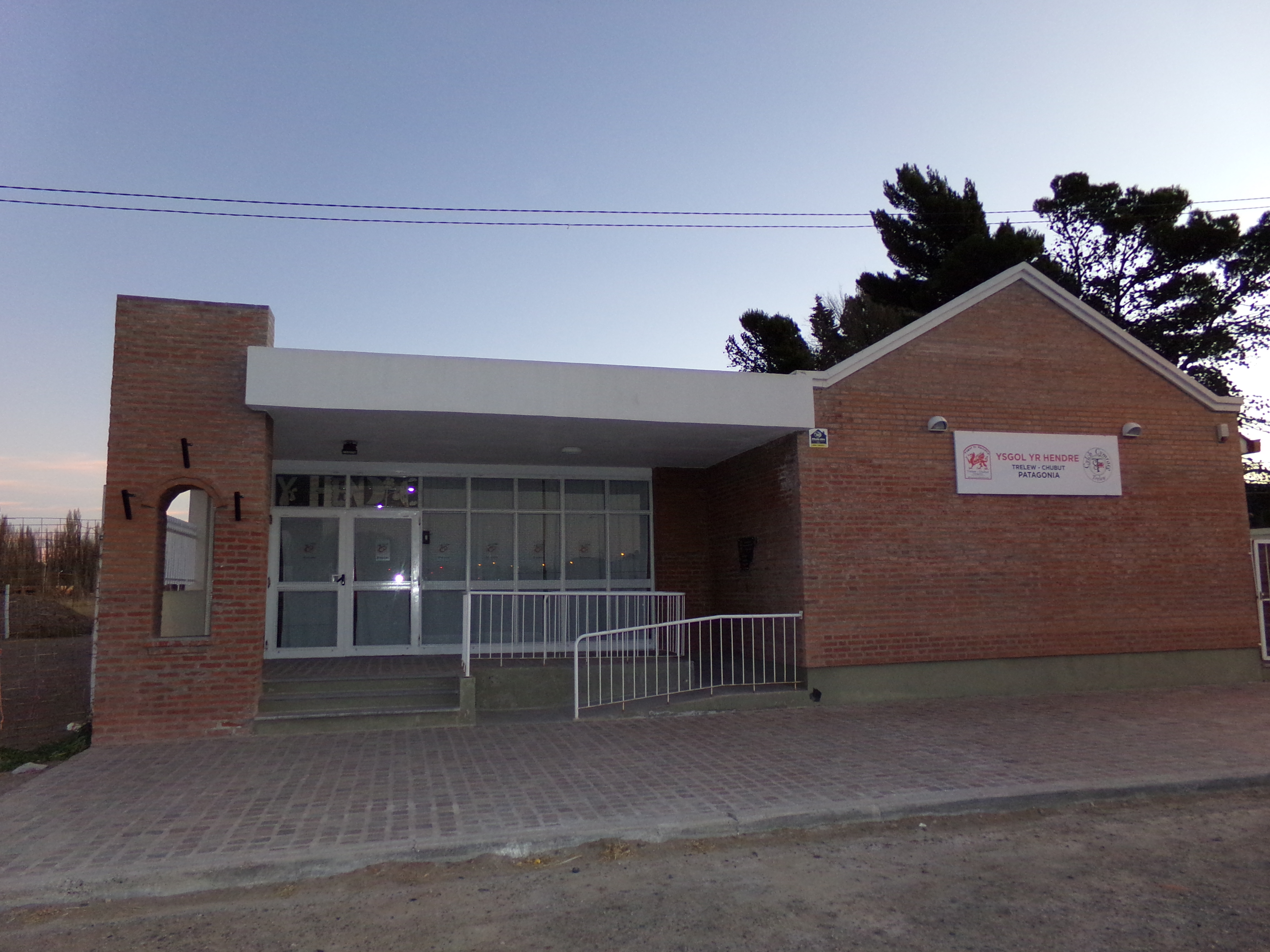
Ysgol yr Hendre, Chubut, Argentina

Ysgol yr Hendre (Welsh pronunciation: [ˈəskɔl ər ˈhɛndrɛ]) is a Welsh/Spanish-medium primary school in the large town of Trelew in Chubut Province, Argentina. It was founded by Monica Graciela Jones in March 1996 under the name 'Ysgol Feithrin Y Ddraig Fach' and classes were conducted in the out-building of her property. It was officially inaugurated by the effort of Catrin Morris on 6 March 2006, initially to teach children between three and five years of age in Spanish and Welsh in order to grow the school to become bilingual. The Chubut education authorities authorised the establishment of the school and supports its aims. The school is twinned with Ysgol Pentreuchaf near Pwllheli in Wales.

Its name literally means ‘School of the Old Homestead/Dwelling’, where hendre (‘old residence’) is another way to say hendref.

The development of the school was financed in part by a fundraising campaign in Wales led by the politician Dafydd Wigley and the artist Sir Kyffin Williams, which raised over US$60,000 in less than two years.

The school was part of a 21st-century revival in Welsh in "the Welsh colony" Y Wladfa on the Chubut River (Afon Camwy in Welsh). It is one of several active Welsh schools and nurseries. In 2005 there were 62 Welsh classes in Chubut, and Welsh was on the curriculum of two primary schools and two colleges in the Gaiman catchment area. In 2018 there were three bilingual Welsh-Spanish schools in Chubut Province.
