= Halkyn Common and Holywell Grasslands =

Protected area in Clwyd, Wales

Coordinates: 53.23°N 3.21°W

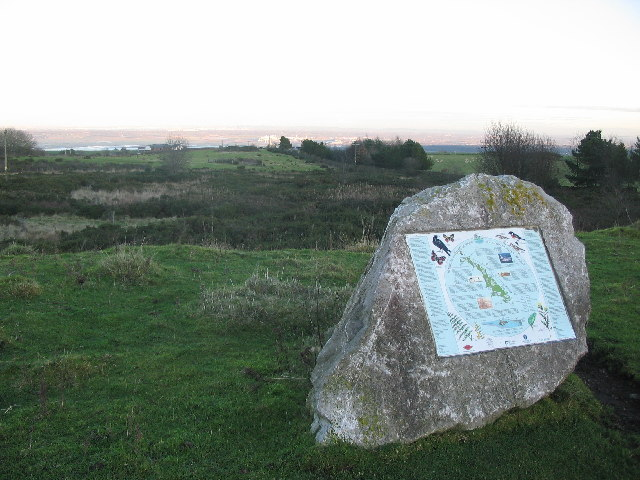
Looking eastward across the common.

Halkyn Common and Holywell Grasslands (Welsh: Comin Helygain a Glaswelltiroedd Treffynnon) is a Site of Special Scientific Interest in Flintshire, north Wales covering Halkyn Mountain and surrounding areas. It lies 4 km north-west of Mold on a plateau about 100–300 m above sea-level. It includes 699.3 hectares of grassland, heathland and other open vegetation with numerous spoil tips and quarries. The site is notable for populations of plants such as spring sandwort and stemless thistle and amphibians such as the great crested newt.

== See also ==
- List of Sites of Special Scientific Interest in Flintshire
