= Moel Hiraddug Quarries =

Protected quarries in Clwyd, Wales

Moel Hiraddug Quarries is a quarry and a Site of Special Scientific Interest in the preserved county of Clwyd, north Wales.

== See also ==
- List of Sites of Special Scientific Interest in Clwyd
