= Denbigh Town Hall =

Municipal Building in Denbigh, Wales

- Neuadd y Dref Denbigh (Welsh)
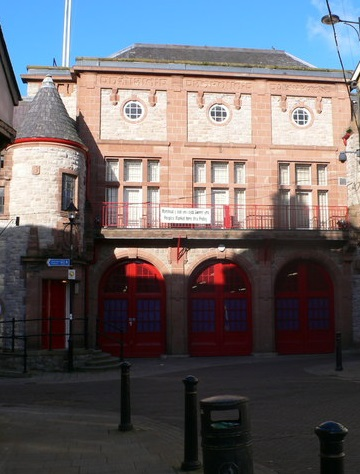
- Denbigh Town Hall

- Shown in Denbighshire
- 53.1841°N 3.4197°W
- Location: Crown Lane, Denbigh

History
- Built: 1917

Site notes
- Architect: Charles Ernest Elcock
- Architectural style: Arts and Crafts style

Listed Building – Grade II*
- Official name: Town Hall
- Designated: 20 July 2000
- Reference no.: 23591

Denbigh Town Hall (Welsh: Neuadd y Dref Denbigh), is a municipal building in Crown Lane, Denbigh, Denbighshire, Wales. The structure, which is the meeting place of Denbigh Town Council, is a Grade II* listed building.

== History ==
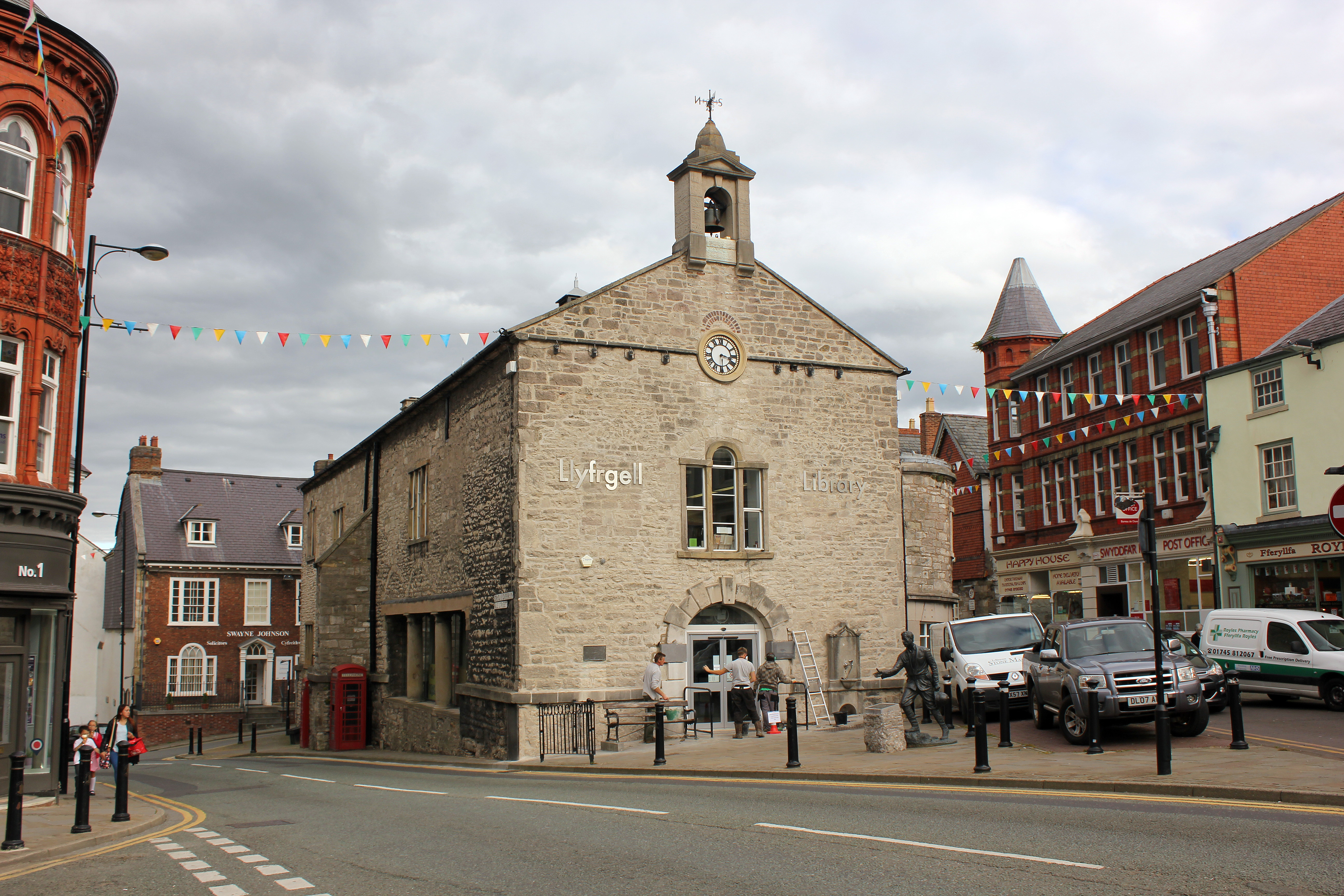
The old town hall, later referred to as the county hall and now used as a library

The first municipal building in the town was the old town hall, later referred to as the county hall, in Vale Street which was commissioned by Robert Dudley, 1st Earl of Leicester and completed in 1572. In addition to being the venue for the magistrates' court hearings, it had been the regular meeting place of the borough council.

In the early 20th century, civic leaders decided to commission a more substantial building: the site selected was occupied by a market hall designed by Thomas Fulljames and completed in 1848. The foundation stone for the new building was laid by the mayor, Thomas Lloyd Jones, on 25 March 1915. It was designed by Charles Ernest Elcock in the Arts and Crafts style, built by Morton Brown of Chester in roughcast brick with a reinforced concrete frame and was completed in September 1917.

The design involved an asymmetrical main frontage with seven bays facing onto Crown Lane. The central section of three bays, which was slightly recessed, featured three openings with voussoirs and keystones flanked by pilasters supporting a wrought iron balcony; there were three mullioned and transomed windows on the first floor and three sandstone panels containing oculi on the second floor. The second and third floor windows were flanked by pilasters supporting an entablature inscribed with the words "Denbigh Borough Markets", with a parapet above. The second bay on the left took the form of a curved stairwell tower with a doorway on the ground floor, a single window on the first floor and a conical roof above. The second bay on the right also took the form of a stairwell tower but with a doorway on the ground floor, lancet windows on the first and second floors and a stepped gable above. There was originally a large dome on the roof. Internally, the principal rooms were the new market hall on the ground floor and the council chamber on the first floor.

A cinema was established in the building so that silent films could be shown in March 1919. A war memorial, designed by Charles Leonard Hartwell in the form of a winged figure of peace, which was intended to commemorate the lives of local service personnel who had died in the First World War, was erected and unveiled in front of the building in 1923. After a purpose-built cinema was established in the town, film shows ceased in the 1940s and the dome was removed from the roof for reasons of safety in the 1950s. Visiting speakers included the suffragette, Leonora Cohen, who retired to Colwyn Bay and gave a talk in the town hall in Denbigh in 1970.

The building continued to serve as the meeting place of the borough council for much of the 20th century but ceased to be the local seat of government when the enlarged Glyndŵr District Council was formed in 1974. Instead, the building became the meeting place of Denbigh Town Council. Works of art in the town hall include a portrait of King James I by an unknown artist.

== See also ==
- Grade II* listed buildings in Denbighshire
