= Chwarel Singret =

Protected area in Clwyd, Wales

- Site of Special Scientific Interest
- Location within Wales
- Location of Chwarel Singret.
- Area of search: Clwyd
- Grid reference: SJ3448556182
- Coordinates: 53.098799°N 2.9798999°W
- Interest: Geology
- Area: 0.5 ha (1.2 acres)
- Notification date: 4 December 2002

Chwarel Singret is a Site of Special Scientific Interest in the preserved county of Clwyd, north Wales.

== See also ==
- List of Sites of Special Scientific Interest in Clwyd
