= Old Pulford Brook Meadows =

Protected area in Clwyd, Wales

Old Pulford Brook Meadows is a Site of Special Scientific Interest in the preserved county of Clwyd, north Wales.

== See also ==
- List of Sites of Special Scientific Interest in Clwyd
