= Cloy Brook Pastures =

Protected area in Clwyd, Wales

Caeau Cloy Brook
- Site of Special Scientific Interest
- Location within Wales
- Location of Caeau Cloy Brook.
- Area of search: Clwyd
- Grid reference: SJ3929942251
- Coordinates: 52.974158°N 2.9053869°W
- Interest: Biological
- Area: 5.73 ha (14.2 acres)
- Notification date: 18 January 1985

Cloy Brook Pastures is a Site of Special Scientific Interest in the preserved county of Clwyd, north Wales.

It is an area of wet pasture managed by grazing, with a variety of plants such as dyer’s greenweed, pepper saxifrage and spiny restharrow.

== See also ==
- List of Sites of Special Scientific Interest in Clwyd
