= Llyn Ty'n y Llyn =

Protected area in Clwyd, Wales

Coordinates: 53.2183°N 3.7300°W

Llyn Ty'n y Llyn is a Site of Special Scientific Interest in the preserved county of Clwyd, north Wales.

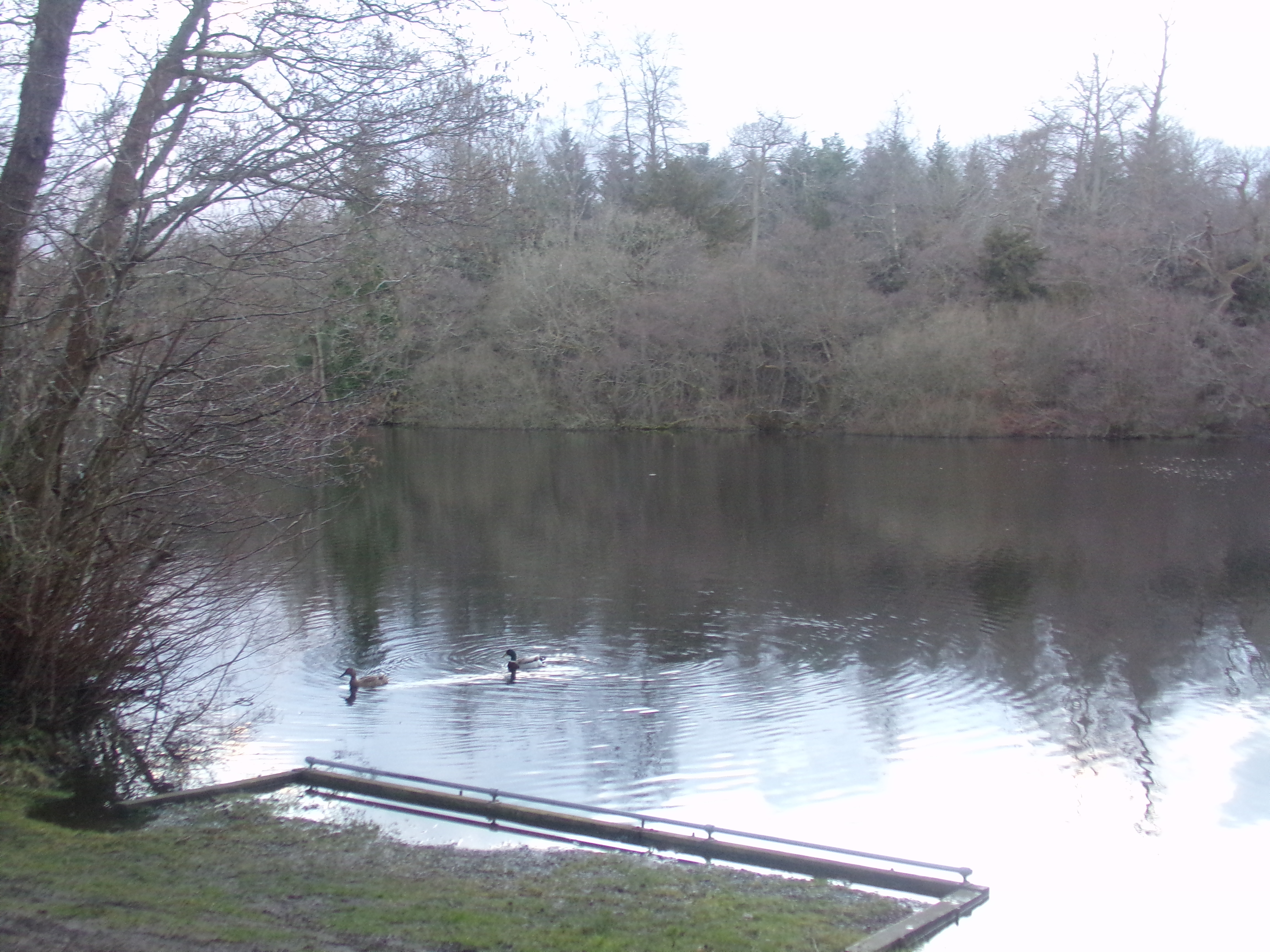
Llyn Ty'n y Llyn

== See also ==
- List of Sites of Special Scientific Interest in Clwyd
