= Ddol Uchaf =

Protected area in Clwyd, Wales

- Y Ddol Uchaf
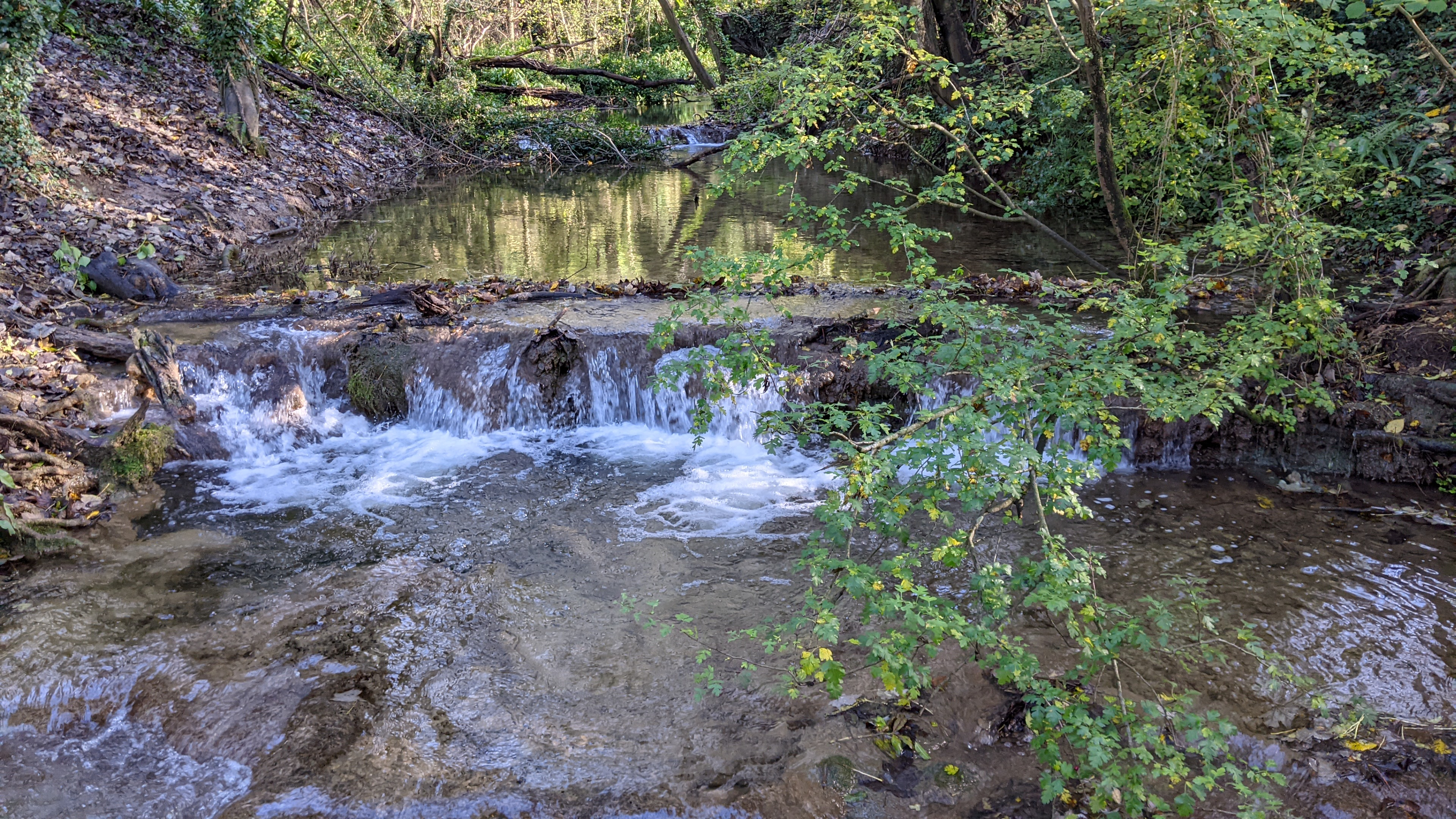

- Location within Wales
- Interactive map of Ddol Uchaf
- Type: Nature Reserve
- Coordinates: 53.232°N 3.288°W
- Area: 4 hectares (9.9 acres)
- Created: 1965
- Operator: North Wales Wildlife Trust
- Website: www.northwaleswildlifetrust.org.uk/nature-reserves/ddol-uchaf

Ddol Uchaf (also known as Y Ddol Uchaf) is a Site of Special Scientific Interest located near Ysceifiog, Flintshire, Wales. It has been selected as an SSSI due to the unique wildlife and organisms around the area.

== Wildlife ==
Ddol Uchaf was designated as an SSSI because of its wildlife, grassland and soils. In particular, it is notable for hosting three species of newt (great crested newt, palmate newt and smooth newt) and being one of very few sites with a population of hazel dormice. Many plants including common spotted orchid are found on the site. Several insect species have been recorded, including 12 species of dragonfly. There have been 93 recorded species of birds in the area, including carrion crow, lesser whitethroat, and sedge warbler. The site is also known for its tufa limestone, which supports many of the animals living in the site and has formed many ponds.

The site is one of only two sites in the UK where the fungus gnat Boletina nasuta has been recorded .

== History ==
Ddol Uchaf means "Upper Meadow". The site was mentioned in 1647 as Ddol y Person. In 1657 it was referred to as Ddol Uchaf.

The site was quarried for tufa and marl during the Second World War. After the war, the site was abandoned until 1965 when it was purchased by the North Wales Naturalist Trust as a nature reserve.
