= Maes y Grug =

Protected area in Clwyd, Wales

- Site of Special Scientific Interest
- Location within Wales
- Location of Maes y Grug.
- Area of search: Clwyd
- Grid reference: SJ2623166391
- Coordinates: 53.189471°N 3.1055015°W
- Interest: Biological
- Area: 17.29 ha (42.7 acres)
- Notification date: 10 December 1997

Maes y Grug is a Site of Special Scientific Interest at Alltami in the preserved county of Clwyd, north Wales.

The site was a former colliery and consists of a large pond surrounded by deciduous woodland along with smaller ponds, marshland and grassland surrounded by farmland used for grazing. The site has SSSI status due mainly to the presence of the Great Crested Newt and is a Special area of Conservation (SAC). Access to the site is by footpath from the car park.

North East Wales Wildlife and Flintshire County Council own the site.

== See also ==
- List of Sites of Special Scientific Interest in Clwyd
