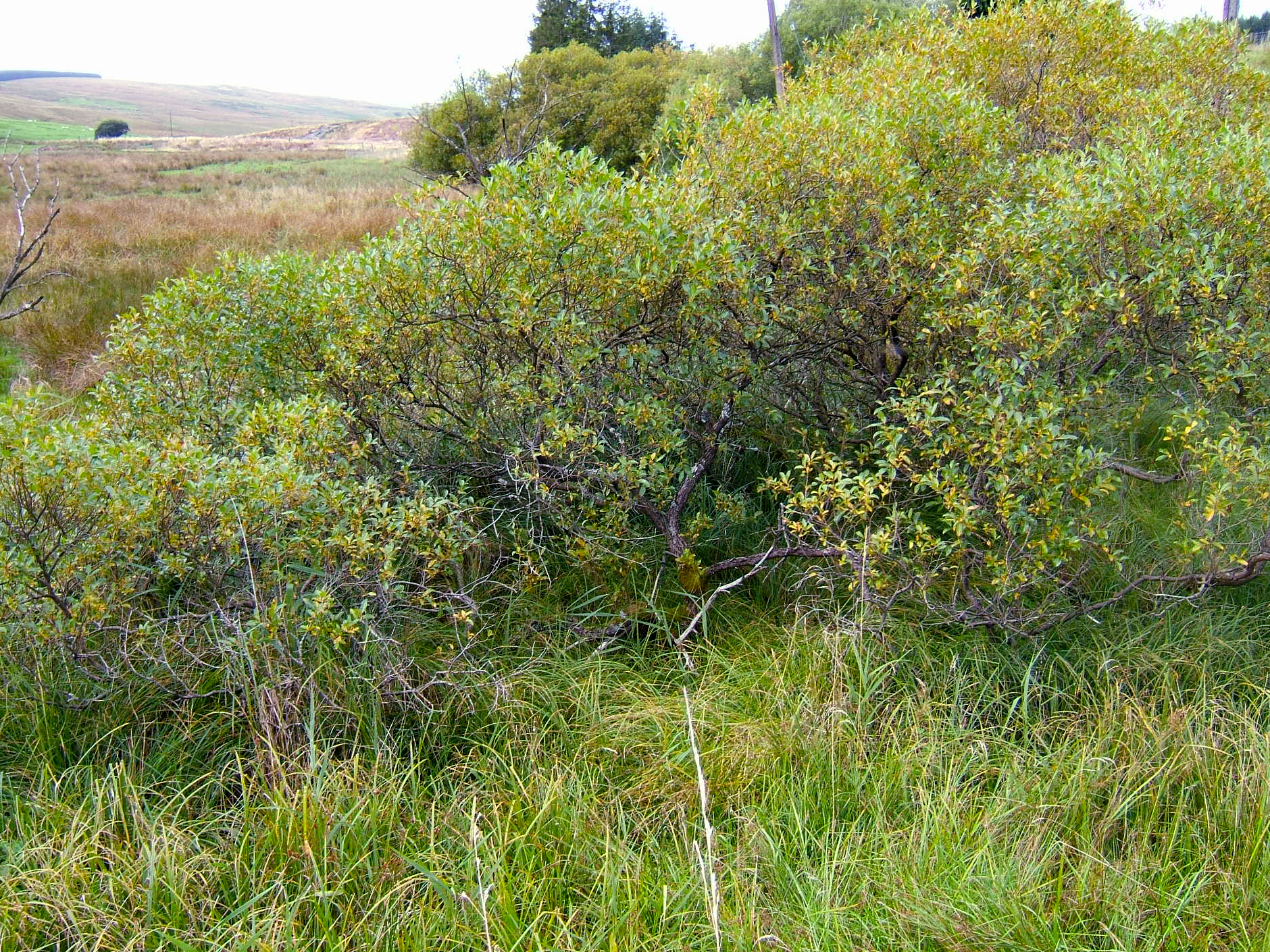
- Bay willow with early autumn colours, Kielder, Northumberland

Conservation status
- Least Concern (IUCN 3.1)

Scientific classification
- Kingdom: Plantae
- Clade: Tracheophytes
- Clade: Angiosperms
- Clade: Eudicots
- Clade: Rosids
- Order: Malpighiales
- Family: Salicaceae
- Genus: Salix
- Species: S. pentandra

Binomial name
- Salix pentandra L.

= Salix pentandra =

Species of flowering plant

Salix pentandra, the bay willow, is a species of willow native to northern Europe and northern Asia. The scientific name refers to the male flowers having five stamens. The English name derives from the resemblance of the leaves to those of the bay laurel; other common names include bay-leaved willow and laurel willow. Its glossy leaves make it more decorative than many other willows, so it is often planted as an ornamental tree.

== Description ==
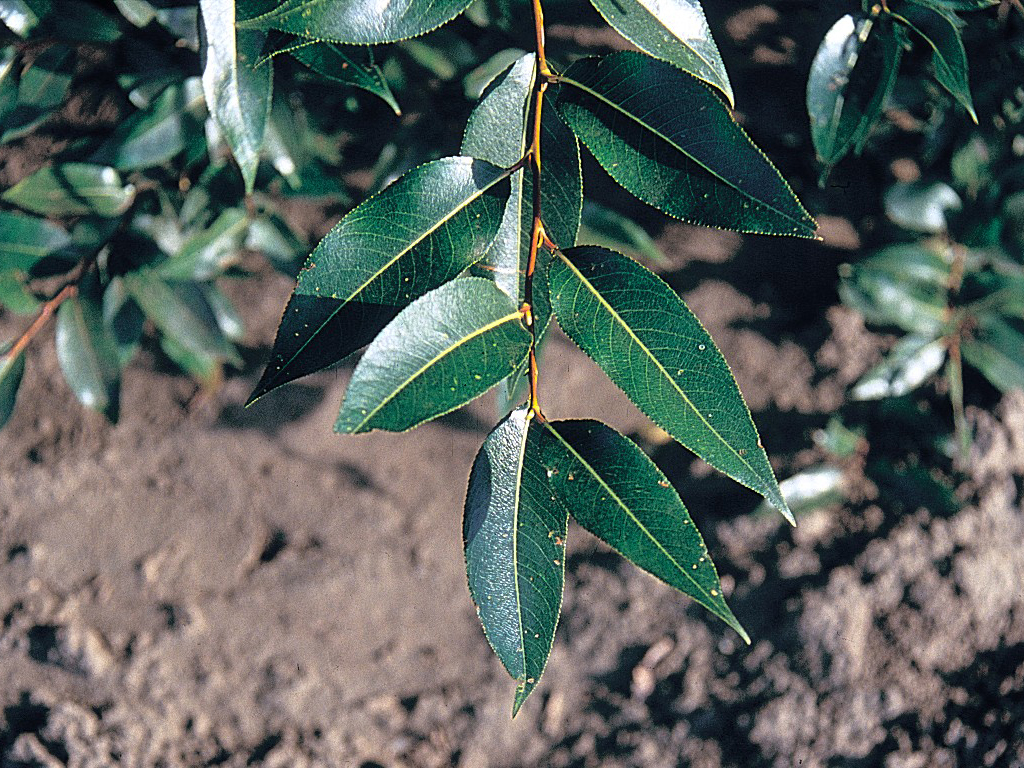
Leaves

The bay willow is a large shrub or small tree growing to 14 m (46 ft) tall (rarely to 17 metres, 56 ft), usually growing in wet, boggy ground. The leaves are glossy dark green, 5–12 cm (2.0–4.7 in) long and 2–5 cm (0.79–1.97 in) broad, with finely serrated margins. The dioecious flowers are catkins, produced in late spring after the leaves; the male catkins are yellow, 2–5 cm long, the female catkins greenish, 1.5–3 cm (0.59–1.18 in) long; they are pollinated by bees. The fruit is a small capsule containing numerous minute seeds embedded in white down which aids wind dispersal.

== Distribution and habitat ==
The bay willow occurs naturally in northern Europe and northern Asia. In the British Isles it is most common in Scotland and northern England and is sometimes planted as an ornamental tree elsewhere. It grows beside rivers and streams, on marshy ground and in wet woodland. It occurs beside Llyn Bedydd in Wrexham County Borough, Wales, an uncommon plant in the area. It has become locally naturalised in northern North America, and is known as laurel willow there.

== Ecology ==
The foliage is the food plant for the larvae of several species of moth, including Ectoedemia intimella whose larvae mine the leaves. The catkins are attractive to bees and other insects for the nectar and pollen they produce early in the year. This willow is susceptible to watermark disease, which causes branches to die back, and is caused by the pathogenic bacterium Brenneria salicis.
