= Coed Talon Marsh =

Protected area in Clwyd, Wales

Coed Talon Marsh is a Site of Special Scientific Interest in the preserved county of Clwyd, north Wales.

== See also ==
- List of Sites of Special Scientific Interest in Clwyd
