= Caerwys Tufa =

Protected area in Clwyd, Wales

- Site of Special Scientific Interest
- Location within Wales
- Location of Caerwys Tufa.
- Area of search: Clwyd
- Grid reference: SJ1288071893
- Coordinates: 53.236894°N 3.3067675°W
- Interest: Geology
- Area: 8.32 ha (20.6 acres)
- Notification date: 1 January 1963

Caerwys Tufa is a Site of Special Scientific Interest in the preserved county of Clwyd, north Wales.

Tufa, a very soft limestone that was once used to make cement, and later, widely used in alpine gardens, was extracted at Caerwys Tufa Quarry.

== See also ==
- List of Sites of Special Scientific Interest in Clwyd
