= Cil-y-groeslwyd Woods, Eyarth Woods & Rocks & Craig Adwy-wynt =

Protected area in Clwyd, Wales

Cil-y-groeslwyd Woods, Eyarth Woods & Rocks & Craig Adwy-wynt is a Site of Special Scientific Interest in the preserved county of Clwyd, Wales.

== See also ==
- List of Sites of Special Scientific Interest in Clwyd
