= Penarth Quarry =

Slate quarry in Denbighshire, Wales

Coordinates: 52°58′17″N 3°19′47″W

Penarth Quarry is a quarry and a Site of Special Scientific Interest in the preserved county of Clwyd, north Wales.

== See also ==
- List of Sites of Special Scientific Interest in Clwyd
