= Gwaith Powdwr =

Nature reserve in Wales

Coordinates: 52.9320°N 4.0544°W

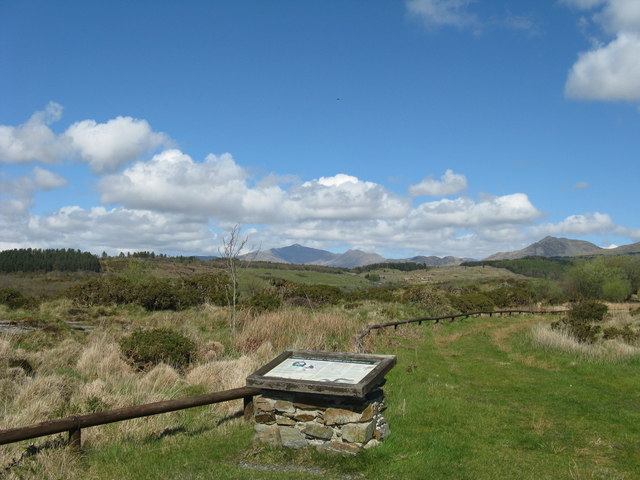
Marker point at Gwaith Powdwr

Gwaith Powdwr, (English: Powder Works), situated in Penrhyndeudraeth, Wales, is a decommissioned explosives works now managed as a Nature Reserve by the North Wales Wildlife Trust.

The explosives factory was initially opened in 1865 and changed hands several times before being bought by Ralph Cooke in 1922. He renamed the site Cooke's Explosives and the factory became a noted explosives production plant. During the Second World War, it produced more than 17 million grenades. Cooke retired in 1955 and the site was taken over by a partner company, Imperial Chemical Industries, until its closure in 1995. Several accidents occurred at the site, including explosions in 1957 and 1988 which killed six workers in total.

== Explosives factory ==
The site was opened as the Patent Safety Guncotton Company in 1865 an explosives making factory to provide charges for mining quarries. The factory was officially licensed in 1875 and became part of the New Explosives Company. In the early 20th century, the site changed hands again, becoming known as Steelite Explosives Company Ltd. In June 1915, an explosion at the site was felt at the nearby village of Penrhyndeudraeth, where windows were smashed by the shockwave. The local residents, fearing the explosion was a German attack, fled to nearby Porthmadog until the cause was ascertained.

The works were acquired by Ralph Cooke, a coal mining businessman who owned a similar site in Essex, in 1922 and became known as Cooke's Explosives. Two years after purchasing the factory, Cooke closed his Essex site and expanded at his new factory. An explosion at the site in 1928 prompted Cooke to sell part of the company to a rival firm, Imperial Chemical Industries (ICI), in exchange for expertise. During the Second World War, the factory was commissioned to make grenades for the armed forces and produced more than 17 million.

Cooke retired in 1955 and ICI acquired the remaining shares in the company. In 1957, four workers were killed in an explosion that was blamed one mice chewing through cables. Another explosion in June 1988 resulted in two workers being killed and eight more injured. An inquiry found that the workers had been outside the reinforced control bunker while mixing was in operation. The company was subsequently fined £100,000 and charged £30,000 for expenses for health and safety failures. The factory was closed in 1995 as demand for mining explosives fell. At the height of its production around 500 people were employed at the factory.

== Nature reserve ==
The land was donated to the North Wales Wildlife Trust in 1998. The area was converted into a nature reserve, covering an area of around 24 hectares. The nature reserve is designated as both a Special Area of Conservation (SAC) and a Site of Special Scientific Interest (SSSI). The area required detoxifying following its use as an explosives factory before being replanted.
