= Maes Hiraddug =

Protected area in Clwyd, Wales

- Site of Special Scientific Interest
- Location within Wales
- Location of Maes Hiraddug.
- Area of search: Clwyd
- Grid reference: SJ0634579397
- Coordinates: 53.303211°N 3.4068622°W
- Interest: Biological
- Area: 4.37 ha (10.8 acres)
- Notification date: 11 November 1999

Maes Hiraddug is a Site of Special Scientific Interest in the preserved county of Clwyd, north Wales.

It is species-rich neutral grassland which includes notable species including spiny restharrow and the greater butterfly orchid. The reserve is managed by the North Wales Wildlife Trust. It is an example of wildflower meadow which pre-dates modern agricultural land management.

== See also ==
- List of Sites of Special Scientific Interest in Clwyd
