= Big Pool Wood =

Nature reserve in Clwyd, Wales

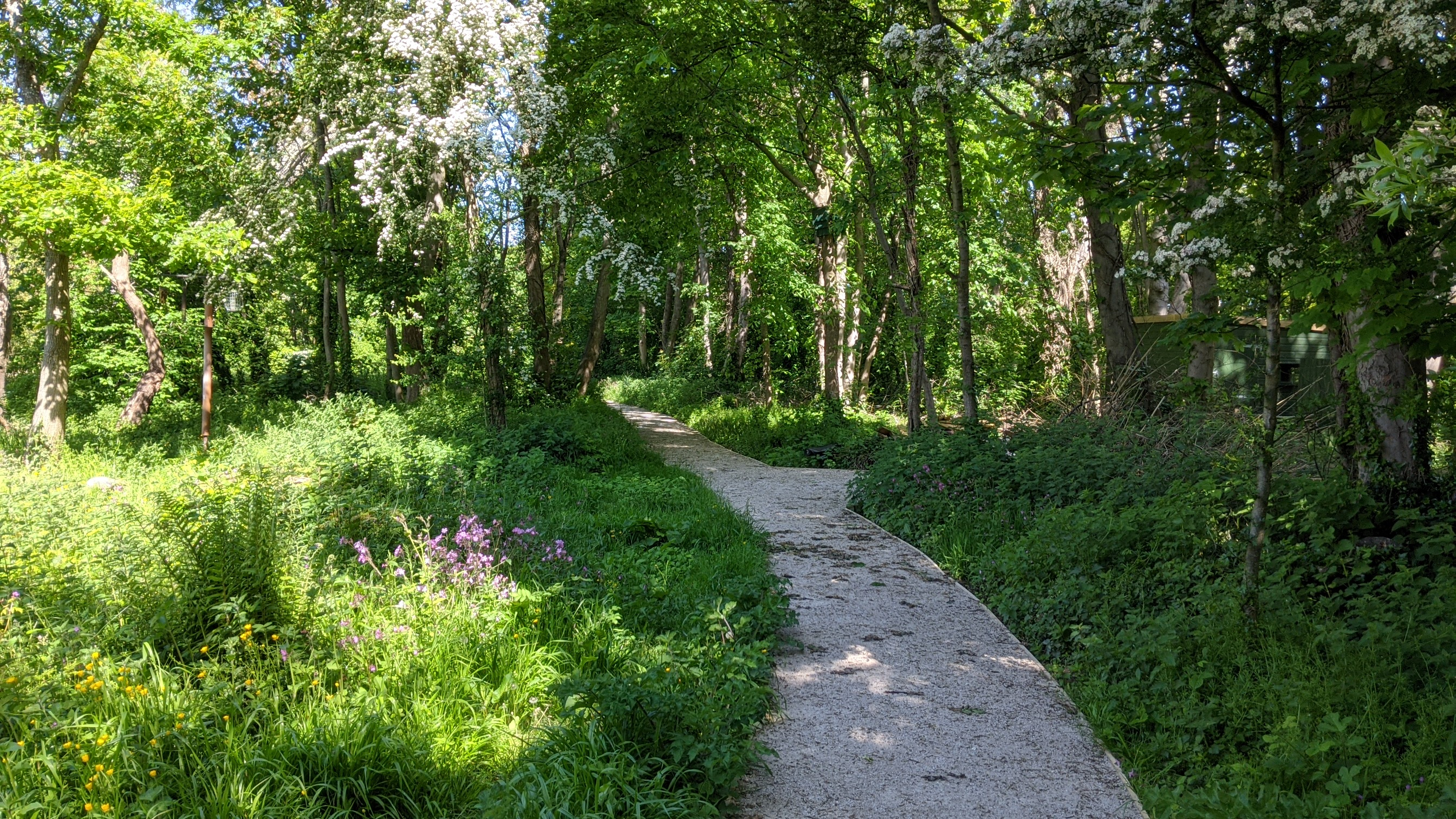

- Location within Wales
- Type: Nature Reserve
- Coordinates: 53.345°N 3.350°W
- Area: 4 hectares (9.9 acres)
- Operator: North Wales Wildlife Trust
- Website: www.northwaleswildlifetrust.org.uk/nature-reserves/big-pool-wood

Big Pool Wood is a Nature reserve located near Gronant, Flintshire, Wales. The site is part of the Dee Estuary SSSI & SAC due to the unique wildlife and organisms found in the area. The reserve is centered around a pond which paths and boardwalks encircling it. There are a number of bird hides located around the reserve.

The site is part of the Designated Special Area of Conservation – a protected region that supports waterfowl and waders in the winter. Big Pool Wood both provides shelter and cover for some of these wetland birds and forms part of a wildlife corridor that stretches along the North Wales coast all the way to Anglesey; particularly important for migratory birds.
