= Buckley Claypits and Commons =

Protected area in Clwyd, Wales

- Site of Special Scientific Interest
- Location within Wales
- Location of Buckley Claypits and Commons.
- Area of search: Clwyd
- Grid reference: SJ2802065529
- Coordinates: 53.18197°N 3.0785377°W
- Interest: Biological
- Area: 99.76 ha (246.5 acres)
- Notification date: 15 January 2002

Buckley Claypits and Commons is a Site of Special Scientific Interest in the preserved county of Clwyd, north Wales. It is an important reserve for the great crested newt.

== See also ==
- List of Sites of Special Scientific Interest in Clwyd
