= Coedydd Aber National Nature Reserve =

National nature reserve in Gwynned, Wales

Coordinates: 53.231°N 4.025°W

Coedydd Aber National Nature Reserve lies tucked away in a steep valley on the northern flanks of the Carneddau mountains, roughly midway between Bangor and Llanfairfechan in Gwynedd, Wales.

Water cascades over a hard shelf of volcanic rock at the far end of the Aber valley, before plummeting 100m down the Aber Falls to flow swiftly along a torrential river channel to the sea.

The nearby village of Abergwyngregyn was an important centre for the Welsh princes in the 13th century, and the valley contains some remains from this period.
