= Denbigh =

Town in Denbighshire, Wales

Denbigh: Welsh: Dinbych
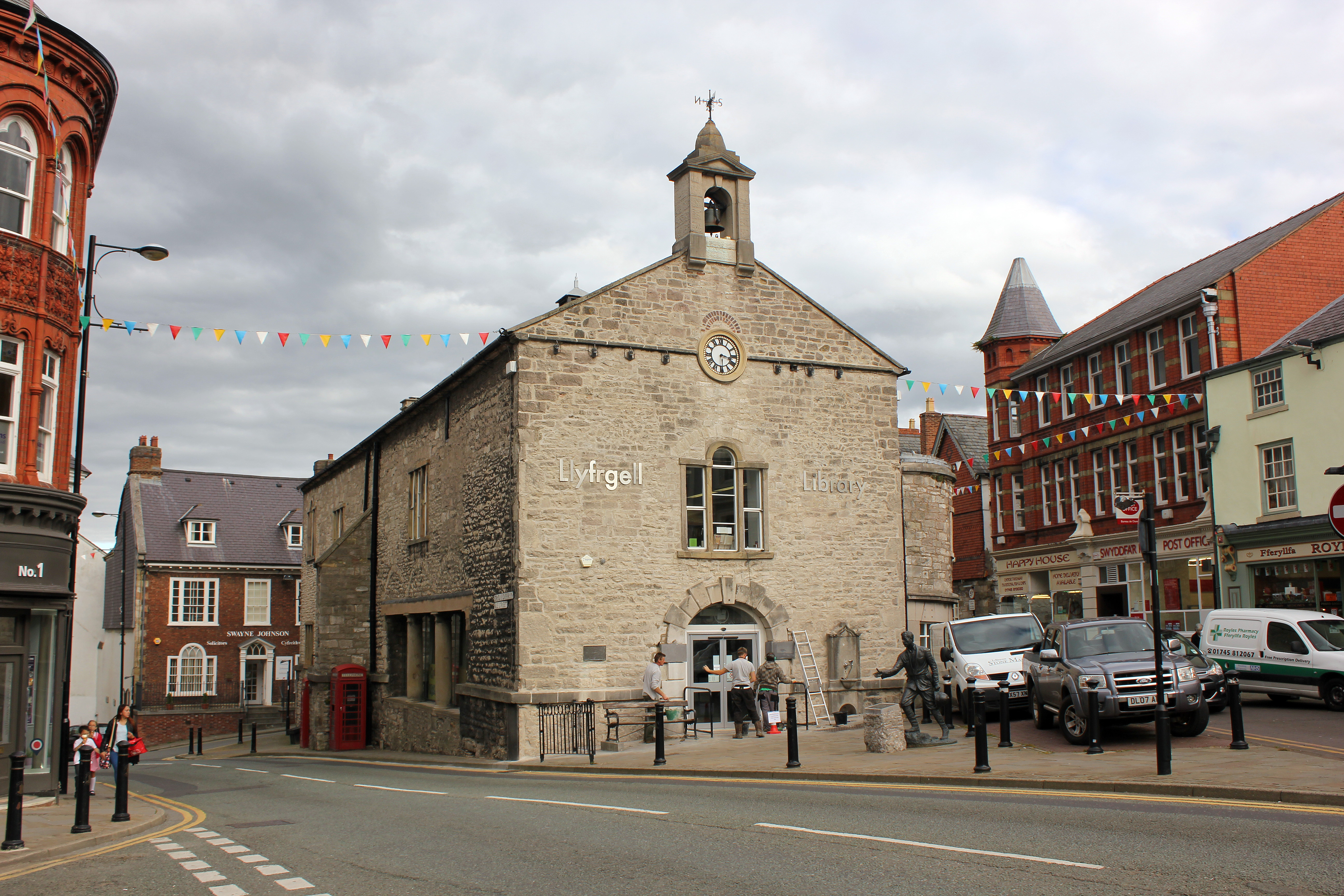
- Denbigh Library, formerly County Hall

- Location within Denbighshire
- Population: 8,669 (Community, 2021); 8,075 (Built up area, 2021)
- OS grid reference: SJ053663
- Community: Denbigh
- Principal area: Denbighshire
- Preserved county: Clwyd
- Country: Wales
- Sovereign state: United Kingdom
- Post town: DENBIGH
- Postcode district: LL16
- Dialling code: 01745
- Police: North Wales
- Fire: North Wales
- Ambulance: Welsh
- UK Parliament: Clwyd North
- Senedd Cymru – Welsh Parliament: Vale of Clwyd
- Website: denbightowncouncil.gov.uk
- List of places UK Wales Denbighshire 53.1854°N 3.4178°W Map of the community

Denbigh (/ˈdɛnbi/ DEN-bee; Welsh: Dinbych [ˈdɪnbɨχ]) is a market town and a community in Denbighshire, Wales. It was the original county town of the historic county of Denbighshire created in 1536. Denbigh's Welsh name (Dinbych) translates to "Little Fortress"; a reference to its historic castle. Denbigh lies near the Clwydian Hills.

The town developed around Denbigh Castle, built in 1282, and the walled settlement that followed under Edward I. Over the centuries, it became known as a stronghold, a busy market town, and an administrative hub. Although Denbigh has seen times of conflict and decline, its medieval walls, castle ruins, and historic centre still shape its character today. According to the 2021 census, the town has a population of about 8,669.

== History ==
Denbigh anciently formed part of the cantref of Rhufoniog. For much of its history, Rhufoniog was subordinate to the Kingdom of Gwynedd, but it also spent periods under English control during the 12th and 13th centuries. By the 13th century, Denbigh was the main town of Rhufoniog. In 1284, following the Conquest of Wales by Edward I, Rhufoniog was made part of a new marcher lordship called Denbigh or Denbighland, which Edward initially granted to Henry de Lacy, Earl of Lincoln.

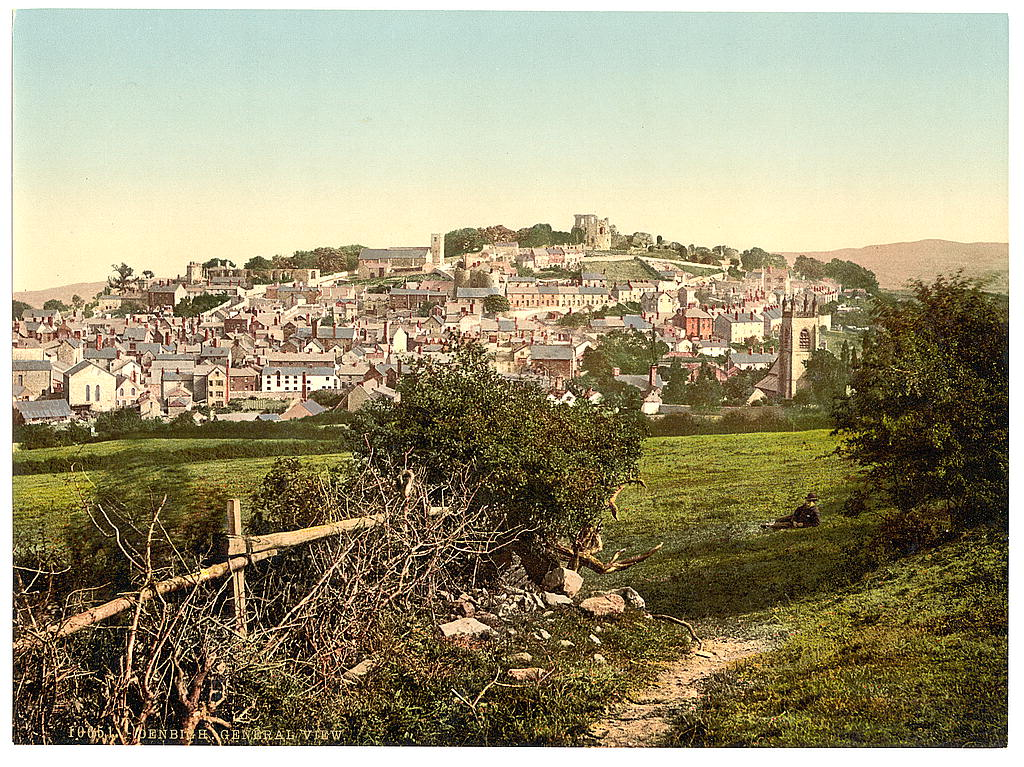
Denbigh, c.1895

As part of his campaign to take and retain control of the area, Edward I decided to fortify Denbigh, ordering the construction of Denbigh Castle and town walls, which were begun in 1282. The Burgess Gate, whose twin towers adorn the symbol on Denbigh's civic seal, was once the main entrance into the town. The town was involved in the revolt of Madog ap Llywelyn in 1294–1295; the castle was captured in the autumn and, on 11 November 1294, a relieving force was defeated by the Welsh rebels. The town was recaptured by Edward I in December. Denbigh was also burnt in 1400 during the revolt of Owain Glyndŵr.

During the Wars of the Roses (1455–1487), the town within the walls was largely destroyed. The focus of the settlement then shifted to a site immediately outside the old town walls to the north-east, centred on a market place along High Street.

In 1536, the new county of Denbighshire was created under the Laws in Wales Act 1535, comprising the old lordship of Denbighland plus other territories. Denbigh was declared to be the county town, with the county's courts directed to be held alternately at Denbigh and Wrexham. The County Hall (now the library) was built in 1572 to serve as the town's main public building, functioning as a market hall, town hall and courthouse for when the county's courts sat in Denbigh.

Leicester's Church is an unfinished church. In 1579, Robert Dudley, 1st Earl of Leicester, who was also Baron of Denbigh, planned for there to be a cathedral. His intention was to move the status of city from neighbouring St Asaph. The project ran out of money and, when Robert Dudley died, it was left as ruins; it is now in the care of Cadw.

In 1643, during the English Civil War, Denbigh became a refuge for a Royalist garrison. Surrendering in 1646, the castle and town walls eventually fell into ruin.

The town grew around the textile industry in the 1600s, hosting specialist glovers, weavers, smiths, shoemakers, saddlers, furriers and tanners. Denbigh has been an important location for the agricultural industry throughout its history.

=== Railway ===
Denbigh railway station once served the town on the former London and North Western Railway, later part of the London, Midland and Scottish Railway.

It was a junction for the Vale of Clwyd Railway line, which lead north to St Asaph and Rhyl, and the Mold and Denbigh Junction Railway. The former was closed in 1955, leaving Denbigh on a lengthy branch running from Chester to Ruthin, via Mold, which subsequently closed in 1962. A southern continuation beyond Ruthin, linking up with the Great Western Railway at Corwen, had closed in 1952.

The station site has been redeveloped since into a small retail park; however, remains of a platform can still be seen beside the road.

=== North Wales Hospital ===
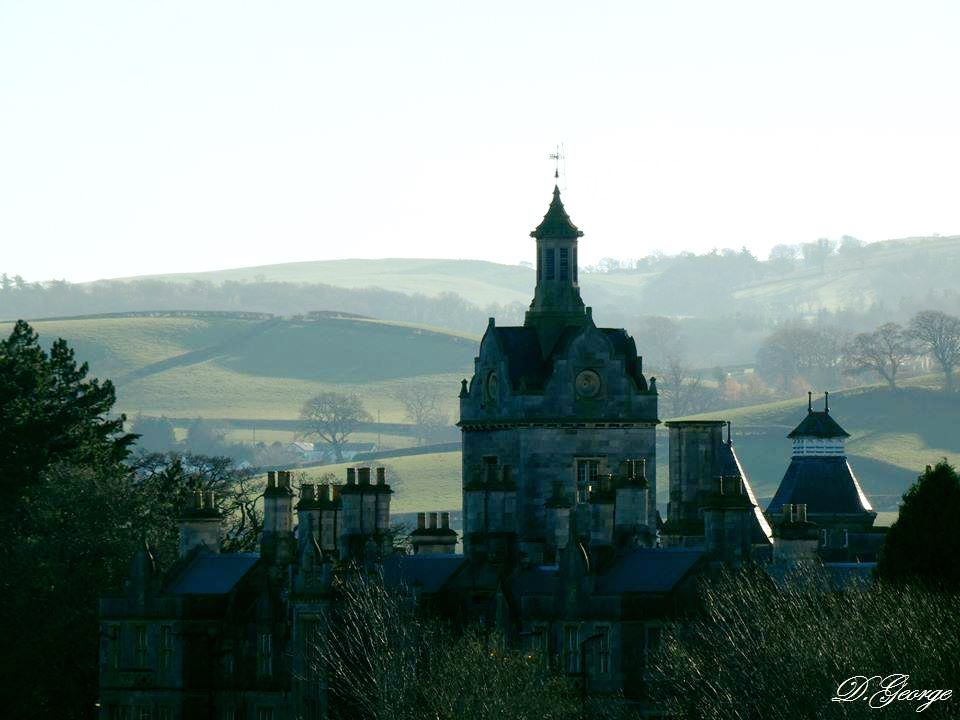
The old hospital in Denbigh

The North Wales Hospital was established in the 1840s, caring for people with psychiatric illnesses. The hospital became the town's largest employer. The hospital closed in 1995 and has since fallen into disrepair. In October 2008, a special series of episodes of Most Haunted, titled Village of the Damned, was broadcast from the North Wales Hospital over 7 days. As of October 2018, the derelict building has passed into the ownership of Denbighshire County Council.

=== Cinema ===
Denbigh had a town cinema on Love Lane. It opened as the Scala in 1928, before being re-branded as the Wedgwood Cinema in the late 1970s. It closed in October 1980. In 1995, Peter Moore reopened the cinema for a short period before being arrested and convicted of the murder of four men. The video rental store closed and the building is now in ruin awaiting redevelopment. Denbigh has no permanent cinema, though Denbigh Film Club regularly operates in Theatr Twm o'r Nant.

== Governance ==
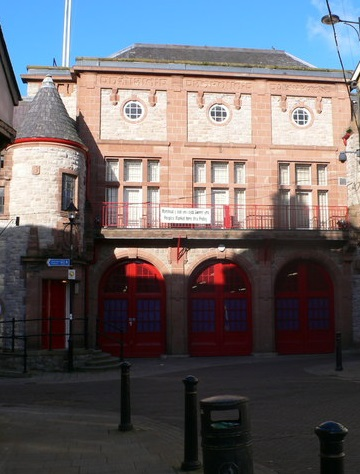
Denbigh Town Hall

There are two tiers of local government covering Denbigh, at community (town) and county level: Denbigh Town Council (Cyngor Tref Dinbych) and Denbighshire County Council (Cyngor Sir Ddinbych). The town council is based at Denbigh Town Hall on Crown Square.

=== Administrative history ===
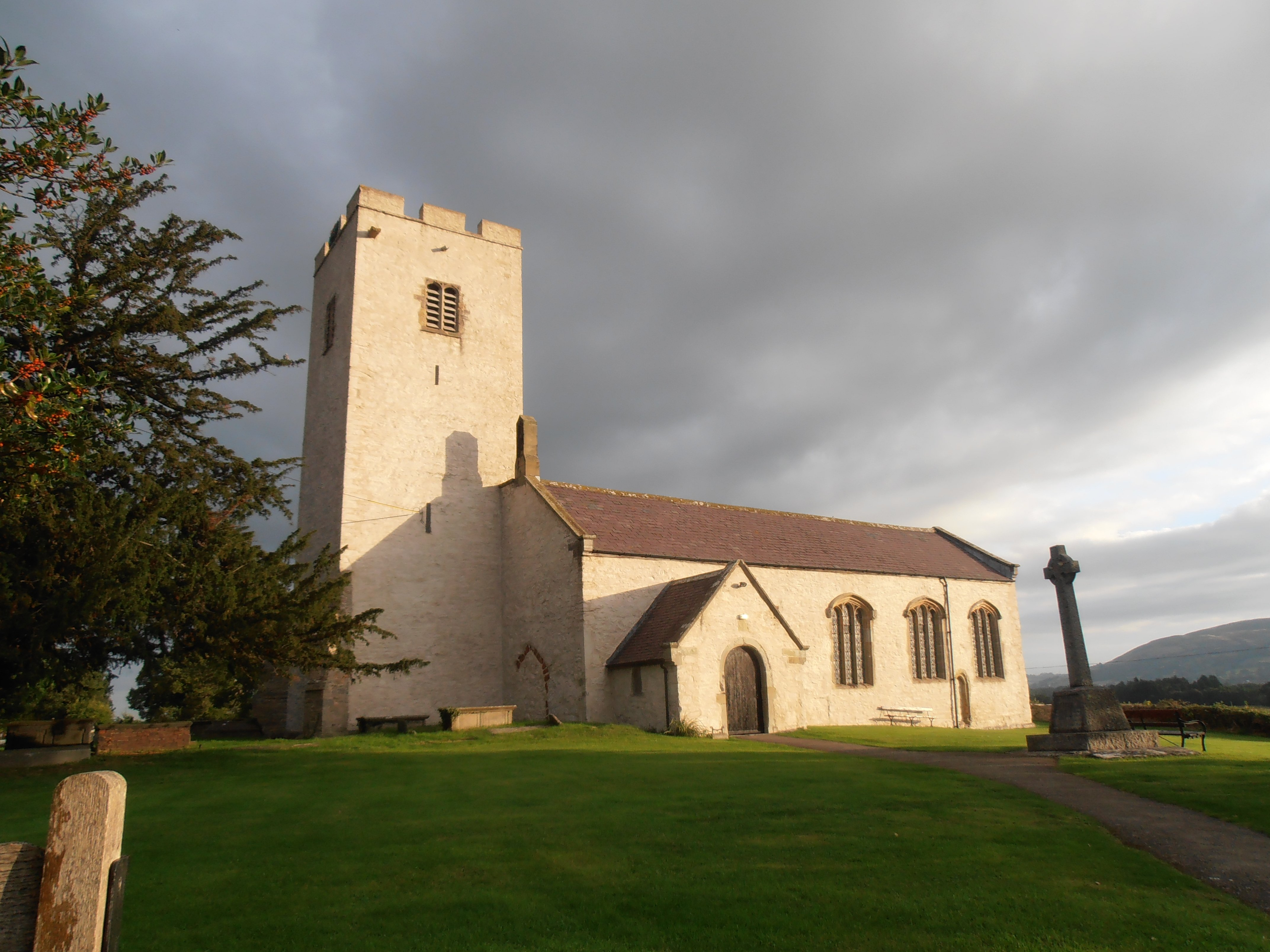
St Marcella's Church

Denbigh was an ancient parish and an ancient borough, with its earliest known municipal charter being granted by Henry de Lacy, Earl of Lincoln; it is undated but was presumably issued shortly after he was given control of the town and surrounding lordship in 1284. The original parish church of St Marcella was rebuilt around the same time the town was fortified in the late 13th century, but stands 1 mile (1.6 km) to the east of the walled town it was built to serve. The borough covered a larger area than the parish, also including parts of the neighbouring parishes of Henllan and Llanrhaeadr-yng-Nghinmeirch.

The borough was reformed to become a municipal borough in 1836 under the Municipal Corporations Act 1835, which standardised how most boroughs operated across the country.

Denbigh gradually lost the functions associated with being a county town. By the 18th century, the senior courts for the county (the great sessions prior to 1832, thereafter the assizes) were routinely held at Wrexham rather than Denbigh, before moving to a new courthouse built in Ruthin in the 1780s. The county's quarter sessions continued to be held alternately at Denbigh and Wrexham. The assizes and quarter sessions were abolished in 1972. Knights of the shire (MPs for the Denbighshire constituency) were elected at Denbigh until the constituency's abolition in 1885.

The first Denbighshire County Council was created in 1889, taking over various administrative functions previously performed by the county's magistrates at the quarter sessions. The county council decided not to meet in a single town. It initially met alternately at Denbigh and Wrexham, as the quarter sessions did. By 1900 it had added Ruthin and Colwyn Bay to the list of towns where it met, meeting at those four towns in rotation until that first incarnation of the county council was abolished in 1974. Although the council held its meetings in multiple towns, it decided to consolidate its main offices in a central location. It therefore built the County Offices at Ruthin, which opened in 1909.

The borough of Denbigh was abolished in 1974 under the Local Government Act 1972. The area became part of the new district of Glyndŵr in Clwyd. The area of the pre-1974 borough became a community called Denbigh, with its community council taking the name Denbigh Town Council. The upper tiers of local government were reorganised again in 1996, when the modern Denbighshire, and its county council were created.

== Population ==
The 1841 census showed the population to be 5,238 inhabitants.

The population at the 2001 Census was 8,783, increasing to 8,986 in the 2011 census., reducing in the 2021 census to 8,669.

== Amenities ==
Map of Denbigh, with locations of key sites.

Attractions in the town include Denbigh Library, Denbigh Castle and the castle walls, Cae Dai 1950s museum, Theatr Twm o'r Nant, medieval parish church St Marcella's, and a small shopping complex. Denbigh Boxing Club is located on Middle Lane. Denbigh Community Hospital was established in 1807. Denbigh Town Hall is a Grade II* listed building.

Denbigh Cricket Club is one of the oldest cricket clubs in Wales having been established in 1844. The club plays at the Ystrad Road ground and plays in the North Wales Cricket League. The 1st XI play in the Premier Division having won the Division 1 championship in 2010 with the 2nd XI in Division 3.

For over 50 years, a barrel rolling competition has been held on Boxing Day in the town square.

== Secondary schools ==
There are three secondary schools located in Denbigh. Denbigh High School is the larger of the two, consisting of nearly 600 pupils and approximately 60 staff. The current headmaster is Glen Williams.

St Brigid's is a Catholic voluntary aided school on Mold Road on the outskirts of the town which caters for pupils between the ages of 3 – 19. There is a strict admissions policy and until 2009 the school only accepted girls. The schools current headteacher is Leah Crimes.

Myddleton College is the former Howell's Preparatory School and is an independent co-educational day and boarding school.

All 3 of these High Schools in Denbigh, along with Ysgol Brynhyfryd (Ruthin), Ysgol Glan Clwyd (St Asaph), Denbigh College, and Llysfasi College (Deeside) have joined to offer a combined 6th form under the title 'The Dyffryn Clwyd Consortium'.

== Site of Special Scientific Interest ==
Crest Mawr Wood (alt. - Crêst) is a Site of Special Scientific Interest to the north west, adjoining Denbigh Golf Club and the Tarmac Quarry, an historic and ancient deciduous woodland. This woodland is endangered due to environmental pressure and competing land use in the area.

== National Eisteddfodau ==
Denbigh hosted the National Eisteddfod of Wales in 1882, 1939, 2001 and 2013.

The Urdd National Eisteddfod came to Denbigh in 2022.

== Notable people ==
Robert Dudley, 1st Earl of Leicester, 1564

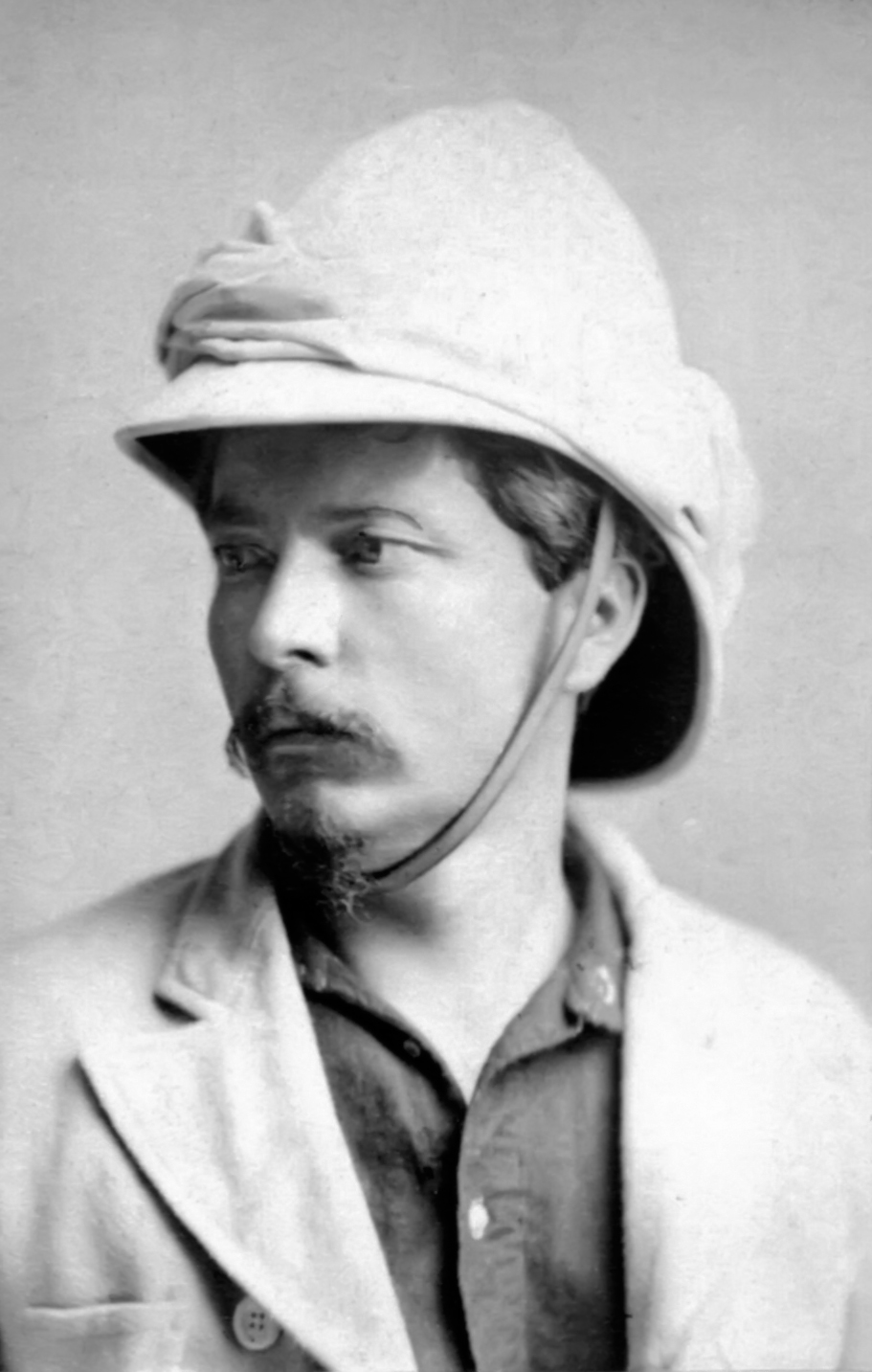
Henry Morton Stanley 1872

Note: Earl of Denbigh is an extant title of nobility held since 1622 by the Feilding family of Warwickshire. Despite taking their title from the town they are not known to have any other connection.

- Rhoda Broughton (1840–1920), novelist
- Elizabeth Casson (1881–1954) doctor and occupational therapy pioneer.
- Shefali Chowdhury (born 1988), actor, notably in the Harry Potter films
- CDawgVA (born 1996), YouTuber and podcaster, presenter of Trash Taste
- Robert Dudley, 1st Earl of Leicester (1532–1588), also known as Baron of Denbigh
- Thomas Gee (1815–1898), a Welsh Nonconformist preacher, journalist and publisher.
- David Griffith (1800–1894), known as "Clwydfardd" a Welsh poet and Archdruid of the National Eisteddfod of Wales.
- Dr Samuel Johnson (1709–1784), visited friends and relation in Denbigh many times and has an urn memorial in his honour in the woods nearby.
- Professor Edward Taylor Jones (1872–1961), physicist
- Eirian Llwyd (1951–2014), printmaker and wife of former Plaid Cymru leader Ieuan Wyn Jones
- Humphrey Llwyd (1527–1568), a Welsh cartographer, author, antiquary and MP.
- Sir Hugh Myddleton (1560–1631), royal jeweller, goldsmith and entrepreneur.
- Thomas Myddelton (1550–1631) a Welsh merchant, Lord Mayor of London and MP
- Twm o'r Nant (1739–1810), playwright, real name Thomas Edwards
- Beatrix Potter (1866–1943), spent summers with her aunt and uncle at Gwaenynog Hall between 1895 and 1913 and used their large garden as inspiration for The Tale of Peter Rabbit
- Susan Reynolds (1929–2021) a medieval historian
- Kate Roberts (1891–1985), Welsh language writer.
- Several members of the Salusbury Family, who represented Denbigh over the years.
- Sir Henry Morton Stanley (1841–1904), a journalist and explorer
- Mark Webster (born 1983) Welsh darts international, winner of the BDO World Darts Championship 2008
- Bryn Williams (born 1977), TV chef who won the Great British Menu BBC TV programme.
- Amber Davies (born 1996), Welsh singer and actress

== Gallery ==
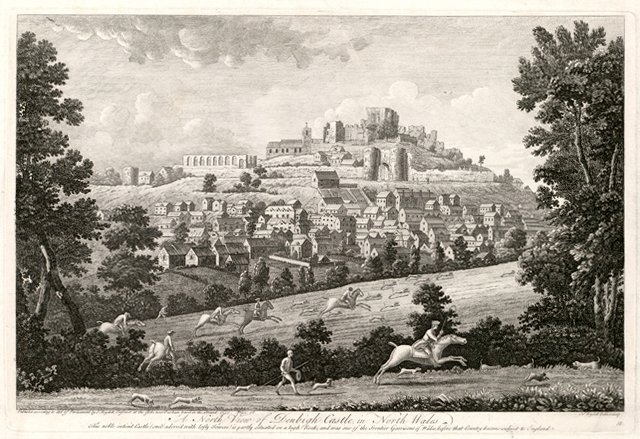
1750 hunting scene by John Boydell

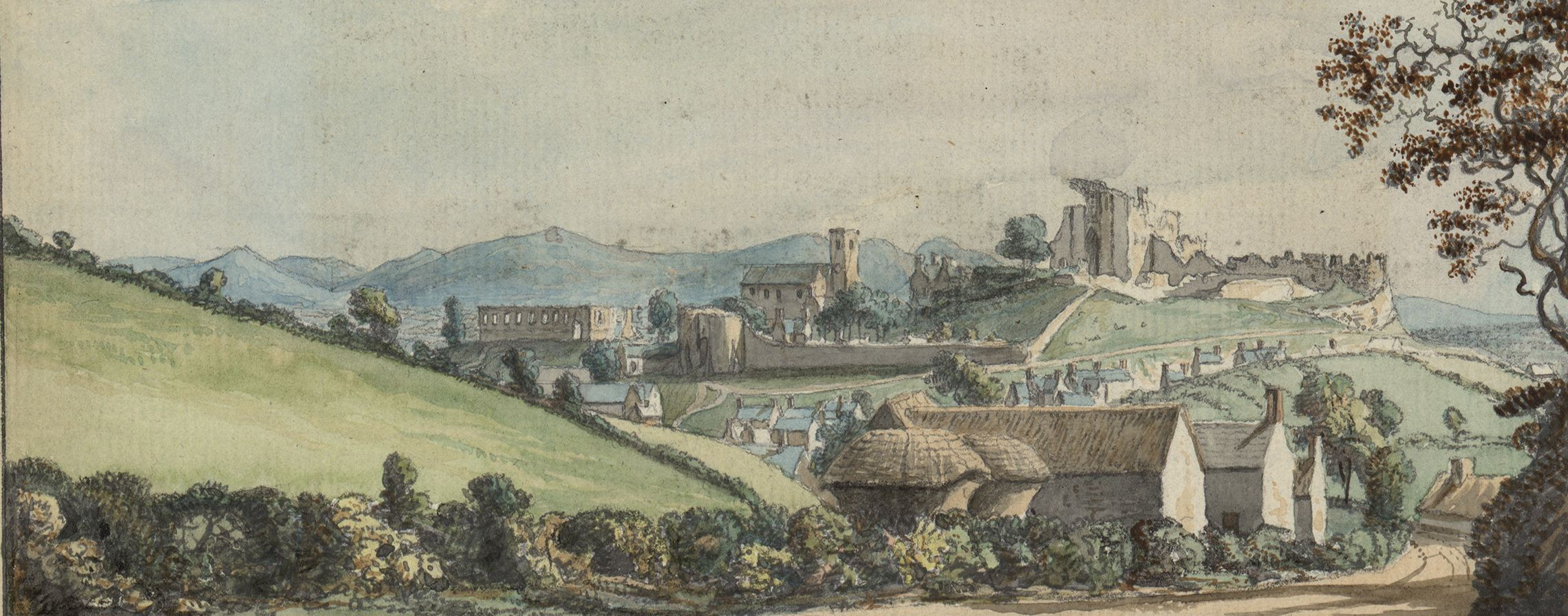
Denbigh c.1778 from Thomas Pennant's A Tour in Wales

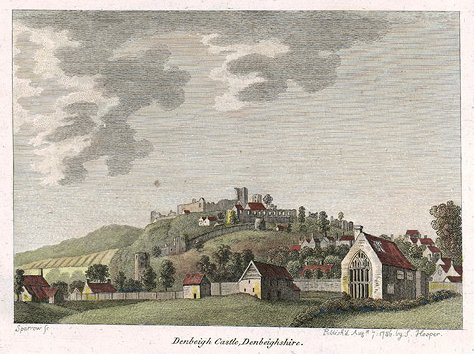
Town and castle in 1786

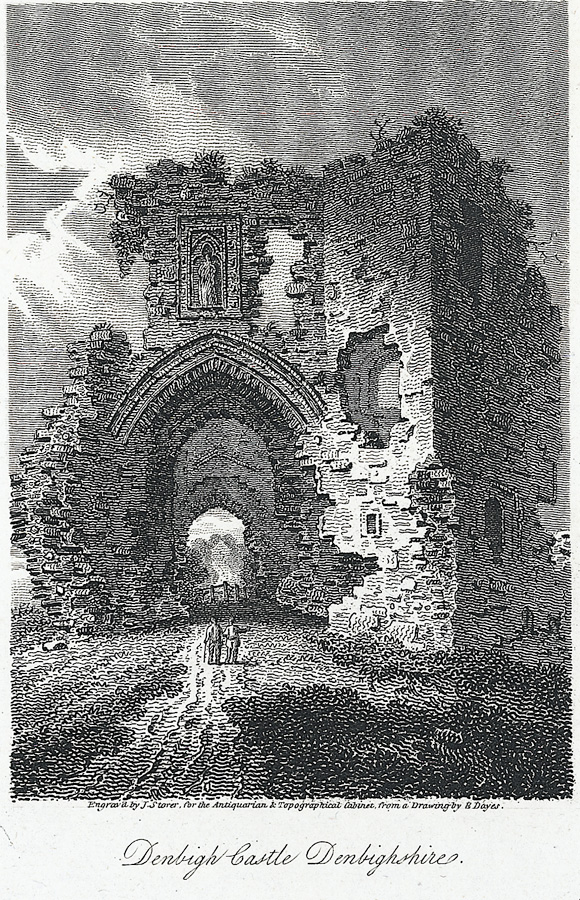
1808 engraving by James Storer

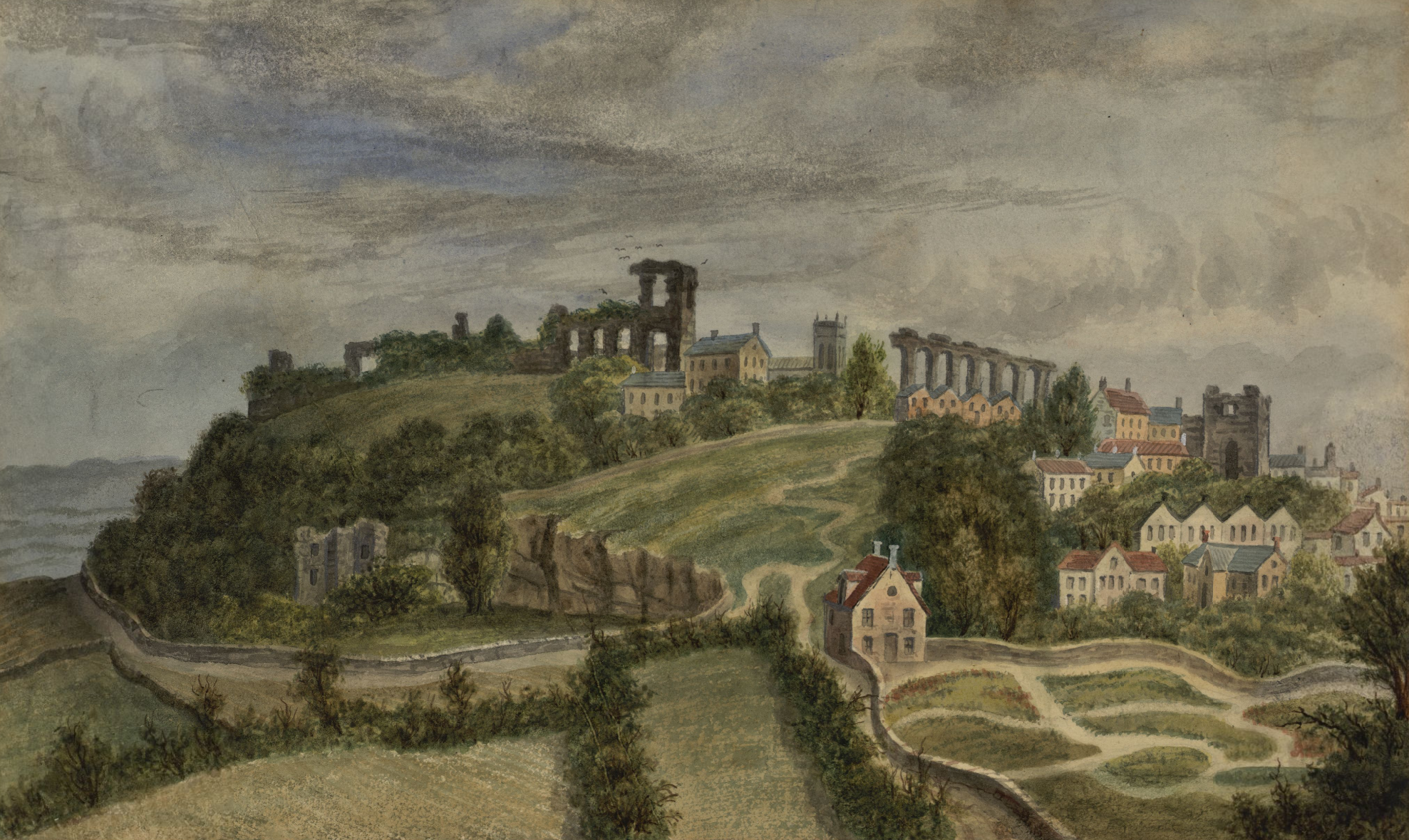
Denbigh painted by a travelling French artist c.1830

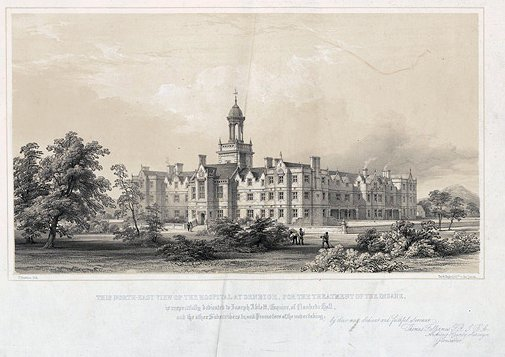
North-east view of the hospital, 1850s

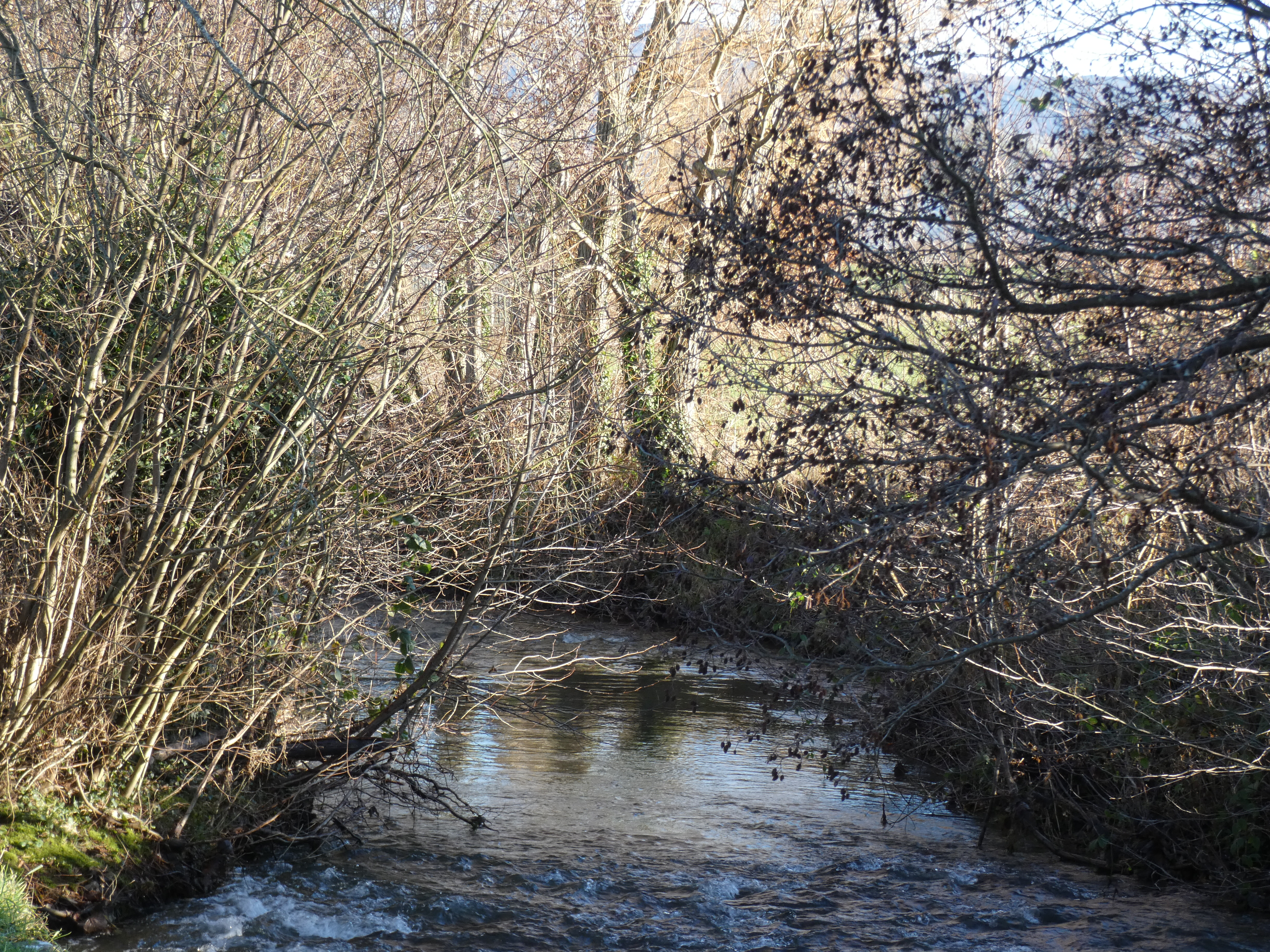
Fairytale River
