= Coedydd Dyffryn Alwen =

Protected area in Clwyd, Wales

- Site of Special Scientific Interest
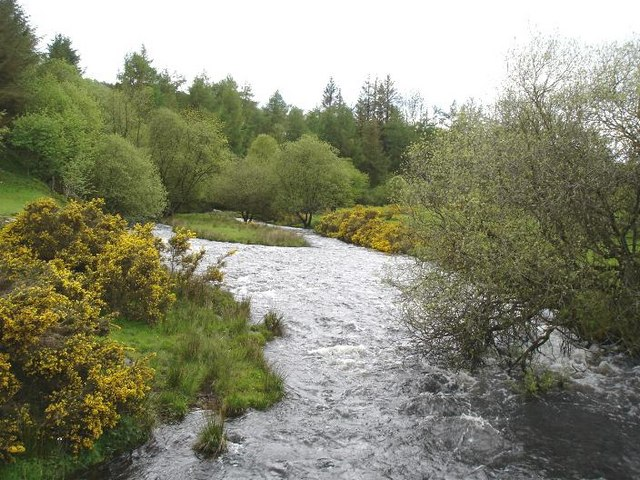
- Trees on the banks of the Afon Alwen

- Location within Wales
- Location of Coedydd Dyffryn Alwen.
- Area of search: Clwyd
- Grid reference: SJ0014147618
- Coordinates: 53.016515°N 3.4900015°W
- Interest: Biological
- Area: 42.82 ha (105.8 acres)
- Notification date: 5 February 2003

Coedydd Dyffryn Alwen is a Site of Special Scientific Interest in the preserved county of Clwyd, north Wales.

It contains a mix of different woodland types, reflecting the underlying geology and soil type, including ash, oak and rowan, with a hazel understorey, with a rich ground flora including globe flower, oak and beech fern.

== See also ==
- List of Sites of Special Scientific Interest in Clwyd
