= Flint Mountain =

Village in Flintshire, Wales

Coordinates: 53.223°N 3.140°W

Flint Mountain: Welsh: Mynydd-y-Fflint
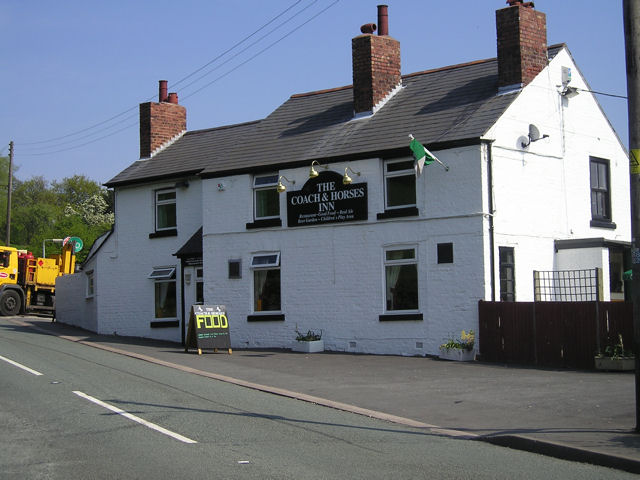
- The Coach & Horses Inn public house, Flint Mountain

- Location within Flintshire
- Population: 1,985 (2006 Info)
- OS grid reference: SJ239701
- Community: Flint
- Principal area: Flintshire
- Preserved county: Clwyd
- Country: Wales
- Sovereign state: United Kingdom
- Post town: FLINT
- Postcode district: CH6
- Dialling code: 01352
- Police: North Wales
- Fire: North Wales
- Ambulance: Welsh
- UK Parliament: Alyn and Deeside
- Senedd Cymru – Welsh Parliament: Delyn

Flint Mountain (Welsh: Mynydd-y-Fflint) is a small village seated in Flintshire, North Wales, approximately 12 miles west of the city of Chester, midway between Mold and Flint, and situated just off junction 33 of the A55 North Wales Expressway. Points of interest include the Coach and Horses pub, and local football club Flint Mountain FC. In mid-2006, the population of Flint Mountain was 1,958.

On clear days to the north and east, The Wirral can be seen.
