= Coed Gorswen National Nature Reserve =

Nature reserve in Conwy Valley, Wales

Coordinates: 53.222°N 3.860°W

Coed Gorswen National Nature Reserve lies on the lower slopes of the Conwy Valley, in the vicinity of Rowen and Llanbedr-y-Cennin.

Its gentle landscape of small woodlands, grazed fields and lattice of hedgerows creates an attractive and peaceful lowland scene. Boulders up to the size of cars scattered across the reserve provide striking evidence of Ice Age activity. Its bouldery nature is perhaps what protected the woodland over the centuries as surrounding land was cleared for human use.
