= Crest Mawr Wood =

Protected area in Clwyd, Wales

Crest Mawr Wood is a Site of Special Scientific Interest in the preserved county of Clwyd, north Wales. In 2021, there was a proposal to re-route a walking path to make way for a quarry at the site.

== See also ==
- List of Sites of Special Scientific Interest in Clwyd
