= Graig, Llanarmon-yn-Ial =

Protected area in Clwyd, Wales

Graig, Llanarmon-yn-Iâl
- Site of Special Scientific Interest
- Location within Wales
- Location of Graig, Llanarmon-yn-Iâl.
- Area of search: Wales
- Grid reference: SJ2008956585
- Coordinates: 53.100457°N 3.1949537°W
- Interest: Biological
- Area: 22.3 ha (55 acres)
- Notification date: 15 September 1999

Graig, Llanarmon-yn-Ial is a Site of Special Scientific Interest in the preserved county of Clwyd, north Wales.

== See also ==
- List of Sites of Special Scientific Interest in Clwyd
