= Clogau Quarry =

Protected area in Clwyd, Wales

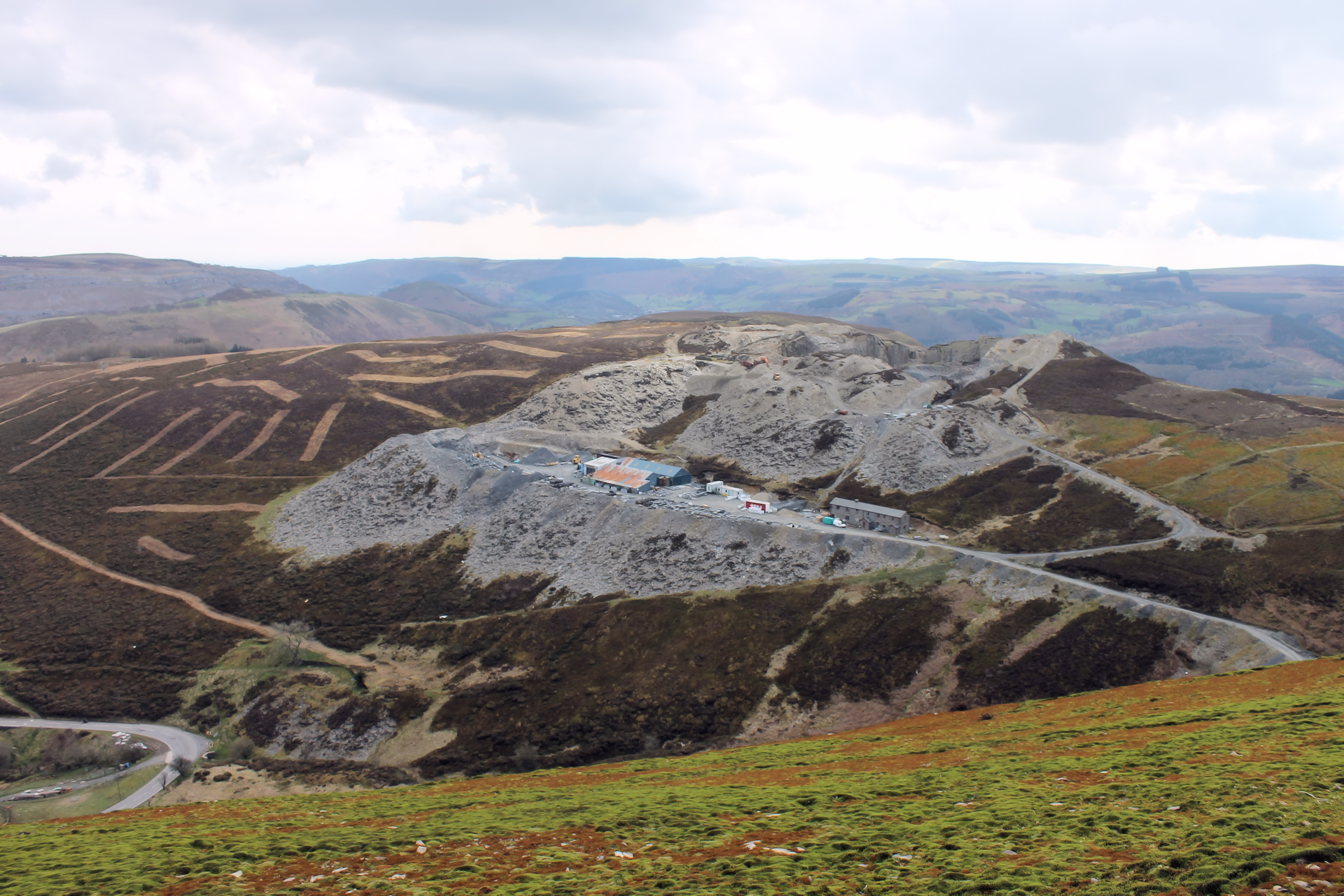
Clogau Quarry; 2022

Clogau Quarry (also known as the Berwyn Slate Quarry) is a quarry which is a Site of Special Scientific Interest located in Denbighshire, Wales. It supports the Llangollen canal, along with the Oernant Quarry. The quarry is used for hearths, worktops, tombstones and billiard tables.

== Description ==
Clogau Quarry is located on the east side of Moel y Gamelin (also known as the Maesyrychen Mountain). It's situated 1360 feet above sea level.

== History ==
The Clogau Quarry was first established in 1690, making it one of the oldest quarries in Wales. It is believed that the Quarry was never used until the 19th century.
