= North Wales Wildlife Trust =

Wildlife Trust in Wales

- Ymddiriedolaeth Natur Gogledd Cymru
- Predecessor: North Wales Naturalists
- Formation: 1962; 64 years ago
- Type: Registered Charity
- Headquarters: Bangor, Gwynedd
- Location: 36 reserves (1,821 acres in total), six local branches
- Region served: North Wales, UK
- Members: 9,000+ (April 2024)
- Key people: Frances Cattanach, CEO
- Revenue: £5,585,791 (2024)
- Employees: 50+ (2024)
- Volunteers: 700+
- Website: northwaleswildlifetrust.org.uk

The North Wales Wildlife Trust (NWWT) (Welsh: Ymddiriedolaeth Natur Gogledd Cymru) is the Wildlife Trust for North Wales. Established in 1962, it covers the vice counties of Anglesey, Caernarfonshire, Merionethshire, Denbighshire and Flintshire and has over 9300 members. It is a registered charity and a member of the Wildlife Trusts Partnership with the head office being located in Bangor and its eastern office located at Aberduna nature reserve in Flintshire.

The aims of the NWWT are:

- To conserve north Wales' wildlife for the future.
- To increase the understanding of north Wales' wildlife and its natural environment.
- To apply this knowledge of practical wildlife conservation in nature reserves and elsewhere throughout north Wales.
- To enhance the enjoyment of and access to north Wales' wildlife by members of the public.

== History ==
The history of the NWWT can be traced back to 1953 when two botanists, RH Roberts, a local headmaster, and WS "Bill" Lacey, a lecturer in University College of North Wales, carried out vegetation surveys and recommended that the fens of Cors Goch and Cors Geirch be acquired as nature reserves. In 1962, the Society for the Promotion of Nature Reserves stepped in to make a holding purchase until a local conservation body could be established to buy and manage nature reserves. In 1962, 65 people met and formed The North Wales Naturalists, from which a council of ten was elected, with Colonel JC Wynn Finch as chairman and Dr WS Lacey as Hon Secretary. By 1965, the Trust had 359 members and three nature reserves covering just over 145 acres (59 ha). Over the following years, several other local Trusts would provide their reserves and assets to the North Wales Naturalists and some larger branches would be separated to form independent Trusts; in 1972 West Wales Trust formed the Meirionnydd Branch, in 1982 Montgomeryshire Branch became the Montgomeryshire Trust for Nature Conservation, and in 1988 the Trust was renamed as the 'North Wales Wildlife Trust'.

== Bill Lacey (Lacey Lecture) ==
The annual Lacey Lecture, presented by the NWWT, is a tradition which has been going for over 15 years. It is in memory of Professor William Lacey, known as 'Bill' Lacey, who achieved great academic distinction and international standing in palaeobotany. He was also a teacher and a practical man when it came to conservation. He became the NWWT's first secretary, was its chairman for 14 years and then president.

Lacey was an academic, teacher and practical conservationist.

*2023 Jake Davies
- 2022 Craig Bennett
- 2021 Erica McAlister (from BBC radio 4)
- 2020 Paul Allen (of CAT)
- 2019 Dave Goulson
- 2018 Philip Hoare
- 2017 Peter Smith (of the Wildwood Trust)
- 2016 Trevor Dines
- 2015 Nick Baker
- 2014 Nigel Brown
- 2013 Chris Baines (second lecture)
- 2012 Natasha de Vere
- 2011 Mike Dilger
- 2010 Graham Harvey
- 2009 Callum Roberts
- 2008 Brent Elliot
- 2007 Paul Evans
- 2006 Michael Leach
- 2005 Aubrey Manning
- 2004 Jill Attenborough
- 2003 Iolo Williams
- 2002 Chris Baines
- 2001 Robert Swan

== Reserves ==
The NWWT manages the following 35 nature reserves (1,821 acres (737 ha) in total):

- Abercorris
- Aberduna
- Big Pool Wood
- Blaen y Weirglodd
- Bryn Pydew
- Caeau Pen y Clip
- Caeau Tan y Bwlch
- Cemlyn
- Coed Cilygroeslwyd
- Coed Crafnant
- Coed Porth-aml
- Coed Trellyniau
- Coed y Felin
- Cors Bodgynydd
- Cors Goch
- Cors-y-Sarnau
- Ddôl Uchaf
- Eithinog
- Gogarth (with a trust shop on the summit complex of the Great Orme)
- Gors Maen Llwyd
- Graig Wyllt
- Gwaith Powdwr
- Llyn Celanedd (formerly known as the Spinnies, Aberogwen)
- Maes Hiraddug
- Marford Quarry
- Mariandyrys
- Minera Quarry (part of Minera SSSI)
- Morfa Bychan
- Nantporth
- Old Pulford Brook Meadows
- Pisgah Quarry
- Porth Diana
- Rhiwledyn
- Traeth Glaslyn
- Y Graig

The NWWT also owns 450 acres at Bryn Ifan, where it intends to restore Celtic rainforests to the upland farms.

NWWT runs four Living Landscapes projects, extending conservation work off reserves and onto private sites by working with landowners. They are currently the Alun and Chwiler, Anglesey Fens, River Dee and Wrexham Industrial Estate Living Landscapes. This work improves opportunities for people and wildlife and follows the principles of bigger, better and more connected landscapes. Within the Wrexham Industrial Estate project the trust manages sites on behalf of corporate bodies, while further supporting other organisations to advise best management practices for wildlife conservation on their own land.

"We work with businesses, landholders, farmers and community groups on and around the Wrexham Industrial Estate, advising on conservation land management and improving connectivity for wildlife across one of the largest industrial areas in the UK. This involves carrying out surveys for conservation priority species, mapping habitats and drawing up management prescriptions for businesses operating on the industrial estate." - Jonny Hulson, Living Landscape Officer

Other projects run by NWWT include:

Living seas, which helps run Seagrass Ocean Rescue in conjunction with World Wide Fund for Nature, Project Seagrass and Swansea University.

Project SIARC, which won Wales Project of the Year in the 2023 National Lottery Awards.

The Stand for Nature Youth project, including a climate conservation traineeship once a year.

The Welsh Beaver project, and a variety of invasive and non-native species work.

The charity has 2 subsidiaries, NWWT trading company, and Enfys Ecology.

== Local branches ==
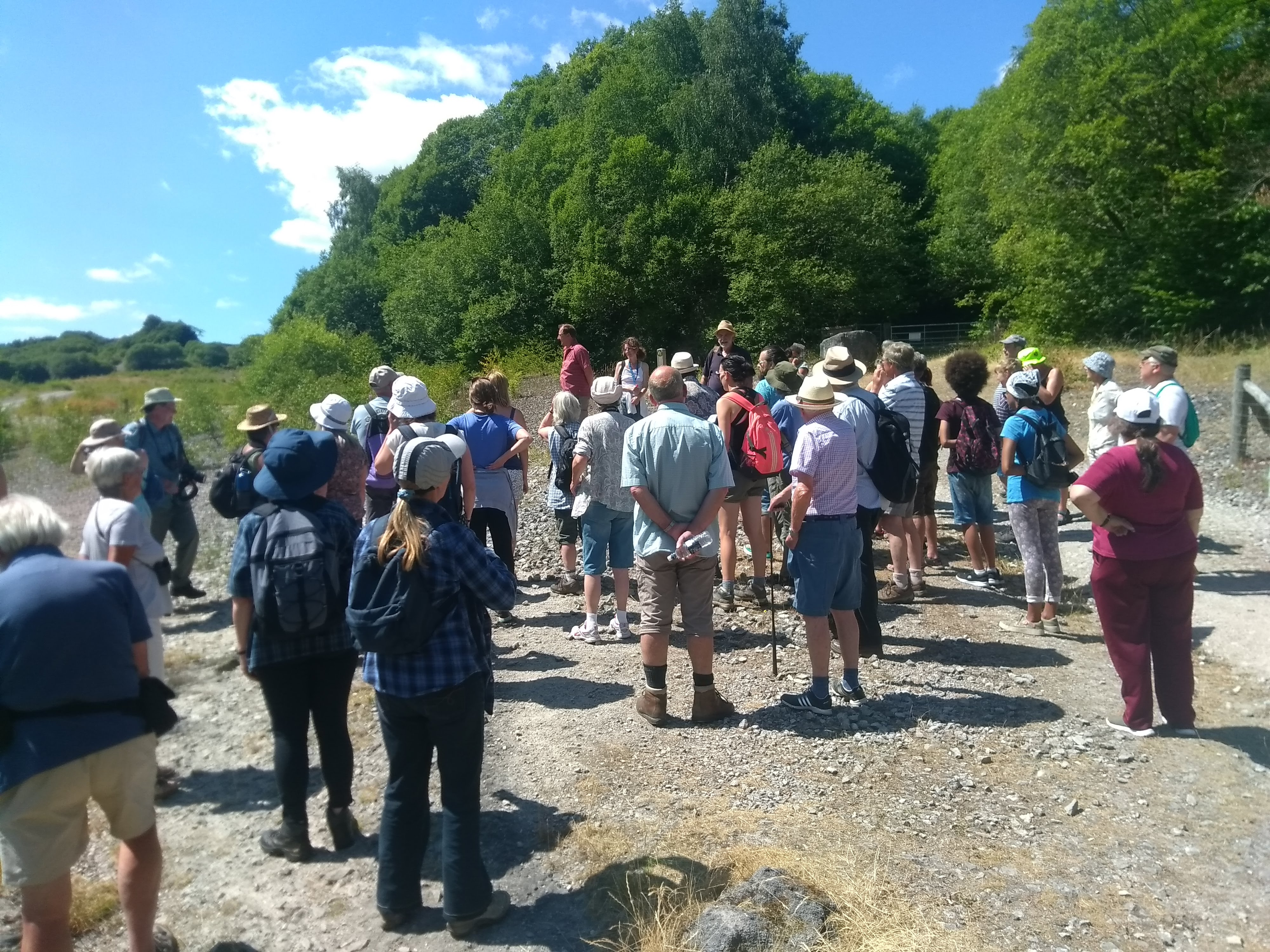
Wrexham Branch of North Wales Wildlife Trust walk in Minera Quarry (2018)

It has local members branches (who organise and lead local walks, talks and meetings), each member of the NWWT will automatically become a member of their local branch, however. They are:

- Anglesey Branch
- Conwy Valley Branch
- Arfon Branch
- Clwydian Branch (covering Denbighshire and Flintshire)
- Meirionydd Branch
- Wrexham & Dee Valley Branch
