= Hendre Bach =

Protected area in Clwyd, Wales

- Site of Special Scientific Interest
- Location within Wales
- Location of Hendre Bach.
- Area of search: Clwyd
- Grid reference: SJ1040376767
- Coordinates: 53.28028°N 3.3452432°W
- Interest: Biological
- Area: 2.28 ha (5.6 acres)
- Notification date: 16 March 2000

Hendre Bach is a Site of Special Scientific Interest in the preserved county of Clwyd, north Wales.

== See also ==
- List of Sites of Special Scientific Interest in Clwyd
