= List of SSSIs in Clwyd =

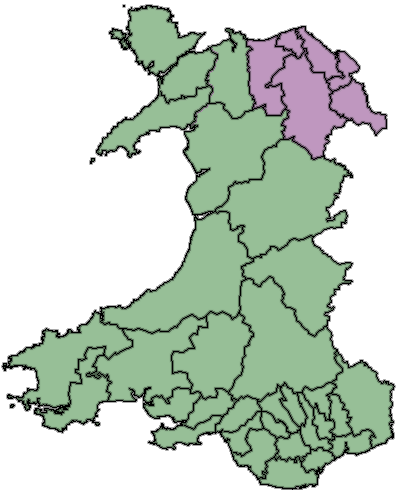
Clwyd AOS

Lists of Sites of Special Scientific Interest in Clwyd comprise:

- List of Sites of Special Scientific Interest in Conwy County Borough (east)
- List of Sites of Special Scientific Interest in Denbighshire
- List of Sites of Special Scientific Interest in Flintshire
- List of Sites of Special Scientific Interest in Powys (small part)
- List of Sites of Special Scientific Interest in Wrexham County Borough
