= Celtic rainforests in Wales =

Temperate rainforests in Wales

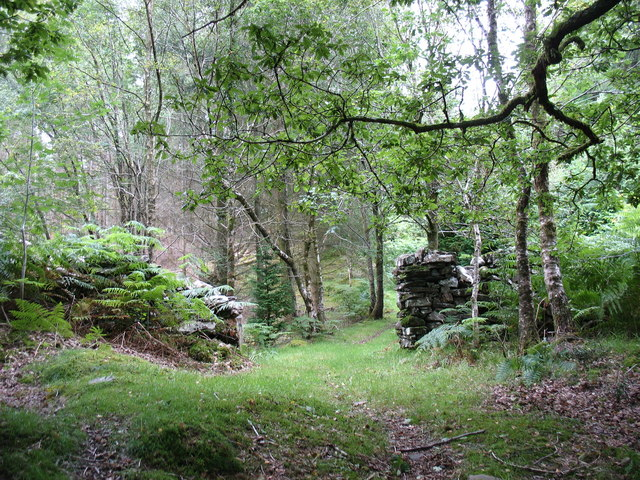
Near Ceunant Llennyrch

There are various areas of temperate rainforests in Wales, also termed a "Celtic rainforest". They are located largely in river valleys, adjacent to the sea, on Wales' western coasts, particularly in Snowdonia (Eryri), Powys and Ceredigion.

Various organisations have been making efforts to maintain the existing rainforests, or even to extend them or keep them protected from invasive species. It has been estimated that up to 50% of Wales' land area could become/have been areas of temperate rainforest.

== Background and history ==
A Celtic rainforest, also known as a temperate or Atlantic rainforest or woodland, is found in areas with "high oceanicity", those that are highly influenced by the sea. These areas are characterised by high rainfall and humidity, but also low yearly variation in temperature. Great Britain contains 70,000 hectares (173,000 acres) of these rainforests, making up only 1% of its area, and they are a habitat for ancient ash, birch, oak, pine and hazel woodlands. More generally in Wales, there are about 95,000 hectares (230,000 acres) of ancient oak woodlands, with some having over 3,000 mm of rainfall, and Wales being home to half of Western Atlantic Sessile Oak. The rainforests are considered to be highly biodiverse, as the high humidity and stable temperatures provide perfect conditions for moisture-dependent lichens and bryophytes (such as mosses and liverworts).

They are quite rare habitats, usually located near to the sea. The forests provide optimal conditions for the growing of rare plants, lichens and forest fungi. In Wales, they are mainly situated in river valleys of North and Mid Wales. Historically, up to 10,000 years ago, these rainforests were more widespread, covering a lot of the western seaboard of Britain, as well as across Wales, but are now limited to largely inaccessible areas, such as steep river gorges and ungrazed hillsides. These temperate rainforests are said to be under more threat than tropical rainforests, and as "globally significant".

Some birds found in these rainforests may include, grey wagtails, dippers, pied flycatchers, redstarts, treecreepers and wood warblers.

There is a conservation project in Snowdonia (Eryri) to protect and restore the forests, as well as a wider "Celtic Rainforests Wales" (CRW) project covering north-west and west Wales, including Snowdonia (Eryri), Cwm Einion, Cwm Doethie – Mynydd Mallaen and the Elan Valley. CRW aims to rid the areas of invasive species and improve their management, such as wood grazing to prevent overgrazing. Examples of invasive species include Rhododendron and non-native conifer.

To manage grazing, CRW's LIFE programme, used three Highland cattle to graze parts of the Royal Society for the Protection of Birds' estate in Coed-y-Parc, near Dolgellau, and later its site at Coed Garth Gell, to improve the conservation status of the ancient woodlands. The National Trust-managed Dolmelynllyn Estate, in Ganllwyd, also had success in the restoration of their woodland by using Highland cattle.

In 2015, the Woodland Trust bought Ceunant Llennyrch, a 220-hectare (550-acre) Celtic rainforest in Snowdonia.

In 2018, £8.5 million from the European Union and the Welsh Government were provided to support the areas of rainforest in Snowdonia, Cwm Einion, Cwm Doethie and the Elan Valley.

In 2019, £4.5 million from the European Commission's LIFE programme and £2 million from the Welsh Government were awarded to tackle invasive species, such as by introducing grazing cattle, sheep and ponies, as well as to encourage community involvement.

In 2021, The Wildlife Trusts Wales campaigned that Wales needs a "National Rainforest Strategy".

By 2023, the National Trust was operating a tree nursery in Snowdonia of 23,471 hectares (58,000 acres) to grow trees that can be then distributed to select locations in the area to maintain the health of local woodlands. It aims to grow 30,000 trees annually, especially of rare and endangered species, like Black poplar, or Climate change resilient trees, like Hornbeam, or just more biosecure and disease-resilient trees which are adapted to the localised climate of the rainforests. This is to stop any further deterioration of the rainforests due to invasive species, like Ash dieback. Other lands the National Trust manage are multiple remnants of rainforests such as those of Hafod Garregog, near Porthmadog.

In 2023, the Wildlife Trusts announced a project to restore and expand the rainforests across the British Isles, following a donation of £38 million from Aviva. The project will focus on Bryn Ifan in Gwynedd (under the North Wales Wildlife Trust), as well as Creg y Cowin on the Isle of Man.

In July 2023, £247,194 was awarded to Dŵr Cymru Welsh Water, to protect the Celtic rainforest in the Elan Valley.

== List of known rainforests ==
The Celtic rainforests in Wales are mainly situated in North Wales and Mid Wales, particularly river valleys of Ceredigion, Gwynedd (specifically Snowdonia) and Powys.

Some examples include:

- Coed Llechwedd Einion (Powys)
- Coed Cwm Einion (Ceredigion) – within Dyfi Biosphere, sometimes "Artists Valley".
- Coed Felenrhyd and Llennyrch (Snowdonia/Eryri) – Sometimes the "Meirionnydd Oakwoods"
- Coed Cymerau Isaf (Snowdonia/Eryri)
- Coed Ganllwyd (Snowdonia/Eryri)
- Coed Cadair (Snowdonia/Eryri)
- Coed Cors y Gedol (Snowdonia/Eryri)
- Coed Crafnant nature reserve
- "Cambrian Wildwood"
- Cwm Doethie – Mynydd Mallaen

The Woodland Trust acquired Coed Felenrhyd in 1991, and embarked on a programme to clear the area of the invasive rhododendron and to thin its conifers, which were planted after World War II and have stifled its ancient trees. The reserve was extended to Llennyrch Farm in 2015, after the trust purchased it. The Woodland Trust is the largest owner of Britain's existing rainforests, managing 3% of Wales' rainforests.

=== Historic extent ===
In 2022, the "Lost Rainforests of Britain" campaign launched an online map, using an index of hygrothermy showing the estimated historic/potential location of these rainforests in Great Britain. It estimated that up to 20% of Great Britain could have been suitable for these rainforests, with almost half of Wales fitting the criteria. Snowdonia and the Elenydd were identified as major areas containing zones of hypothesised temperate rainforests.

== See also ==
- National Forest for Wales
