= Celtic rainforest =

Temperate rainforest of the British Isles

Celtic rainforest is a colloquial term which refers to the temperate rainforest of Great Britain and Ireland. These woodlands are also variously referred to as Atlantic rainforest, Upland Oakwoods, Atlantic Oakwoods or Western Oakwoods. Today, the Celtic rainforests exist as small fragments of the temperate rainforest that once covered much of Ireland and the west coast of Great Britain. The majority of these fragments occur on steep-sided slopes above rivers and lakes which have avoided clearance and intensive grazing pressure.

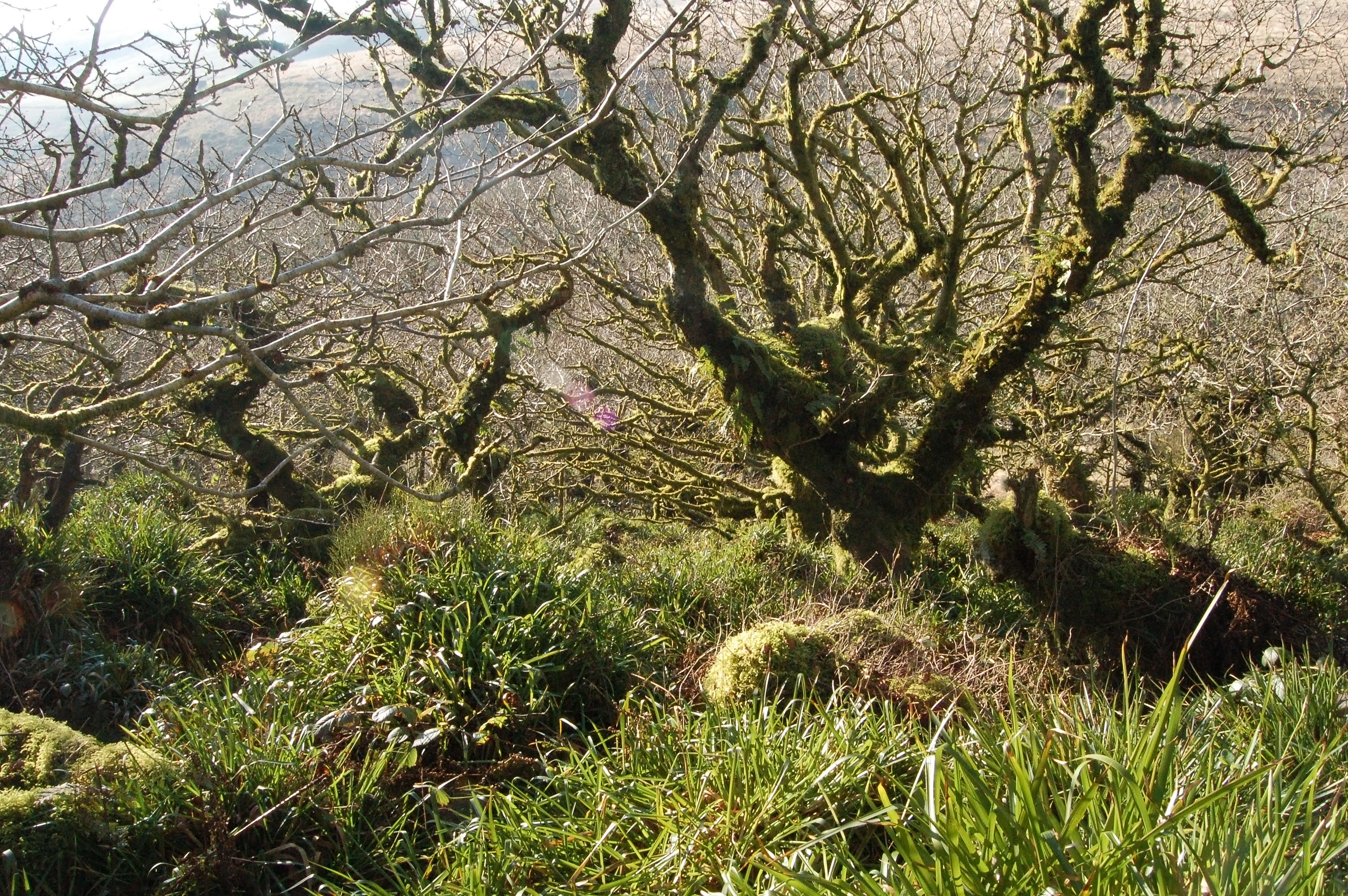
Wistman's Wood in Devon, a temperate rainforest

There are notable examples in Ireland especially along its western coast, including the Beara Rainforest in West Cork, the Great Forest of Aughty in counties Clare and Galway, Oldhead Wood in County Mayo and Ardnamona Wood and Glenveagh in County Donegal. In Scotland, rainforest exists on the islands and shores of Loch Maree, Loch Sunart, Loch Lomond, and one of the best preserved sites on the remote Taynish Peninsula in Argyll. In Wales, they occur on steep-sided riverine gorges in Snowdonia and Mid Wales. In England, there are examples in the Lake District (Borrowdale Woods), and steep-sided riverine and estuarine valleys in South West England, including the Fowey valley in Cornwall, and the valley of the River Dart which flows off Dartmoor, and has rainfall in excess of 2 metres per year.

== Physical conditions ==
Small annual temperature variation, high humidity, and high levels of annual precipitation makes Celtic Rainforest an important habitat for numerous common and rare species of mosses, liverworts, and lichens. The Scottish Natural History Scientific Advisory Committee writes, "the whole area is a lichenologists’ Mecca". There is an exceptional number of epiphytic plants (plants growing on or hanging from trees without being parasitic). The ground is covered with a deep blanketing of mosses and liverworts, which rise up the trunks of the trees onto the horizontal branches and up into the canopy.

== Biodiversity and taxa ==
=== Flora ===
==== Trees ====
The Celtic Rainforest is dominated by sessile oak (Quercus petraea), downy birch (Betula pubescens) and European ash (Fraxinus excelsior). Other trees include pedunculate oaks, hazel, elm, cherry, and various willows.

==== Lichens ====
Rare lichen communities are found using the mosses as a substrate, and add a wealth of colour to the understory. Lichens of genera Pannaria, Parmeliella, and Degelia add a lead-grey color; lichens of the genus Sticta are very dark; the fruit of jelly lichens (Biatora sphaeroides) are pink; those of Dimerella lutea are bright yellow; and those of dog lichen in the genus Peltigera make chestnut coloured fruits in the shape of shields. The weight of the lichens using mosses as a substrate gradually causes the moss carpeting to peel off the trees, where heaps of rare lichens can be found on the ground. Lungworts are lichens in the genus Lobaria, four species of which can grow up to 30 centimetres or more across.

The more alkaline bark of ash and hazel favour the growth of specklebelly lichens (Pseudocyphellaria spp.). In the grazed birch woodland on higher ground, the bark has a high acidity due to leaching by the high rainfall. This area is dominated by silvery-grey leafy species of lichens that grow directly on the tree bark, not on mosses.

Pyrenula hibernica is restricted to temperate rainforest environments such as the Celtic rainforests and often grows on hazel trees.

=== Fungi ===
Hazel Gloves fungus is endemic in temperate rainforests of Scotland, Wales, Devon and Cornwall.

== Historic human use, conservation, and preservation ==
Historically, these woodlands were coppiced, with the wood being used for charcoal, tanning, and bobbin-making; these practices ended in the mid-1800s. Today, the remaining fragments of Celtic rainforest are protected for conservation and research. Since the 20th century, conservation efforts have resulted in the protection and management of many of these woodlands, to address problems such as invasive Rhododendron, excessive grazing from sheep and deer, and non-native plantation trees.

== See also ==
- List of ecoregions in Europe
- Celtic rainforests in Wales
