= Ballachuan Hazelwood =

Temperate rainforest in Scotland

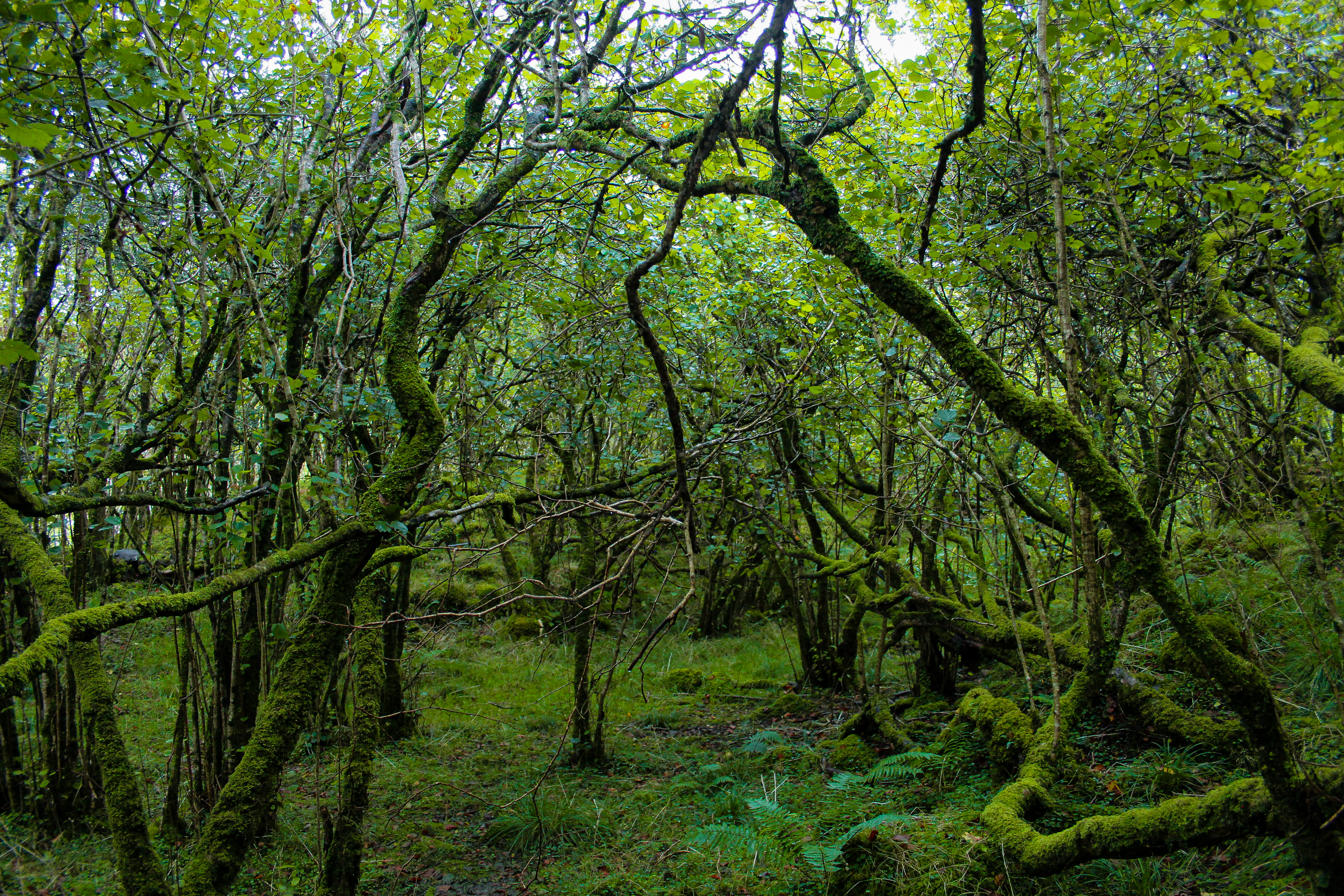
- Interactive map of Ballachuan Hazelwood

Geography
- Location: Seil Island, Scotland
- Coordinates: 56°16′21″N 5°37′3″W
- Area: 121 acres (49 ha)

Administration
- Established: 1985
- Owner: Scottish Wildlife Trust
- Website: scottishwildlifetrust.org.uk/reserve/ballachuan-hazel-wood/

Ecology
- Ecosystems: Atlantic hazelwood, temperate rainforest
- Dominant tree species: Corylus avellana
- Indicator plants: Hazelglove, common hazel, glue fungus, lichens

Ballachuan Hazelwood is an Atlantic hazelwood forest currently managed by the Scottish Wildlife Trust as a nature reserve. It is known as one of the best examples of Scottish temperate rainforest. It provides a habitat for many rare species such as hazel glove fungus which can only live in this extreme oceanic climate. The tree cover is mostly made up of common hazel stands, which are stunted due to the intense windy conditions.

== Location ==
Ballachuan Hazelwood is located on the eastern side of the remote island of Seil next to the small Ballachuan Loch. The closest settlement is named Cuan Ferry, found around a kilometer to the west.

== Flora and fauna ==
=== Flora ===
==== Trees ====
The canopy of the wood is primarily thick hazel stands, although some beech trees can be found in the eastern section. Although hazels are more commonly understory trees in less extreme climates, they dominate this woodland due to their hardiness against wet and windy conditions, as well as their tolerance to thin, rocky soil.

==== Fungi ====
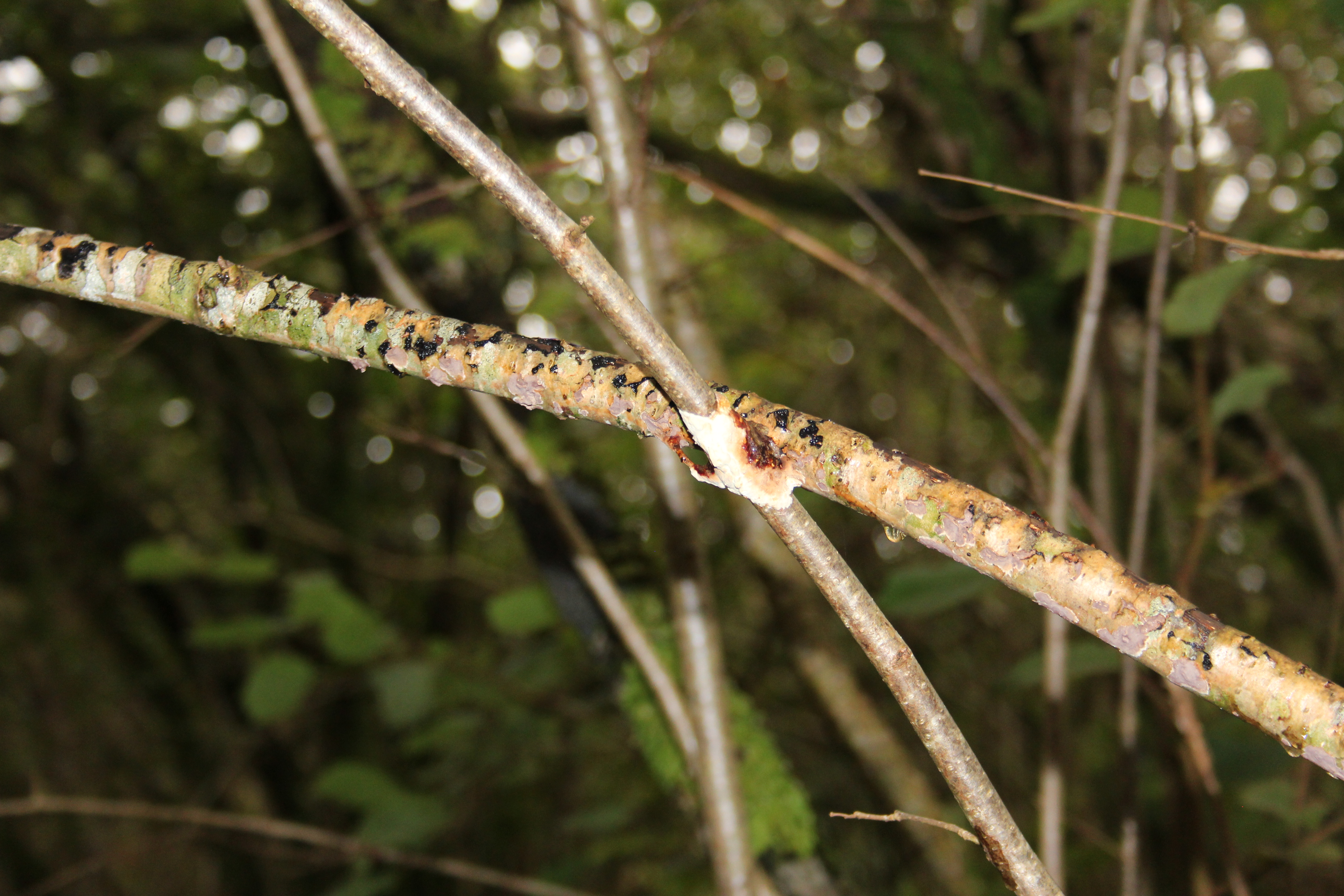
A glue fungus (Hymenochaete corrugata)

Rare fungi such as the glue fungus which catches twigs as they fall and decomposes them are found in the hazelwood. The rare indicator species Hypocreopsis rhododendri (hazel glove) is also found here, making it one of the only locations in Scotland that provides a home for these extremely rare species.

==== Bryophytes ====
Bryophytes live on trees in a non-harmful way, and examples from this reserve include Plagiochila bifaria, Neckera pumila, and Drepanolejeunea hamatifolia. All of these are rare, possibly endangered species that are exclusively found in the hyper-oceanic habitat of this wood.

==== Ferns ====
Ferns dominate the understory in this forest, and the open glade areas are packed with several species, most notably bracken, and in the less open areas, beech ferns (Phegopteris connectilis).

=== Fauna ===
==== Birds ====
A heron nest has been spotted on one of the beech trees. Other birds recorded in the reserve include willow warbler, sedge warbler, chiffchaff, bullfinch, meadow pipit, pied wagtail, wren, song thrush, robin and great tit.

==== Mammals ====
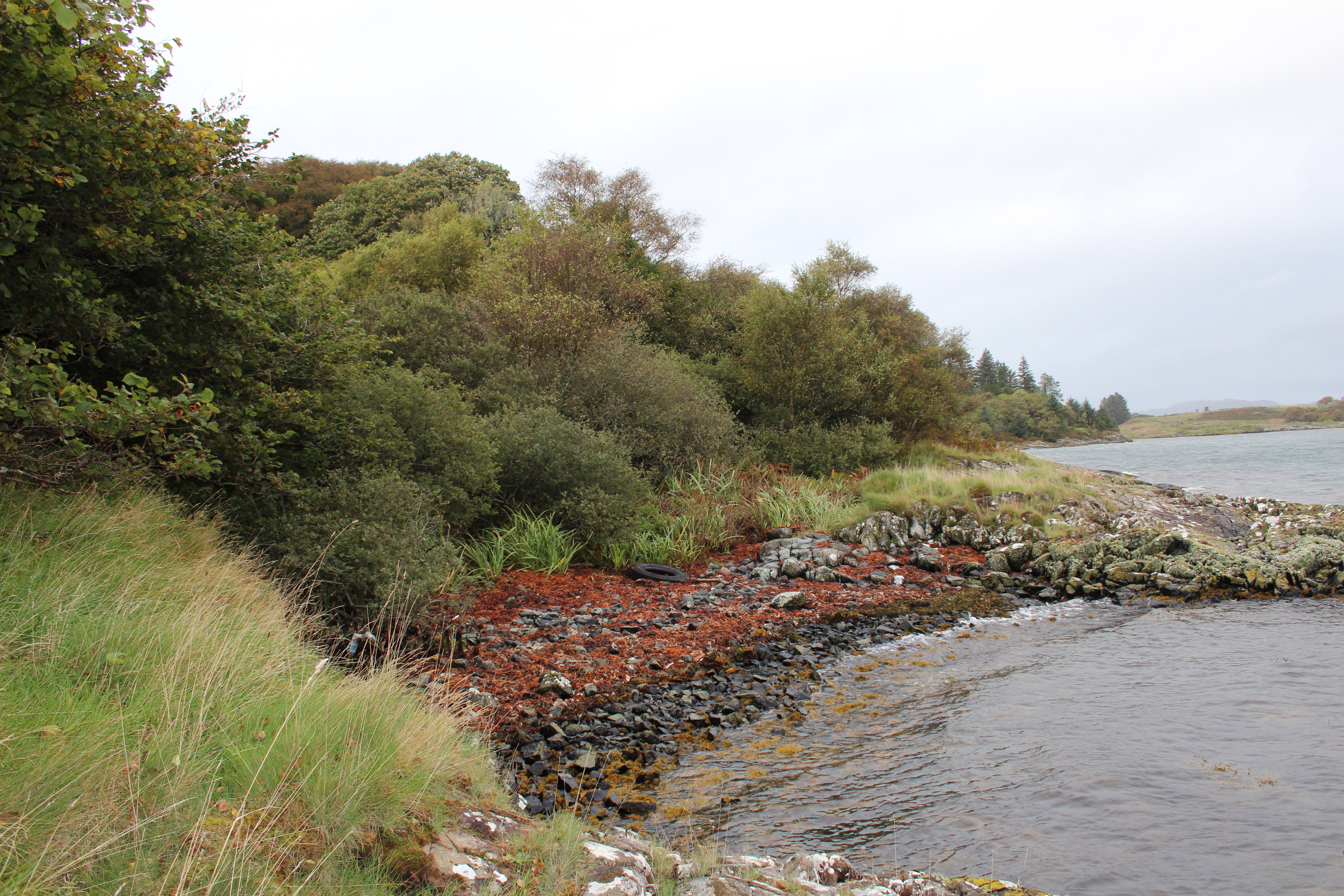
The coast, where otters have been sighted.

Mammals found include roe deer and pine martens in the wood, as well as otters along the shore.

==== Insects ====
In some of the damper, marshland areas of the woods, butterflies are plentiful and species such as common blue, marsh fritillary, and small heath are present. Some beetles as well as other various insects can be found in the more open areas.

==== Amphibians ====
Several species of amphibians have been found in Ballachuan, namely the European toad, as well as newts.

== History ==
Ballachuan Hazelwood is thought to have formed around 7,500 BC, as hazel was one of the first trees to slowly colonize Scotland following the ice age. It has seen little human activity through the years, although around 20 ruined structures have been found around the reserve along with historic farming areas, now completely overgrown with trees.

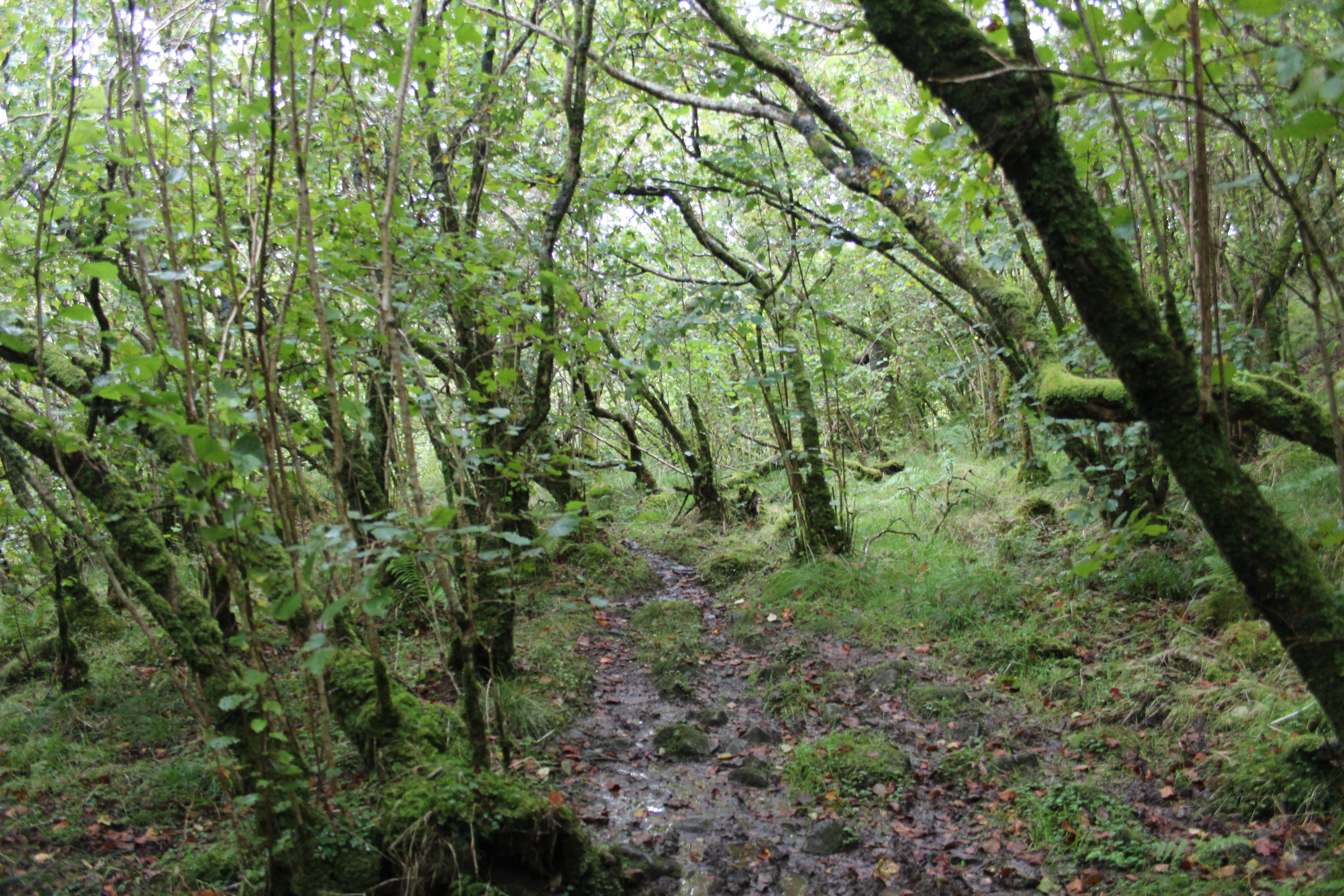
A path going through the reserve.

There is also later activity evidenced by some small mines and quarries as well as several planted beech trees for the amenity of the Breadalbane Estate.

== Conservation ==
Since 1985, the area has been managed by the Scottish Wildlife Trust for conservation. The southern area of the reserve is fenced off with cattle for conservation grazing purposes.

== See also ==
- Atlantic hazelwood
- List of Wildlife Trust nature reserves
- Temperate rainforest
- Ballachuan Loch
