= Atlantic hazelwood =

Hazel dominated temperate rainforest

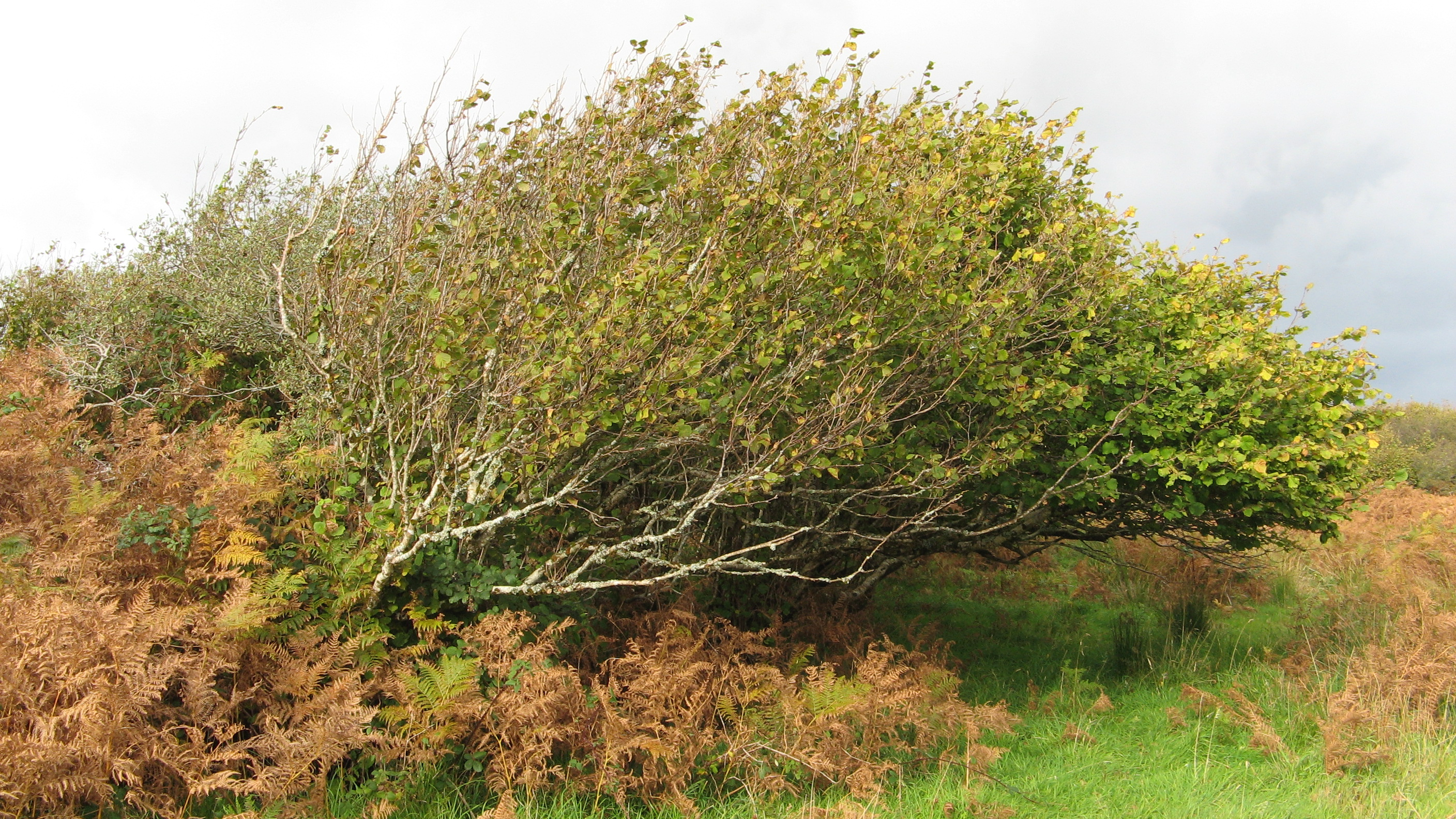
Atlantic hazel stand

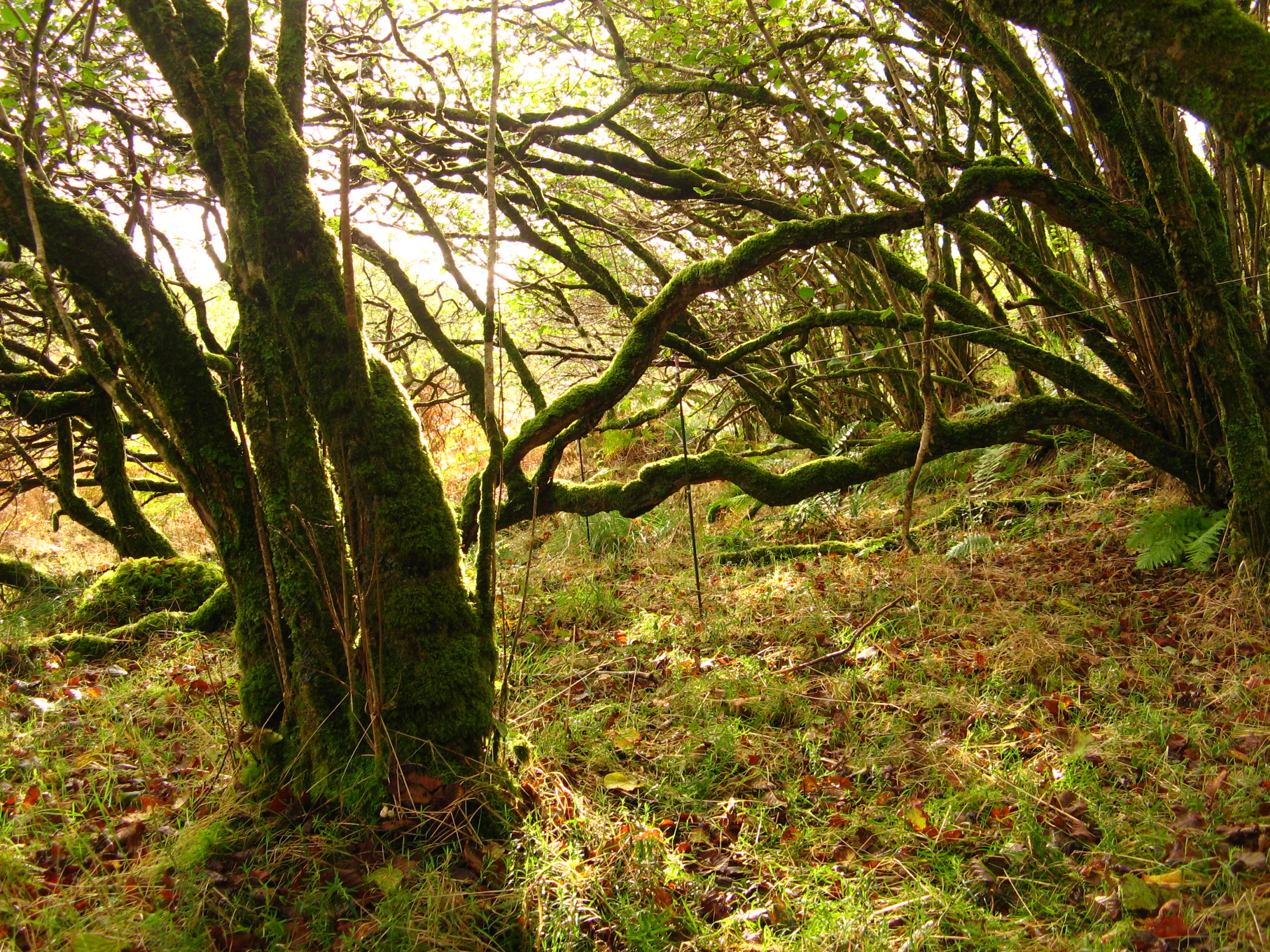
Inside an Atlantic hazelwood

Atlantic hazelwood is hazel (Corylus avellana) dominated temperate rainforest that occurs on the hyperoceanic western fringe of Europe, in particular on the west coasts of Scotland and Ireland. It is considered to be a type of climax scrub. It occurs in exposed, coastal situations where thin soils and strong winds prevent the establishment of trees.

== Historical management ==
Although the Atlantic hazelwoods would historically have been exploited by people, it is thought that the exploitation was limited to seasonal sheltered grazing of livestock and the selective cutting of hazel poles, with clearcut coppicing believed to be a very marginal activity.

== Epiphyte communities ==
The long ecological continuity of the Atlantic hazelwoods due to their lack of clearcut coppicing, together with the hyperoceanic climate under which they occur and low levels of atmospheric pollution, result in luxuriant growth of epiphytic lichens and bryophytes.

Two discrete communities of lichens grow on Atlantic hazel. Young, smooth-barked hazel stems are colonised by crustose lichens of the Graphidion, including the very rare Graphis alboscripta. Pyrenula hibernica is strongly associated with Atlantic hazel. Old, rough-barked stems are colonised by leafy lichens of the Lobarion; a community that is very rare and declining in Europe.

Atlantic hazelwood is also the habitat of the rare fungus hazel gloves (Hypocreopsis rhododendri).

== Distribution ==
It is found exclusively along the west coasts of Scotland, Ireland, and some other western coastal areas of the rest of Europe. Old-growth Atlantic hazelwood rainforest is globally rare and considered unique to the British Isles. The most extensive and notable location is The Burren in Ireland, although the most famous is Ballachuan Hazelwood, a Scottish Wildlife Trust reserve and one of the best examples of this habitat.
