= Pistyll Cain =

Waterfall in Merionethshire, Wales

Coordinates: 52.8303°N 3.8809°W

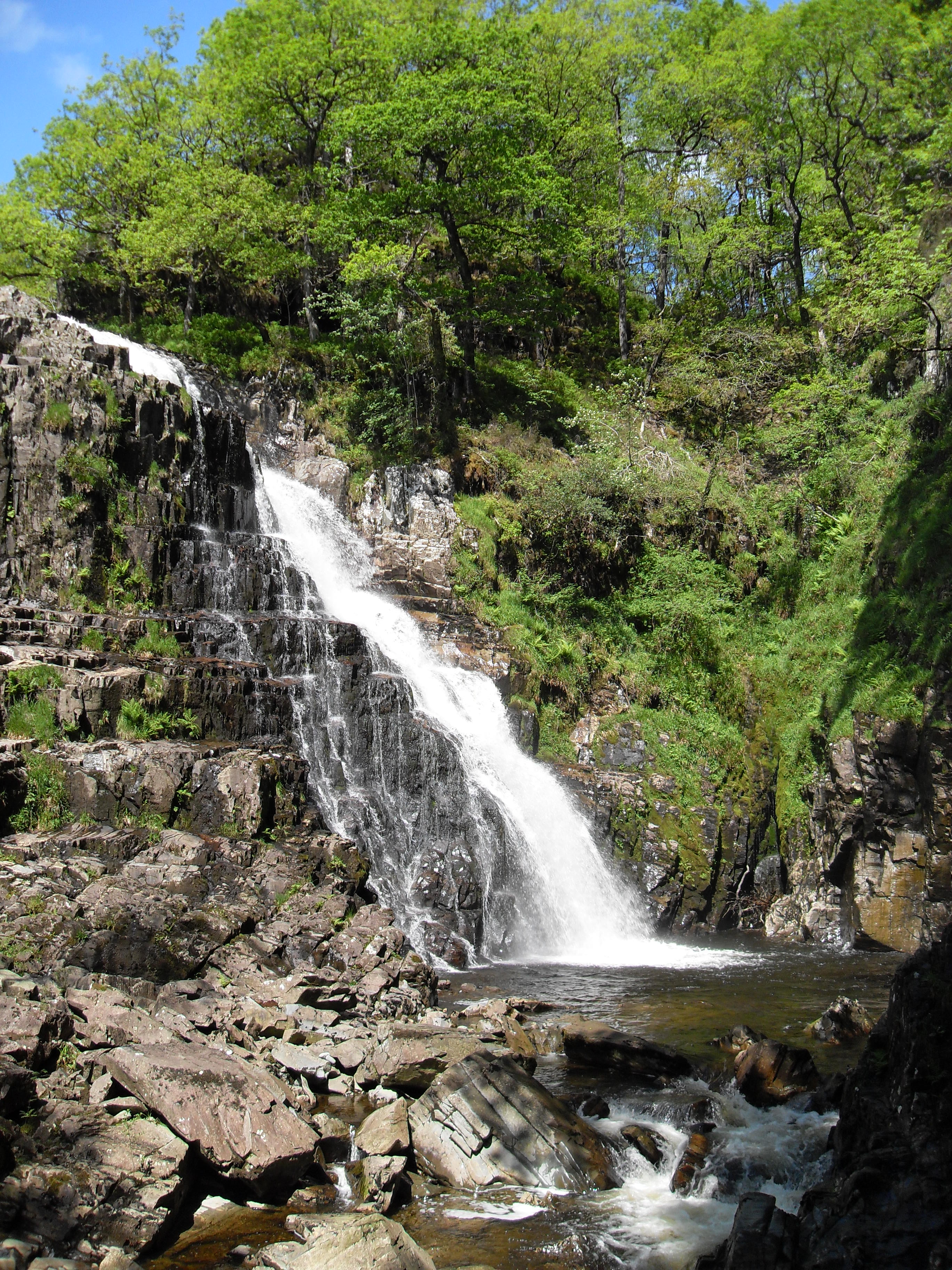
Photograph of Pistyll Cain

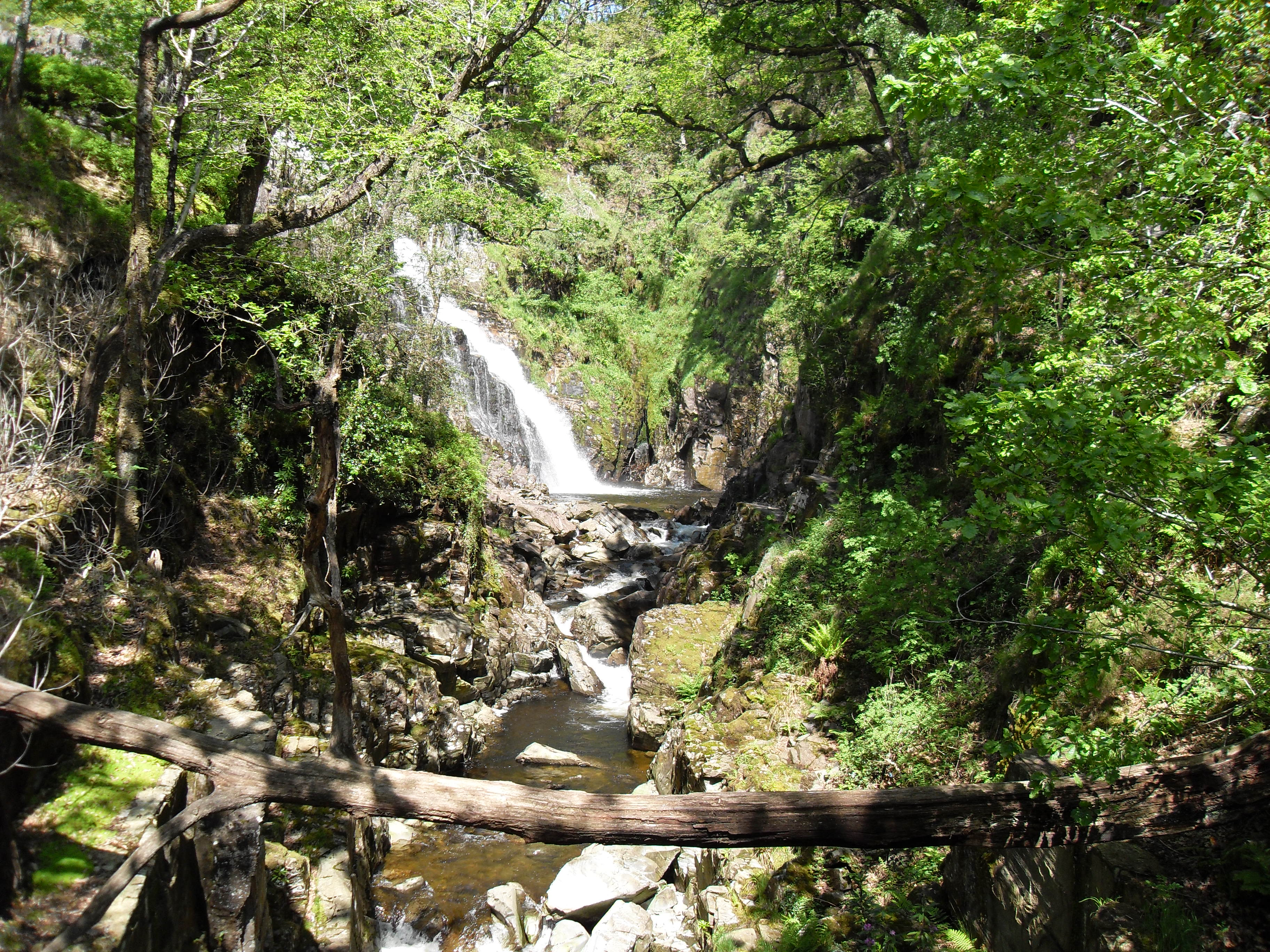

Pistyll Cain, also written as Pistill Cain and Pistill Y Caen, is a renowned waterfall in Meirionnydd (Sir Feirionnydd) in north Wales. It lies north-east of Ganllwyd off the A470 trunk road between Dolgellau and Trawsfynydd.

== 19th century prints ==
Prints made from engravings based on various artists' drawings were made of the falls in the first half of the 19th century during the Romantic period.

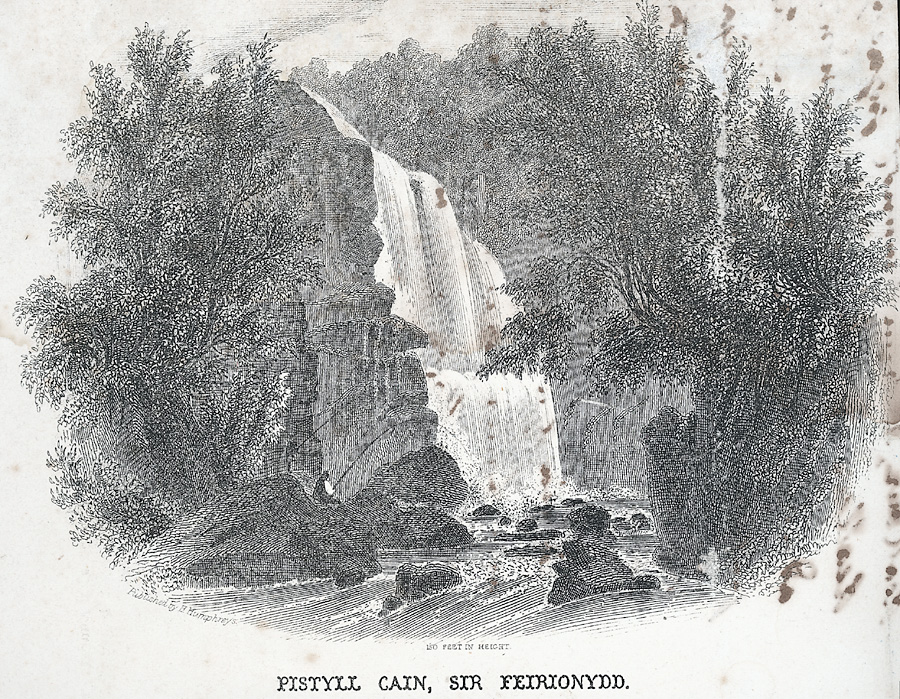

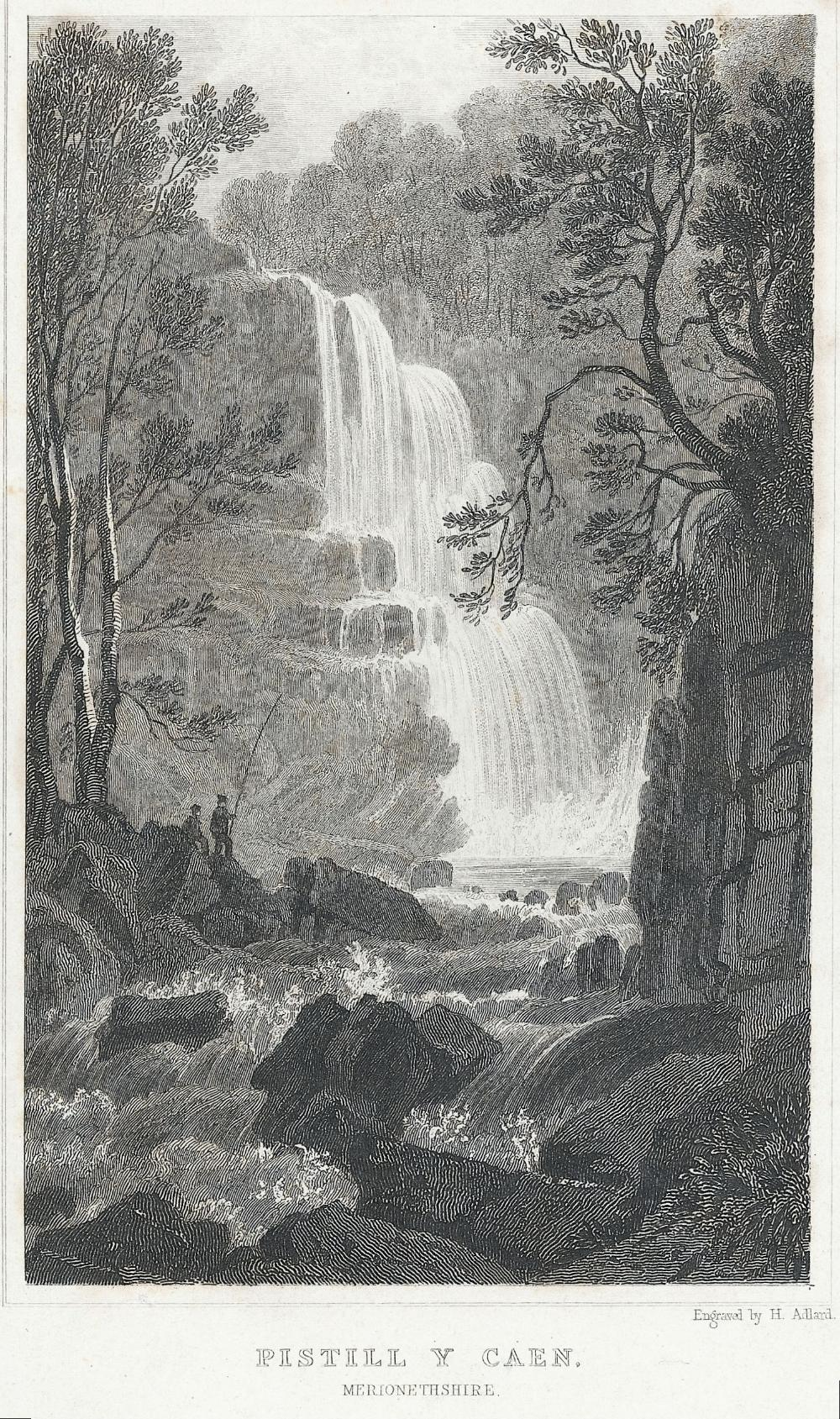

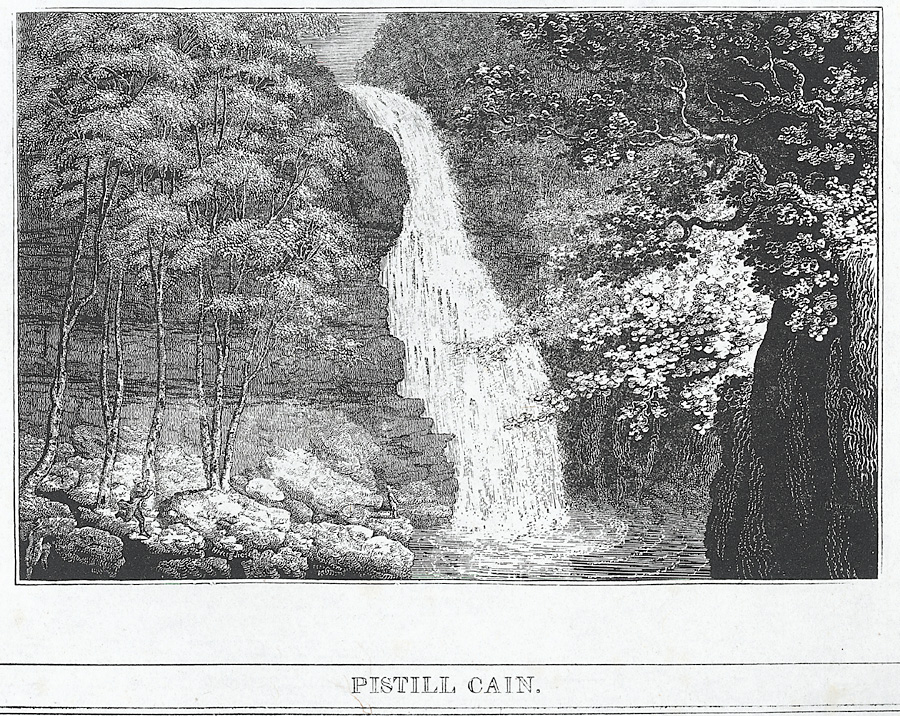

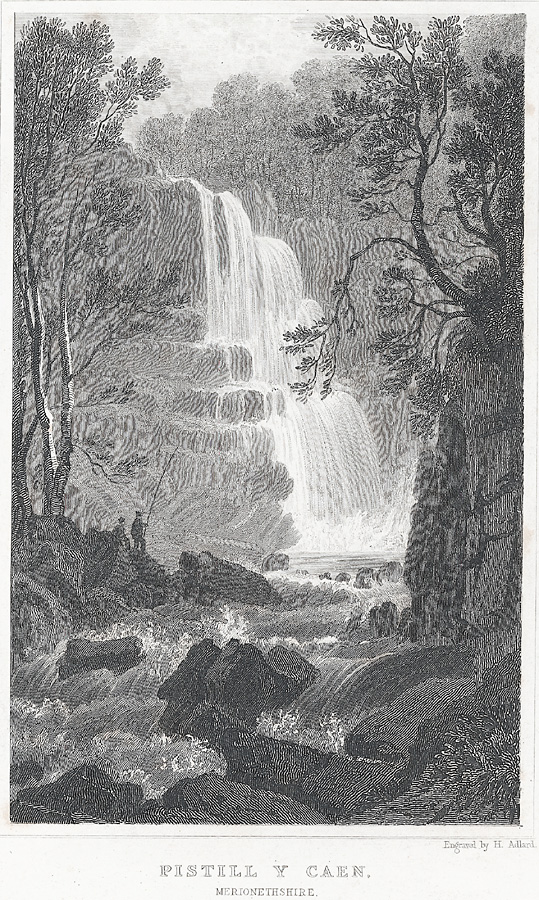

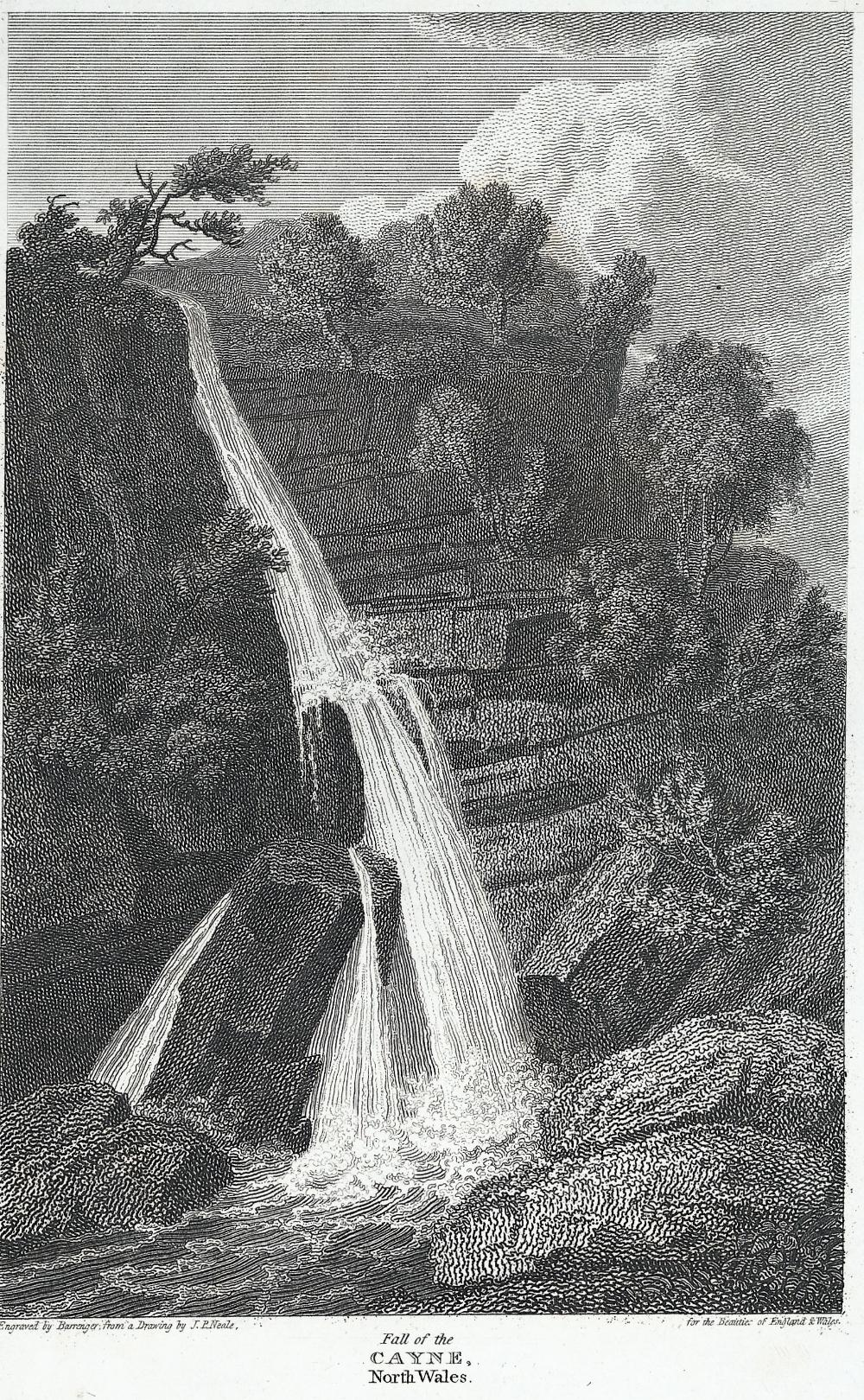
