= Llyn Trawsfynydd =

Reservoir in Wales

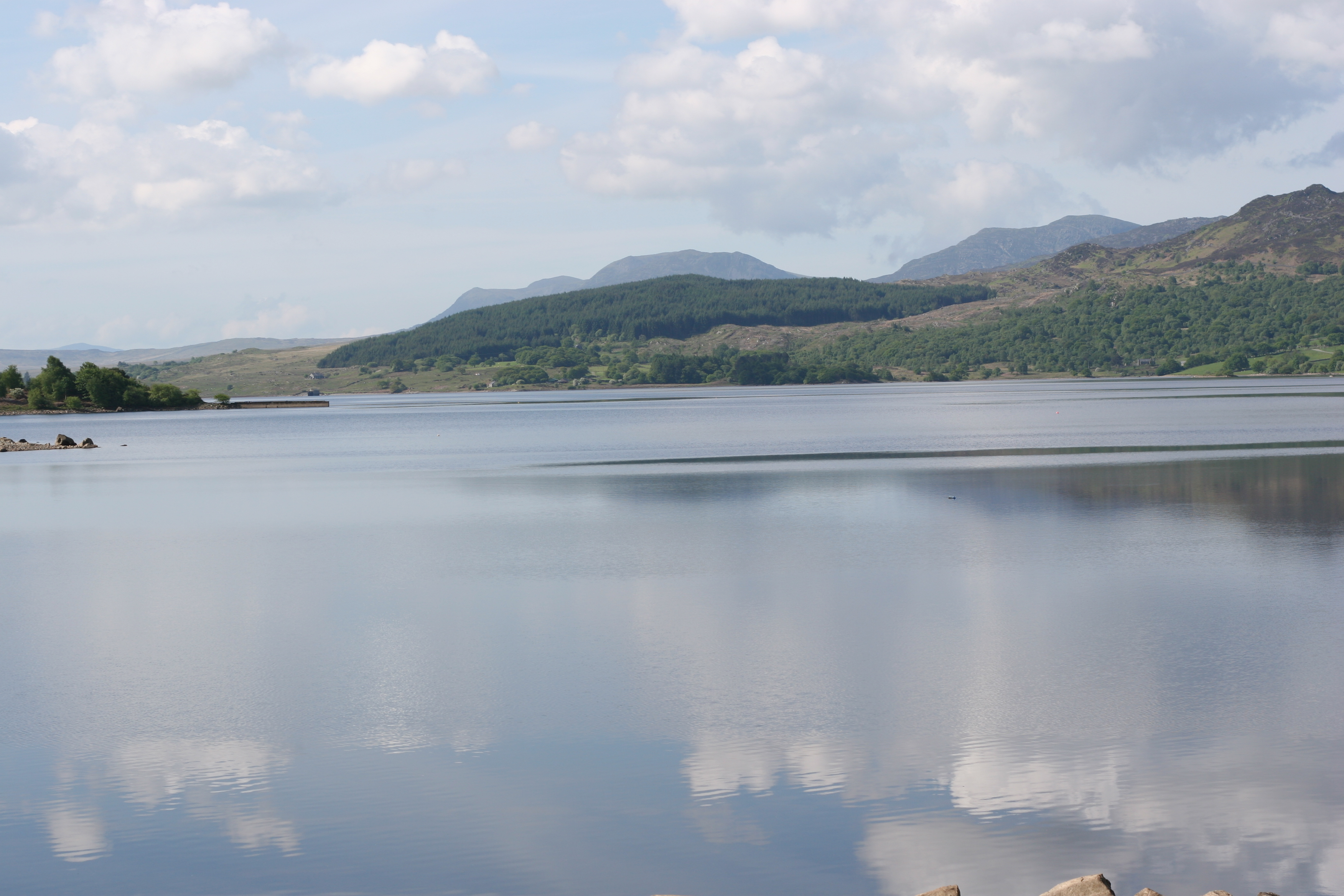
- Looking south

- Location within Gwynedd
- Location: Gwynedd, North Wales
- Coordinates: 52°54′40″N 3°56′40″W
- Type: reservoir
- Primary outflows: Afon Prysor
- Built: 1928
- Max. length: 4.39 km (2.73 mi)
- Max. width: 2.3 km (1.4 mi)
- Surface area: 4.8 km^{2} (1.9 sq mi)
- Average depth: 4 m (13 ft)
- Water volume: 40,390,000 m^{3} (1.426×10^{9} cu ft)

Llyn Trawsfynydd is a large artificial reservoir situated near the village of Trawsfynydd in Gwynedd, North Wales. With a total surface area of 4.8 km^{2} (1,200 acres) the reservoir is slightly more extensive than Wales's largest natural lake, Llyn Tegid (Bala Lake) at 4.5 km^{2} (1,100 acres).

== History ==
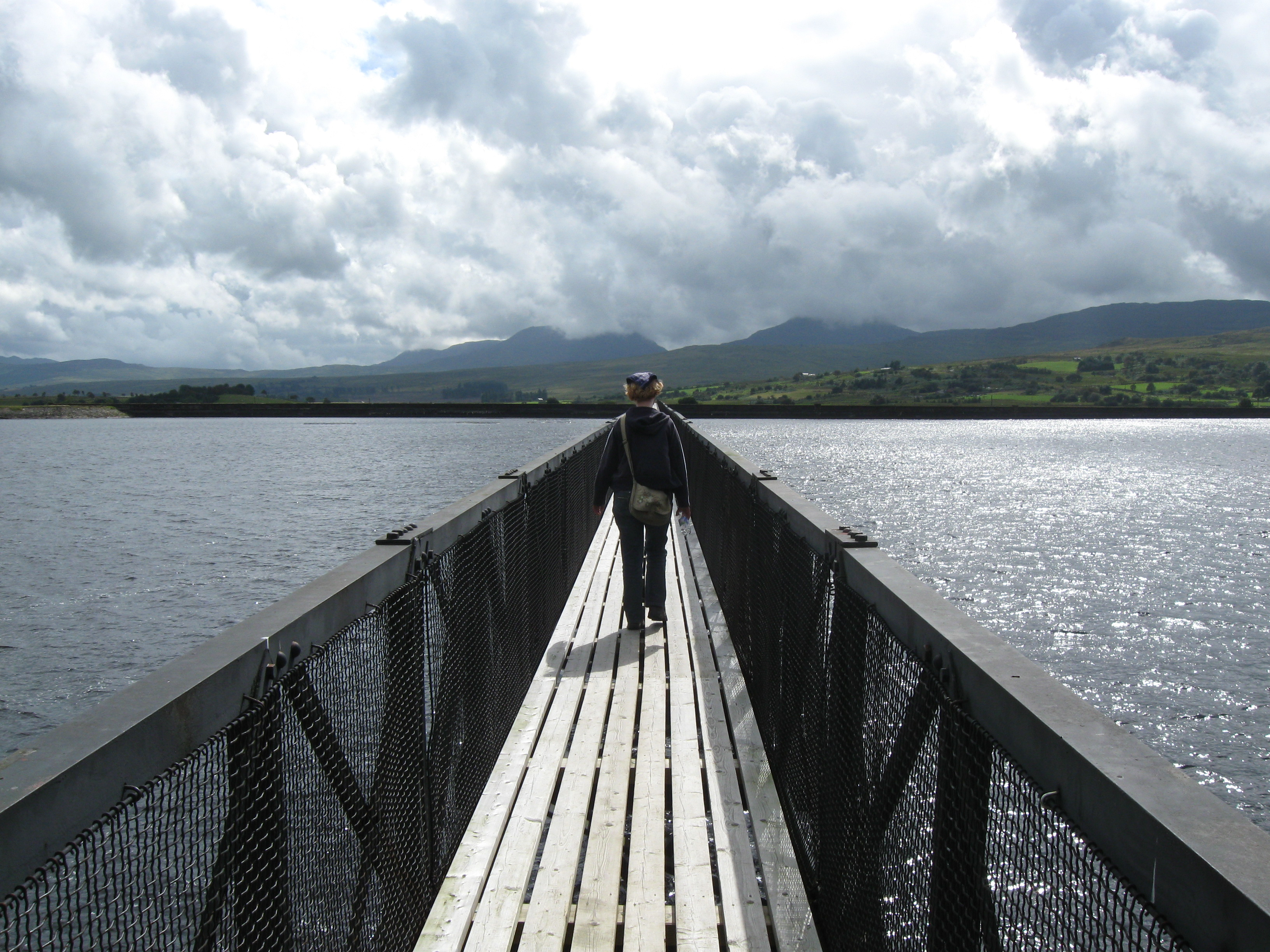
Llyn Trawsfynydd footbridge

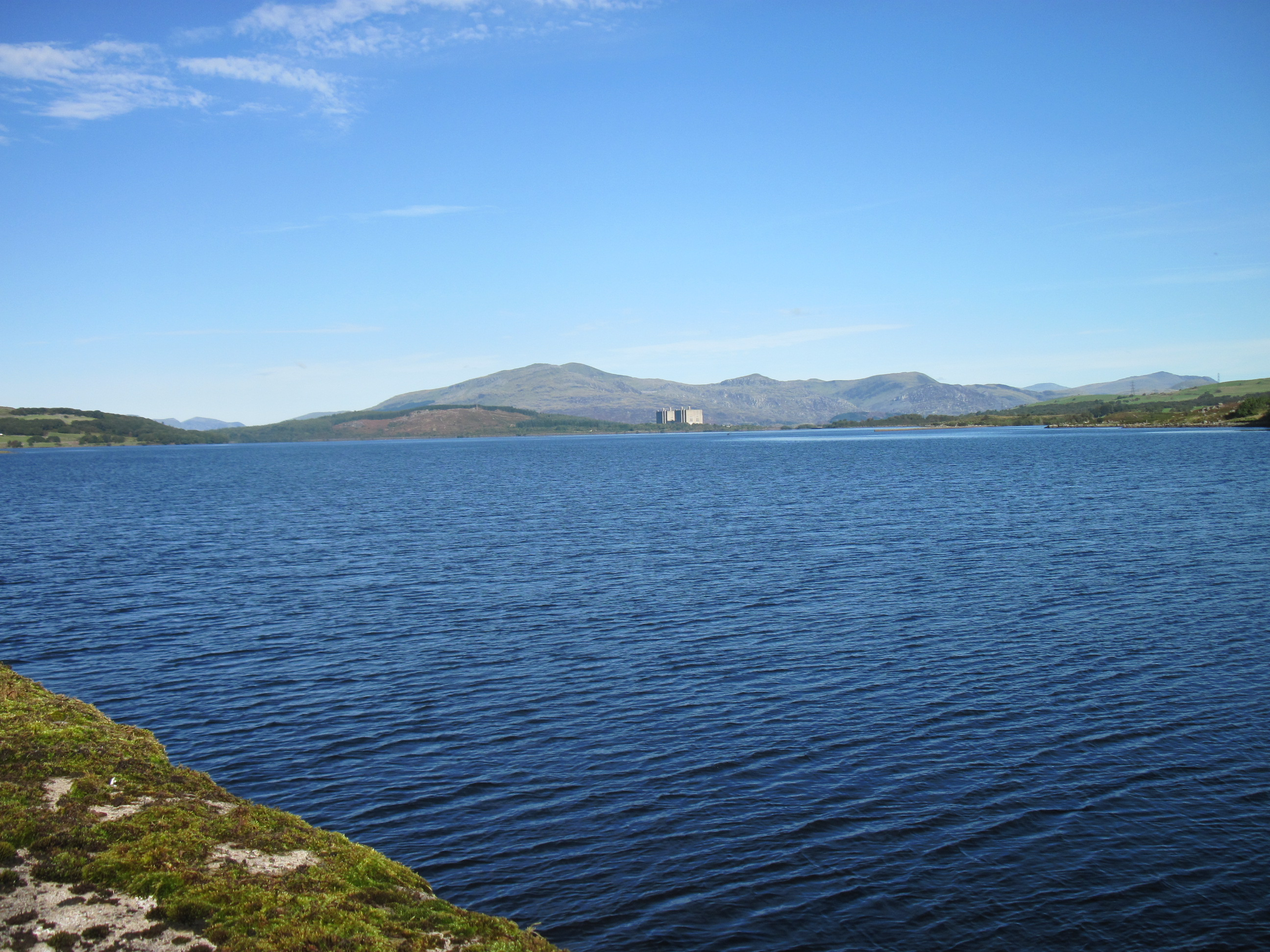
Looking north to the power station

The lake was created between 1924 and 1928 by building four dams in order to supply water for Maentwrog power station.

More than twenty properties, some of historical significance, were lost in the creation of the lake but there was little local objection at the time. Included were at least two farms, Brynhir and Llwynderw. Indeed, the power station was regarded as a good thing because it could supply the whole of North Wales' electricity needs. However local landowners and farmers did object to the loss of rights of way across their former lands. In order to avoid long detours round the new lake, a small road was built along the western shore and a footbridge was erected across the narrowest part of the lake.

In 1965 the lake became the source of cooling water for the Trawsfynydd nuclear power station which began generating electricity for the UK National Grid. To increase the volume of water in the lake, one of the lake's dams had been rebuilt in the early 1960s. This was because of priority over usage. Previously the Maentwrog power station had taken all of the water in the lake, but the needs of the nuclear plant dictated that the hydro plant would only be able to use the top 5 ft (1.5 m) of water.

In 1991 the nuclear power station was shut down and decommissioning began. It will not be completed until 2083.

Since the plant's closure, the lake has cooled to natural levels allowing fauna and flora to regenerate. Water continues to be used for hydroelectricity generation.
