= Coed Ganllwyd National Nature Reserve =

Nature reserve in Wales

Coordinates: 52.800°N 3.909°W

Coed Ganllwyd National Nature Reserve is situated behind the village of Ganllwyd on the A470, about 9 kilometres north of Dolgellau in Wales, United Kingdom. It lies within the boundaries of the National Trust's Dolmelynllyn Estate.

An island of broadleaved deciduous trees amidst a sea of conifer plantations, it includes a steep wooded gorge and high tumbling waterfalls. Along this ravine is the famous ‘Rhaeadr Ddu’ which translates as ‘black waterfall’.

In addition to being considered the richest site in Western Europe for mosses and liverworts, it is also an important home for certain rare species of bats, like the lesser horseshoe bat.
