= Ballachuan Loch =

Small loch on Seil Island, Scotland

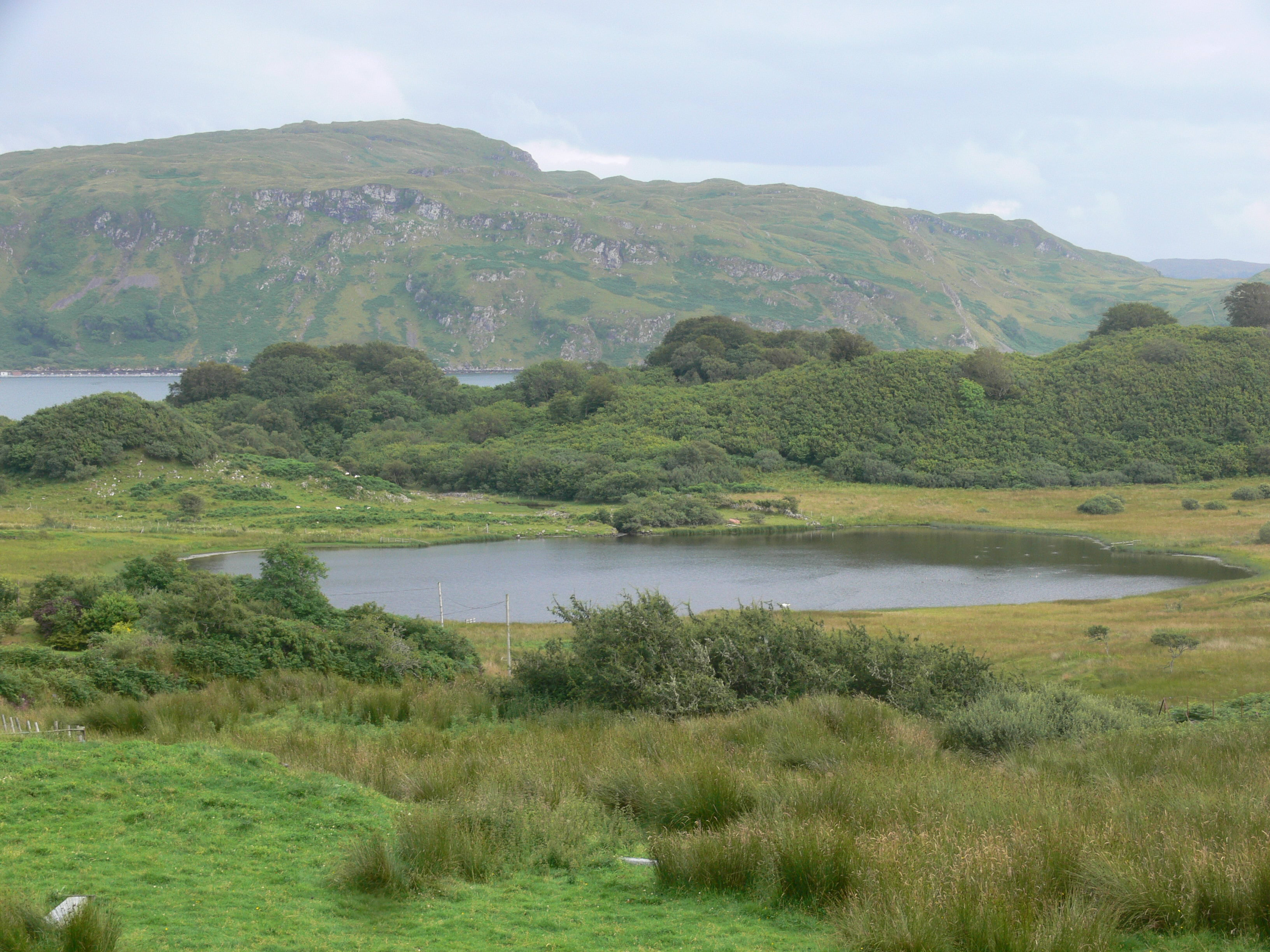
- A view of the loch from a nearby field - Ballachuan Hazelwood can be seen in the background.
- Location: Seil Island, Scotland
- Coordinates: 56°16′38″N 5°37′05″W
- Type: Loch

Location
- Interactive map of Ballachuan Loch

Ballachuan Loch is a small loch located on the island of Seil, Scotland. Part of the loch is located within the nature reserve of Ballachuan Hazelwood, meaning that the loch is rich with wildlife.

== Description ==
Being located on the remote island of Seil, Ballachuan Loch is encompassed by a small marshland. The eastern shore of the loch is part of the Scottish Wildlife Trust Reserve of Ballachuan Hazelwood.

Most of the surrounding area is pasture or land used for other forms of agriculture although within the nature reserve a dense forest can be found.

== History ==
Over the years, Ballachuan Loch has seen minimal use, although in the nearby land several structures and quarries have been located, indicating past use of the loch and nearby reserve.

== See also ==
- Ballachuan Hazelwood
- Seil (island)
- List of lochs in Scotland
