= Dolmelynllyn Estate =

National Trust property in Gwynedd, Wales

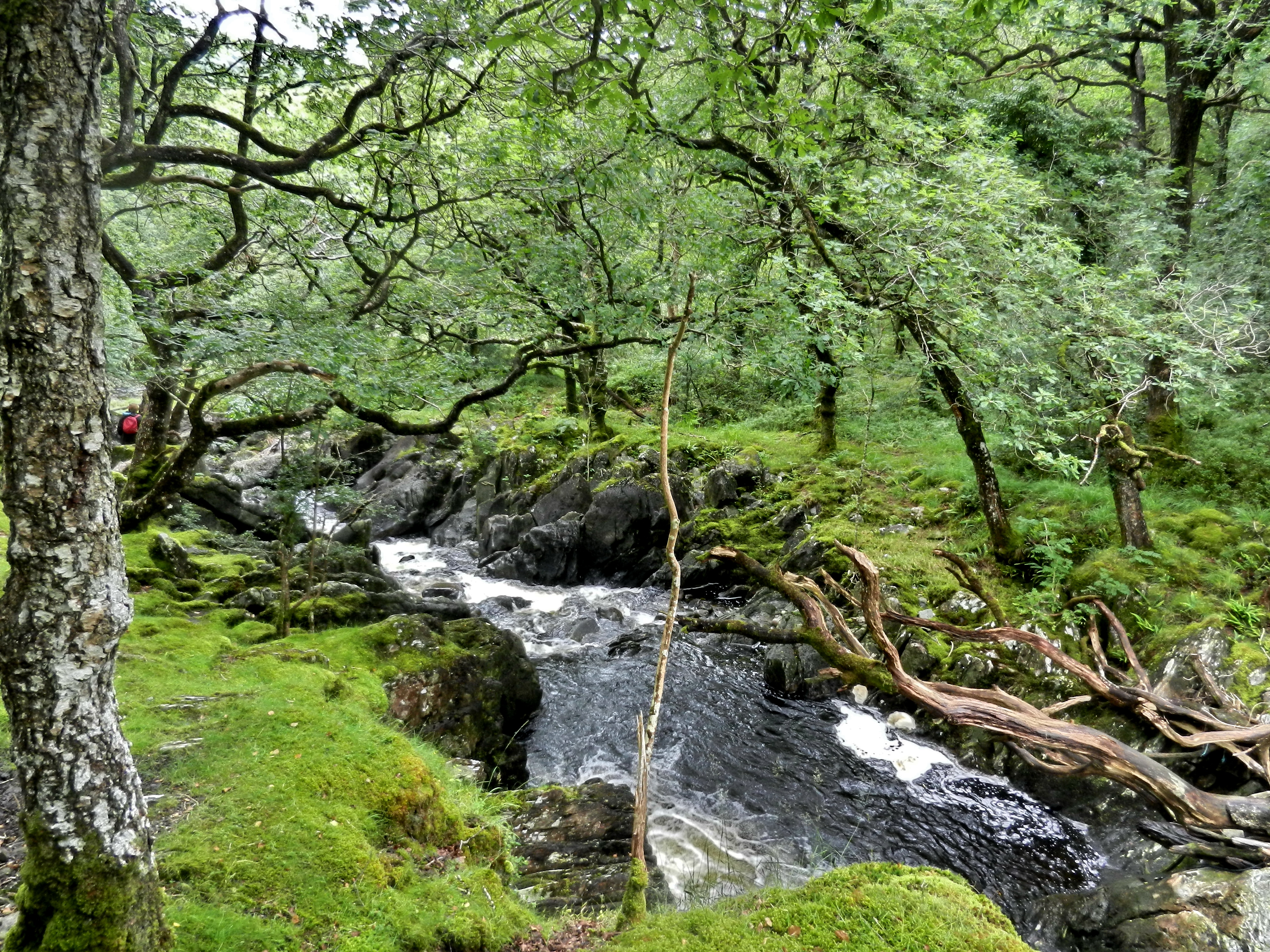
- Waterfalls on estate
- Interactive map of Dolmelynllyn Estate
- Location: Gwynedd
- Coordinates: 52°48′06″N 03°53′24″W
- Area: 500 hectares (1,200 acres)
- Opened: 1936
- Owner: National Trust
- Website: www.nationaltrust.org.uk/trails/-dolmelynllyn-estate-walk

Dolmelynllyn Estate is an area of farmland, woodland and parkland near the village of Ganllwyd in southern Gwynedd, Wales. It is owned by the National Trust. The estate was formerly owned by William Madocks, the architect of Porthmadog. Features of the estate include ancient woodland, temperate rainforest, rare lichens and mosses, as well as archaeological features from prehistoric cists to nineteenth-century gold mines. The estate also has 46 bee boles on it, which is the highest concentration in the United Kingdom.

== Location ==
The Dolmelynllyn Estate is approximately 5 miles (8.0 km) north of Dolgellau, Gwynedd, in the southern area of the Snowdonia National Park. It is over 500 hectares (1,200 acres) in extent and includes landscapes that vary from river terraces to high moorland, as well as boulder-strewn woodland. The highest point on the estate is at 500 metres (1,600 ft), just above Bryn Bedwog. The estate sits within and alongside the village of Ganllwyd.

Its geology is predominately Middle-Upper Cambrian strata, but also includes Barmouth grit and Gamlan flags, as well as Cefn Coch grit.

== History ==
Griffith Vaughan (died c. 1700), the fourth son of the antiquary Robert Vaughan, settled at the estate in the late seventeenth century. His great-grandson, also Robert Vaughan, sold it approximately a century later.

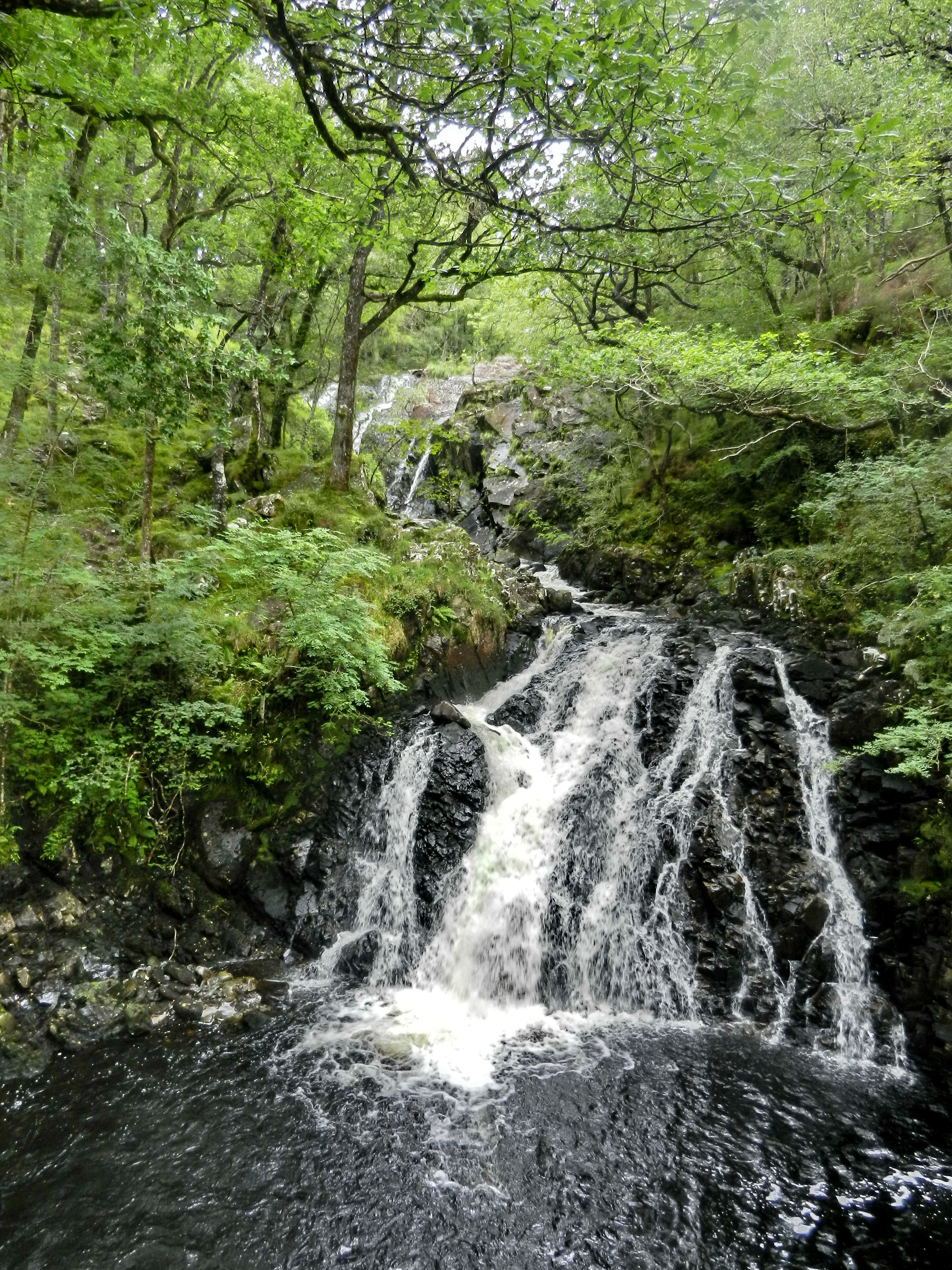
Ganllwyd NNR – waterfall

In 1796 William Alexander Madocks purchased the estate, using inheritance from the death of his father. He paid £1550 for the farm and £950 for the timber and underwood. He created a ferme ornée (ornamental farm) there, where he entertained friends such as Thomas Love Peacock. He was attracted to the location due to its proximity to the waterfalls of Rhaeadr Ddu, Pistyll Cain and Rhaeadr Mawddach. One of Madocks's building schemes included building paths to enable improved access to Rhaeadr Ddu. He also built a privy in the shape of "an old broken tower". However, despite making many changes, Madocks only lived there intermittently, for perhaps four years. By c.1810 he had mortgaged the estate to a group of investors. Despite his entrepreneurial schemes, Madocks died in 1828 owing money to a wide variety of creditors.

The estate appears to have been part of a complex set of financial arrangements in the intervening decades after Madocks's death, with a timber merchant called Robert Roberts holding the tenancy for some, if not all of the period.

In 1850 the estate was purchased by Charles Reynolds Williams, who made extensive alterations to the landscape that are still present, including the addition of a formal lake, new driveways, formal gardens and a kitchen garden. He passed the estate on to his son, Romer Williams, in 1892.

In 1903, Romer Williams sold the estate, moving to Newnham Hall in Northamptonshire. The purchaser was Alexander Campbell Blair of Bronmeillion in Llandudno, who bought it for £11,850. Campbell Blair left the estate to the National Trust as a legacy in his will when he died in 1936. As of 1992, the Trust had purchased two further parcels of land to add to the estate: the upland fringe of Maes Mawr, which had previously belonged to the Vaughans and another more northerly piece of land.

== Conservation ==
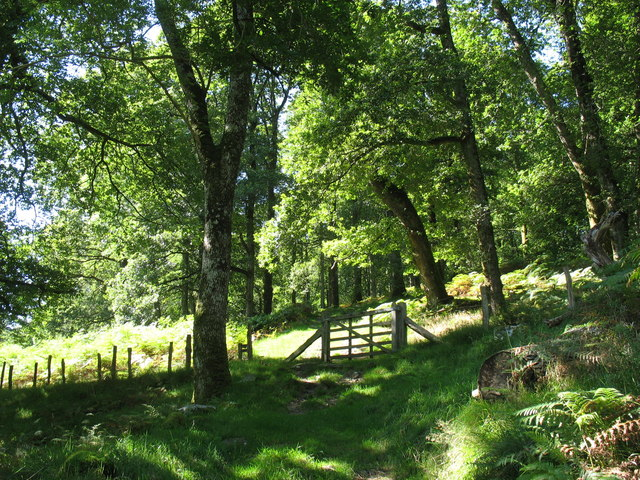
Coed Dolmelynllyn woodlands

Dolmelynllyn Estate's woodlands include rare temperate rainforest and ancient woodland. The Coed Ganllwyd National Nature Reserve (NNR) lies within the estate and covers 183.77 hectares. Within, and also extending beyond the boundaries of the estate, are several significant areas, including: the Meirionnydd Oakwoods and Bat Sites are Important Plant Areas and Special Areas of Conservation; the Ganllwyd Sites of Special Scientific Interest. The woodlands are notable for their wide variety of rare bryophytes and lichens, including the genus Lobaria, in particular Lobaria pulmonaria. The estate also has a population of the epiphytic lichen, Agonimia octospora, which rarely occurs outside the New Forest.

The estate has successfully used conservation grazing by Highland cattle to restore and manage the woodland. Its woods supplied green oak to support the conservation of Egryn, a medieval farmhouse also owned by the Trust.

The Welsh National Sheepdog Trials took place on the estate in 2018. In 2019 pine martens were recorded on the estate for the first time; they were lured there from territories nearby with jam and eggs. In 2021 The Guardian named the estate as one of the United Kingdom's top ten places for a spring walk.

== Buildings and structures ==
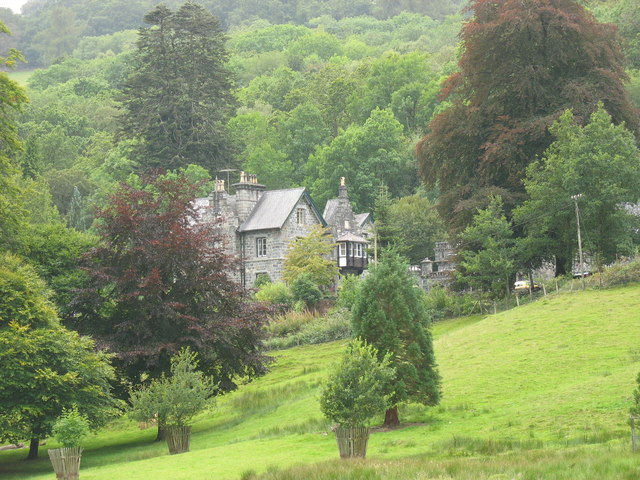
The former Plas Dolmelynllyn Hotel

Dolmelynllyn Hall is the former centre of the estate and was run as a hotel, until it closed for refurbishments. (Note: The hotel closed for refurbishments in 2022.) It is a Grade II listed building, that was expanded by Charles Williams during the nineteenth century, around an earlier core, probably designed by his brother, George Williams of Liverpool. The earliest part of the building dates to the late sixteenth or early seventeenth century. Its Tudor-effect half-timbering was added after 1890. One former name is the Oakley Arms. North Lodge stands at the driveway to the hall; it is now a farmhouse.

The estate is home to the highest concentration of bee boles in Wales. A bee bole is a cavity in a wall, built to hold a skep. There are 46 boles, built in the nineteenth century, likely by the owner of the estate Charles Williams.

The estate also includes Nant Las – a nineteenth-century observatory rented out by the National Trust as a holiday cottage. The estate also included a water-powered corn mill, potentially built by the Vaughan family, which was later converted to a sawmill and turning-mill. As a turning-mill it mainly produced broom handles.

There are several ruined farms across the estate, the oldest of which is likely to be Berth-Lwyd. The gardens and park are designated Grade II on the Cadw/ICOMOS Register of Parks and Gardens of Special Historic Interest in Wales.

== Archaeology ==
Eighteen sites of potential prehistoric date occur at scattered locations across the estate. They include a wide range of monument types: hut circles, cairns, cists, enclosures, platforms and a possible chambered tomb are all represented. There are two cairnfields on the estate: one near Berth-Lwyd, which also includes an enclosure; the other near Hafod y Fedw, a former farm. The Bronze Age cairn and cist at Cefn Coch are a scheduled monument.

Medieval and post-medieval landscapes are represented by an estate-wide mosaic of remains which are associated with the past agricultural landscape. Monuments include walls, sheepfolds, enclosures, platforms and the remains of buildings.

== Gold mining ==
The estate includes the remains of the gold-mining industry. The first mine to open was at Berth-Lwyd in 1860. Joseph Mosheimer, an American prospector who had worked in the Californian gold fields, was commissioned by the Welsh Gold Mining Company to establish the mill and mines there. A tramway to the workings was established in 1864. It had ceased production by 1866, having processed 648 troy ounces of gold.

A mine was then reopened further up the hillside at Cefn Coch, following the same lode. The remains of the mill are ruins, but visitors to the estate are able to reach them; they include two water-wheel pits. At the edge of one of the pits is a grinding device, unique to Welsh gold-mining, known as an "edge-runner". A reservoir was built at the site. In addition to these sites, there are also other traces of trial adits across the estate.

Copper was also mined on the estate from 1861 to 1865 and again from 1891 to 1895.

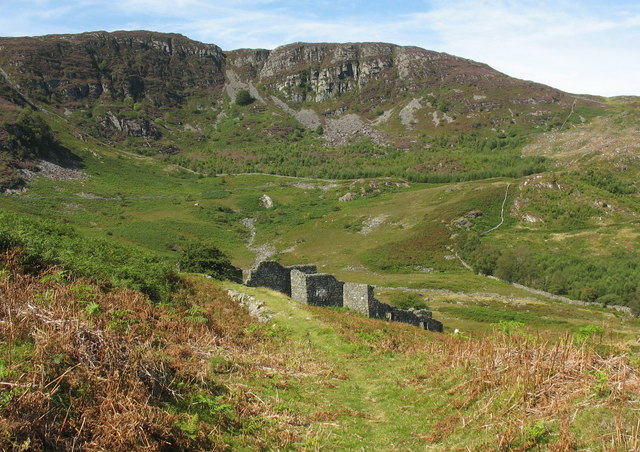
Approaching Cefn Coch ruins

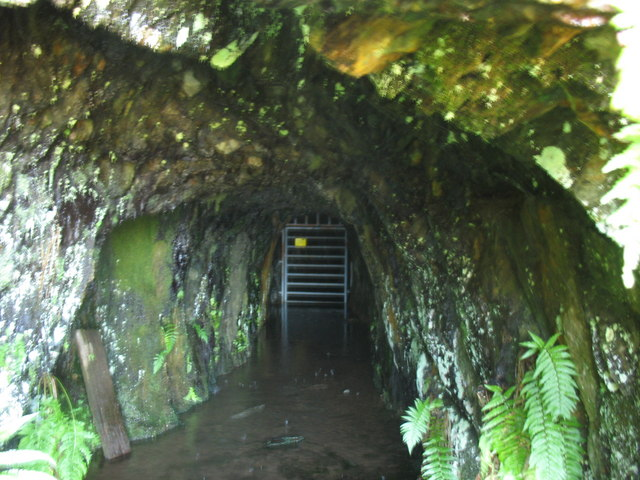
Closed-off mineshaft at Cefn Coch

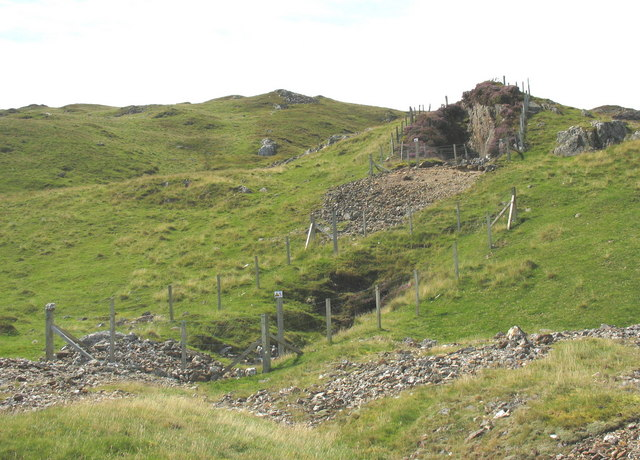
Adit and rise in the upper section of Cefn Coch mine

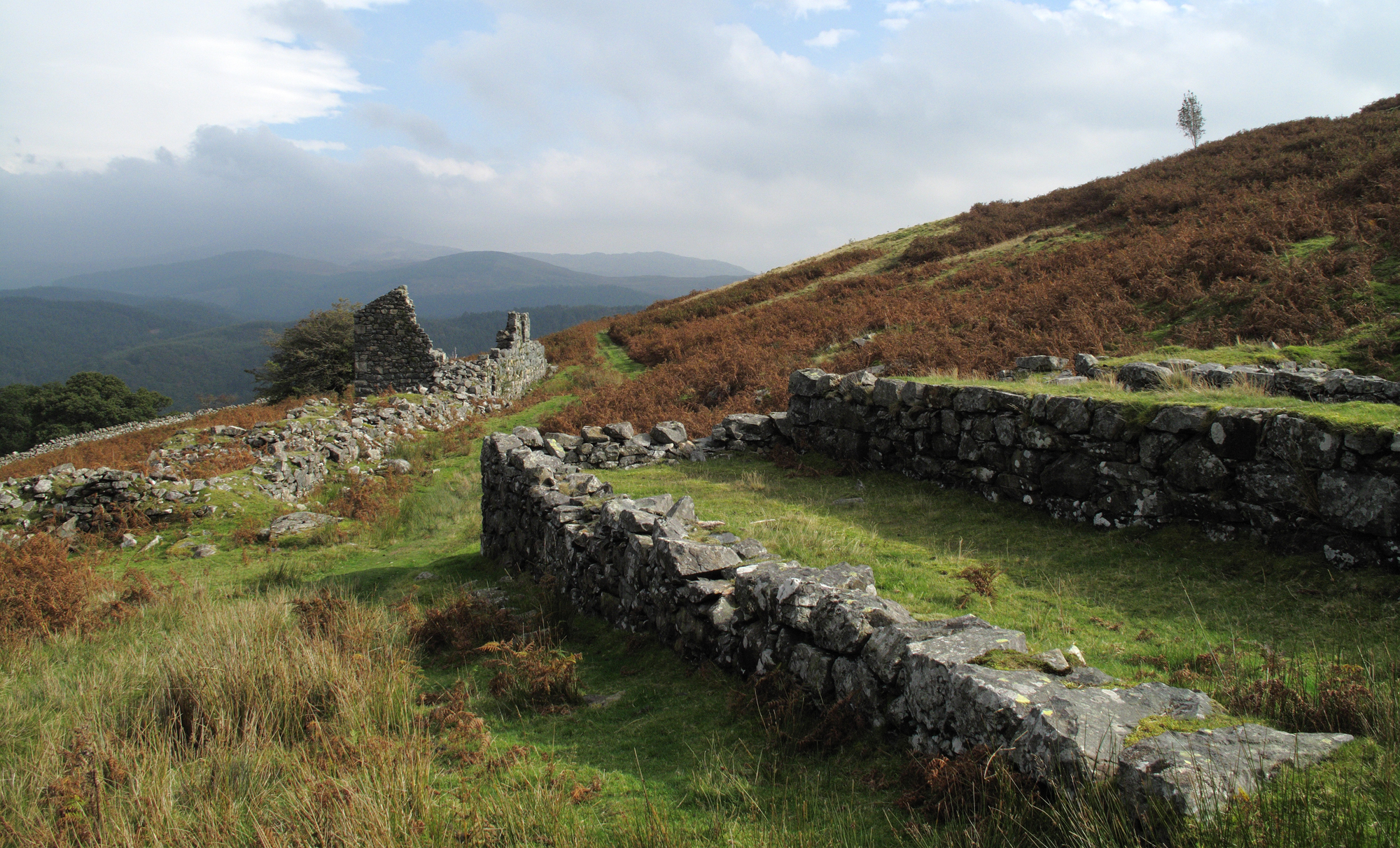
Ruined buildings at Cefn Coch

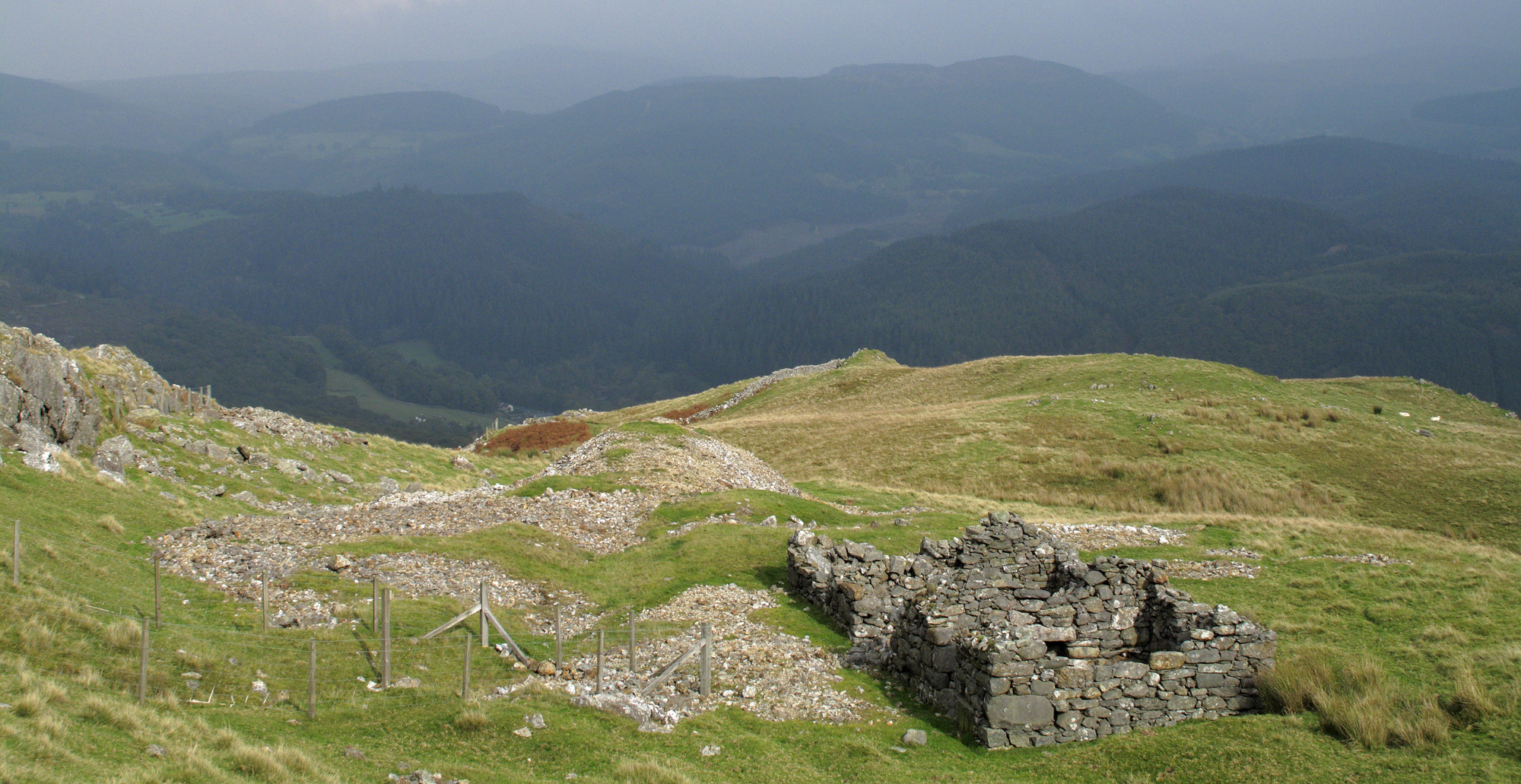
Ruined building at Cefn Coch
