= Important Plant Areas =

Programme set up in the UK by the organisation Plantlife

Important Plant Areas (IPA) is a programme set up in the UK, by the organisation Plantlife, to provide a framework for identifying and maintaining the richest sites for plant life, possibly within existing protected areas; though the protection of the IPA itself is not legally enforced. The term plant life in this case refers to any number of species, encompassing algae, fungi, lichens, liverworts, mosses, and wild vascular plants. IPAs are selected with the intention of focusing on the conservation of the important wild plant populations in these areas, and act as a subset in the broader context of Key Biodiversity Areas. Designating an IPA is intended to gain awareness and encourage long-term conservation through an 'ecosystem-based' approach.

The identification of IPAs is based on three criteria:

A. Presence of threatened plant species: the site holds significant populations of one or more species that are of global or regional conservation concern
B. Presence of botanical richness: the site has an exceptionally rich flora in a regional context in relation to its biogeographic zone
C. Presence of threatened habitats: the site is an outstanding example of a habitat or vegetation type of global or regional plant conservation and botanical importance

IPAs are integral to the initiatives of government agencies and NGOs in furthering the development of conservation goals on a national and international level. Plantlife's international team has had some success in spreading the concept abroad.

Areas include:

- Dolmelynllyn Estate, Gwynedd

== See also ==
- Important Bird Areas
- Ecology
- Wilderness
- Biodiversity
- Protected Areas
- International Union for Conservation of Nature
- Ecoregions
- Key Biodiversity Areas
- Biodiversity hotspot
