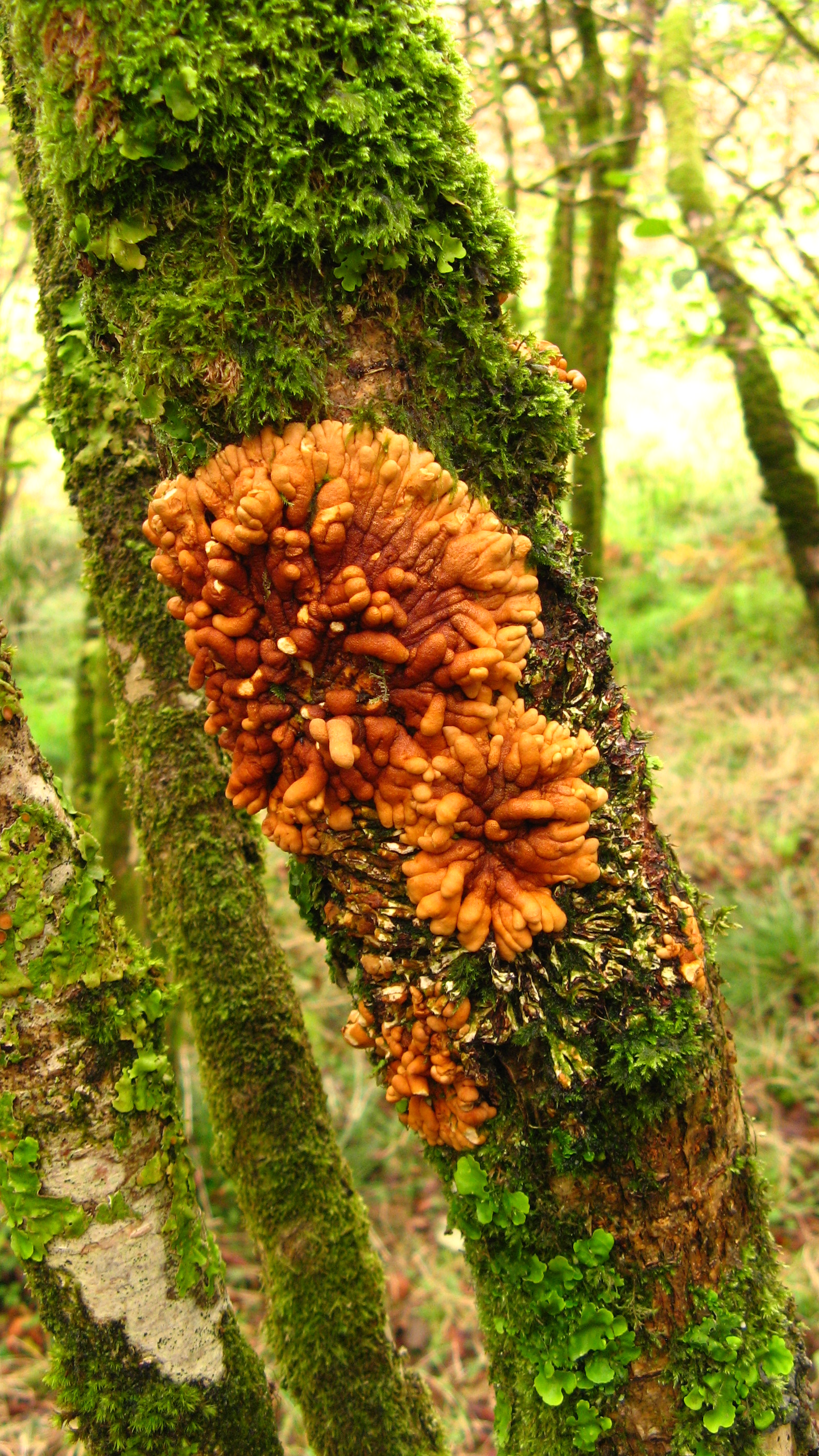
- Hypocreopsis rhododendri on hazel stem

Scientific classification
- Kingdom: Fungi
- Division: Ascomycota
- Class: Sordariomycetes
- Order: Hypocreales
- Family: Hypocreaceae
- Genus: Hypocreopsis
- Species: H. rhododendri

Binomial name
- Hypocreopsis rhododendri Thaxt. (1922)

= Hypocreopsis rhododendri =

Endangered species of fungus

Hypocreopsis rhododendri is an ascomycete fungus. It is commonly known as hazel gloves due to the resemblance of its orange-brown, radiating lobular ascocarp to rubber gloves, and because it is found on hazel (Corylus avellana) stems.

== Distribution ==
Hypocreopsis rhododendri is found on the hyperoceanic west coasts of Britain and Ireland, in the Atlantic Pyrenees in south western France, and in the Appalachian Mountains in the eastern United States.

== Habitat ==
=== North America ===
==== Habitat ====
In the Appalachian mountains, H. rhododendri was originally found growing on Rhododendron maximum, and was subsequently found on Kalmia latifolia and Quercus sp.

=== Europe ===
==== Habitat ====
In Europe, H. rhododendri is found in Atlantic hazel woodland, mainly on hazel stems. It has never been found on Rhododendron species. Mainly occurring in the damp temperate rainforests in western Scotland, it has been located in only four woodland sites, including Ballachuan Hazelwood, and Dunollie Wood.

==== Seasonality ====
H. rhododendri primarily occurs in late August to December, preferring damp and cold conditions to the heat.

== Host ==
Although H. rhododendri is found on woody stems, it has been suggested that it is not a wood-decay fungus, but is instead a parasite of the wood-decay fungus Hymenochaete corrugata.
