= Ceunant Llennyrch National Nature Reserve =

Woodland reserve in Gwynedd, Wales

Coordinates: 52.939°N 3.967°W

Ceunant Llennyrch National Nature Reserve is one of several woodland reserves in the Vale of Ffestiniog in Gwynedd, Wales and runs from Llyn Trawsfynydd to the River Dwyryd, near the village of Maentwrog.

The reserve's broad expanse of woodland coats a steep-sided gorge, through which the Afon Prysor cascades. At one point, the river is flanked by one hundred feet (30 m) high cliffs, which face each other only 10 metres (33 feet) apart. The high humidity offered by the falls creates the perfect environment for numerous damp-loving plants, due to the high humidity and high rainfall, it is technically a temperate rainforest.

Expanding Llennyrch Nature Reserve

== Background ==
In December 2015, the 550-acre (220 ha) forest was bought for a price of £1 million by The Woodland Trust. The woodland has been there since the last ice age, and is so deep that apparently, some parts are untouched by humans.

== Flora ==
The forest is exceptionally damp, creating the perfect habitat for nature to flourish. There are over 200 species of liverwort, many forms of moss and lichen too. Trees include sessile oaks, as well as beech, rowan and silver birch. Lichens form on these birches, such as Graphina ruiziana and Parmeliella horrescens. However, the conditions are not kind to flowering plants, due to the shady and damp nature of the environment.

The only population of Pyrenula hibernica in Wales is found at Ceunant Llennyrch and was first described in 2005.

== Fauna ==
The animals of the woodland are also thriving, with many small mammals such as the wood mouse, otter and bank vole making their homes near the river. Otters have difficulty with food, as the acidity of the river water means that fish are not in abundance. Woodpeckers, common redstarts and European pied flycatchers are amongst the most common birds present. In terms of predators, the mice and voles are easy prey for a buzzard, which are frequently spotted.
