= Cwm Doethie – Mynydd Mallaen =

Protected area in Ceredigion, Wales

Cwm Doethie – Mynydd Mallaen is a Site of Special Scientific Interest (SSSI) in Ceredigion and Carmarthenshire, mid Wales. Contained within it is the Allt Rhyd y Groes national nature reserve designated principally because of its sessile oak woodland clinging to near vertical cliffs of the River Doethie gorge.

In 2026, Welsh charity Tir Natur purchased over 480 hectares (1,200 acres) of land in the area for £2.2 million to establish a rewilding project. The land was considered poor for grazing and commercial forestry was not possible because it is within the SSSI.

== See also ==
- Mynydd Mallaen
- List of Sites of Special Scientific Interest in Ceredigion
