= Hafod Garregog National Nature Reserve =

National nature reserve located near the village of Nantmor

Coordinates: 52.987°N 4.030°W

Hafod Garegog National Nature Reserve is a national nature reserve located near the village of Nantmor, about 6 kilometres north of Porthmadog in Gwynedd.

In this reserve, peaty hollows run between three parallel ridges of woodland-covered rock. Fine views can be enjoyed in all directions, with Snowdon and the Aberglaslyn pass providing a stunning landscape to the north, whilst the Moelwyn range fills the skyline to the east. To the south, the broad valley of the River Glaslyn rolls out towards the sea.
