= Oldhead Wood =

Nature Reserve in County Mayo, Ireland

Oldhead Wood Nature Reserve
- Anaclann-Dúlra Choill an tSéanchinn
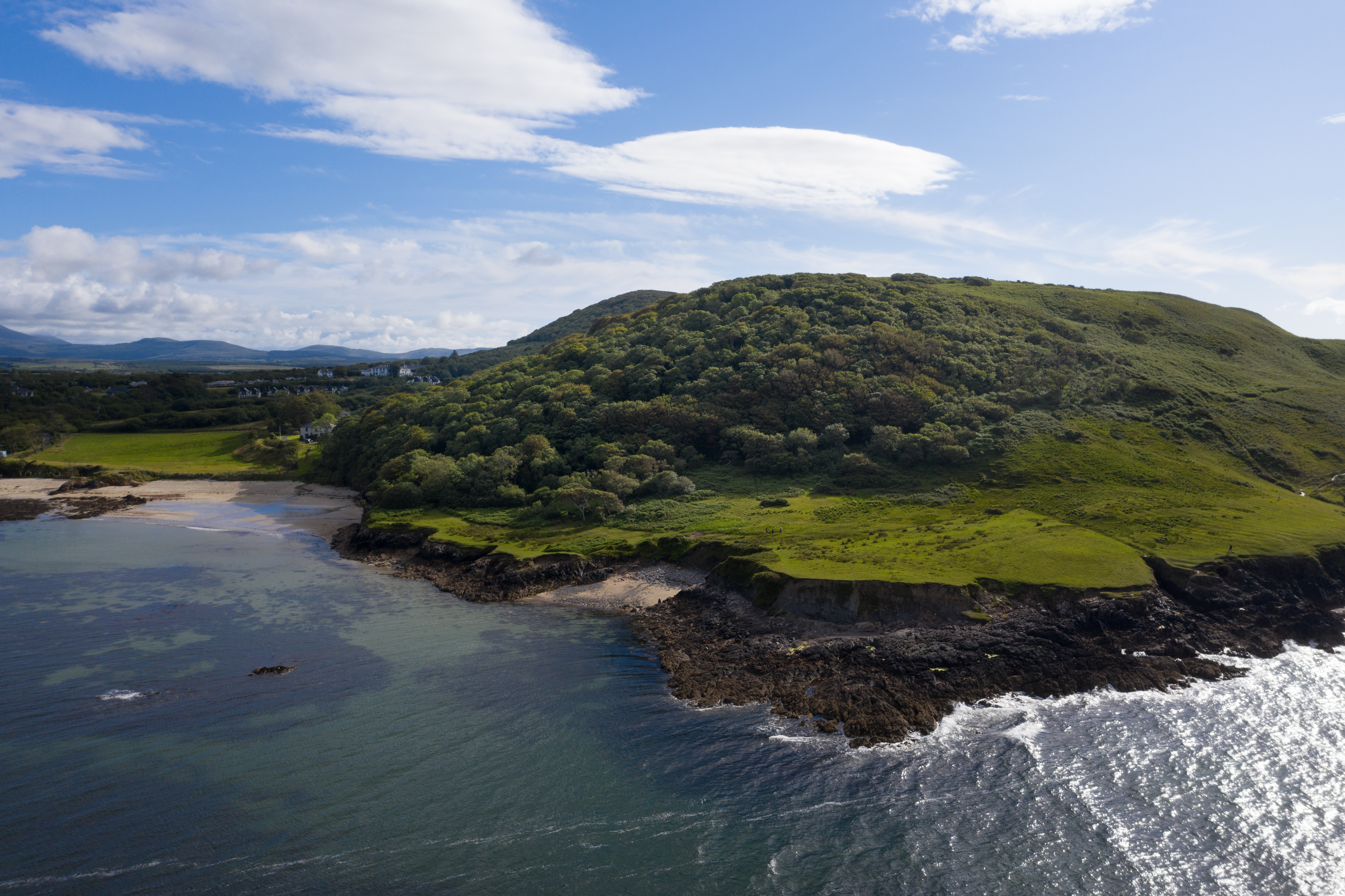

- Location within Ireland
- Type: National
- Location: near Louisburgh, County Mayo
- Coordinates: 53°46′34″N 9°46′41″W
- Area: 42 acres (0.17 km^{2})
- Operator: National Parks and Wildlife Service (Ireland)
- Status: Open all year

Oldhead Wood Nature Reserve (Irish: Anaclann-Dúlra Choill an tSéanchinn) is a national nature reserve of approximately 42 acres (0.17 km^{2}) located on Clew Bay, near Louisburgh, County Mayo, Ireland. It is managed by the Irish National Parks & Wildlife Service, part of the Department of Arts, Heritage and the Gaeltacht.

== Features ==
Oldhead Wood was legally protected as a national nature reserve by the Irish government in 1984. It is also a Special Area of Conservation under the EU Habitats Directive.

The name Oldhead or Old Head also refers to the townland in which the nature reserve is located. The woodlands consist of deciduous trees which have been used and changed by human usage. Its position on Clew Bay gives the area a humid climate, with diverse bryophyte flora. It is a semi-natural woodland with the most prominent tree species being oak, with some willow, birch and rowan. There is also some beech and sycamore that were introduced.

Beneath Oldhead hill there is a place in the dark wood formerly called "Leac-an-afrin" or the Mass flag, where, during the time of the Penal Laws, when Mass was outlawed, priests offered up Mass in secret.
