= Pyrenula hibernica =

Scientific classification
- Kingdom: Fungi
- Division: Ascomycota
- Class: Eurotiomycetes
- Order: Pyrenulales
- Family: Pyrenulaceae
- Genus: Pyrenula
- Species: P. hibernica

Binomial name
- Pyrenula hibernica (Nyl.) Aptroot (2003)

Synonyms
- Parmentaria chilensis Parmentaria chilensis auct. europ. Pyrenula chilensis

Species of lichen

Pyrenula hibernica (also called oil-stain parmentaria) (Note: The common name 'oil-stain parmentaria' links to the species' former name Parmentaria chilensis) is a species of lichen found on the British Isles, in the western Pyrenees, and on the Azores and Madagascar. It has a yellow to dark olive green thallus with black perithecia which can become visible in older specimens, giving rise to the British common name blackberries in custard. (Note: The name is also rendered as blackberries-in-custard and blackberries and custard.)

== Description ==
Pyrenula hibernica is a crustose lichen, growing tight to the bark which it lives on and causing it to split as the tree grows. The thallus of the lichen varies in colour from olive green to yellow-buff; it does not react to the C, K, KC or PD spot tests, but does react to UV exposure, turning pale yellow.

The lichen's perithecia are black, 1–1.2 millimetres (0.039–0.047 in) in diameter, and situated 1–1.5 millimetres (0.039–0.059 in) below the lichen's surface. In some specimens, only the ostiole is visible from the surface but sometimes may be clearly visible if the thallus is more translucent.

The species was originally described as Parmentaria chilensis, which had also been recorded in Colombia and Chile. However, in 2003, a paper by Javiar Etayo and André Aptroot proposed that this should be re-evaluated, with the European and Macaronesian specimens having the name Pyrenula hibernica. They found that the hibernica specimens were different from the type species since they have ascomata (fruiting bodies) which are almost always in groups of two to six with a shared ostiole and smaller ascospores, whereas the Pyrenula chilensis specimens had singular ascoma with their own ostioles and larger ascospores.

== Habitat ==
Pyrenula hibernica grows on the smooth bark of Corylus (hazel), Ilex (holly), and Sorbus trees in sheltered, moist ravines, as well as more open slopes, especially in Ireland. The species is strongly associated with Atlantic hazelwood. It is restricted to temperate rainforest environments.

== Distribution ==
Pyrenula hibernica is a vulnerable species in the IUCN Red List categories, based on criteria D2 (having "a very restricted area of occupancy ... or number of locations").

=== United Kingdom ===
In the United Kingdom, it is a protected species under Schedule 8 of the Wildlife and Countryside Act 1981, section 2(4) of the Nature Conservation (Scotland) Act 2004 and section 42 of the Natural Environment and Rural Communities Act 2006, as well as being designated a Nationally Rare species and a Biodiversity Action Plan priority.

==== Scotland ====
Pyrenula hibernica is present at five sites in western Scotland including at Westerness, Loch Sunart and Mull.

==== Wales ====
The species was first discovered in Wales in 2005 by Neil Sanderson in the Ceunant Llennyrch National Nature Reserve. It was recorded on 14 undisturbed hazel bushes within the Ceunant Llennyrch gorge. It was initially recorded as sterile Pyrenula macrospora because all the characteristic perithecia 'fruit' were fully immersed in the thalli and not visible from the surface; this was corrected after a sample was taken, revealing the fruit. The perithecia are often not visible from the surface in Welsh specimens. In 2016, the lichen was reported on 23 hazel bushes at Ceunant Llennyrch which, as of November 2022, is the only population in Wales.

==== England ====
The species has been recorded in hazel woods in Borrowdale, Cumbria.

=== Madagascar ===
In 2016, Pyrenula hibernica was recorded in Madagascar, marking the species' first recorded specimen from Africa.
