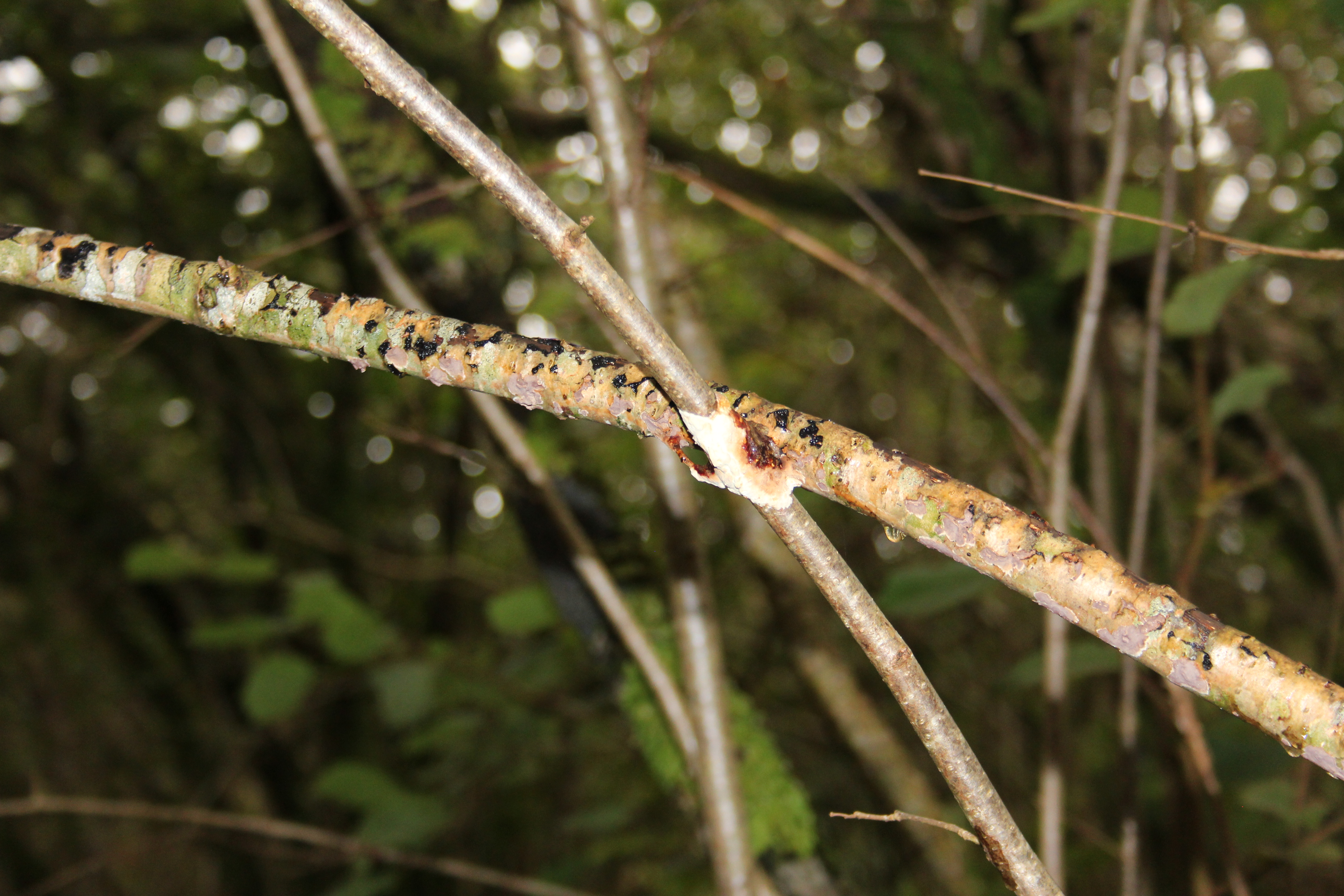
- Hymenochaete corrugata on a hazel twig in Ballachuan Hazelwood, Scotland

Scientific classification
- Domain: Eukaryota
- Kingdom: Fungi
- Division: Basidiomycota
- Class: Agaricomycetes
- Order: Hymenochaetales
- Family: Hymenochaetaceae
- Genus: Hymenochaete
- Species: H. corrugata

Binomial name
- Hymenochaete corrugata (Fr.) Lév., (1846)

Synonyms
- Corticium corrugatum; Hymenochaete agglutinans; Hymenochaete ambiens; Hymenochaete corrugata f. conglutinans; Hymenochaete croceoferruginea; Hymenochaete insularis; Stereum corrugatum; Thelephora corrugata; Thelephora padi; Xerocarpus corrugatus

= Hymenochaete corrugata =

Species of fungus

Hymenochaete corrugata is a plant pathogen that causes glue crust in its hosts.

== Hosts and symptoms ==
Hosts and symptoms are crucial to know when trying to identify a pathogen of disease. In order for the pathogen to be identified, its common hosts and key symptoms must be accessible. The primary hosts of Hymenochaete corrugata are broad-leaved trees, primarily hazel and willow. The disease is called glue crust and stems from the pathogen's habit of moving across trees and gluing together twigs and branches that are in contact with each other.

Common symptoms are an uneven surface caused by setae (surface hairs) and a grey or brown surface tinted lilac on the tree bark. The main sign is the presence of white fruiting bodies that form crusts attached to the trees, typically on the bark of the trunk. Setae can also be seen on the tree bark in the trunk and branches. These fruiting bodies develop cracks over time.

== Environment ==
This disease is primarily localized to Great Britain, Ireland, mainland Europe, and parts of North America. The growing season in Europe is summer and fall. The disease development and spread is favored in woodland areas, primarily Acidophilous Quercus-dominated woodland and broadleaved deciduous woodlands. These woodland environments typically consist of summer-green non-coniferous trees and evergreen trees. These conditions are a temperate climate and are in areas with distinct seasons that make for moderate temperatures due to common rainfall.

== Pathogenesis ==
Regarding the pathogenesis, glue crust essentially glues dead twigs to living branches in the canopy, which prevents the dead twigs from falling to the ground. If they fell to the ground, they would be available to be decomposed by other fungi. Hymenochaete corruguta’s individual genotypes can accomplish this gluing by making sclerotized mycelial pads that form a bridge binding the twigs together from various stools. The pads created can also allow for attachment to other trees, not just twigs in the same tree.

The fungus essentially can go back and forth between different modes of mycelial development and producing melanized pseudosclerotial plates, and then spreads from branch to branch through these glued-together pseudosclerotia.
