= Ganllwyd =

Village and community in Gwynedd, Wales

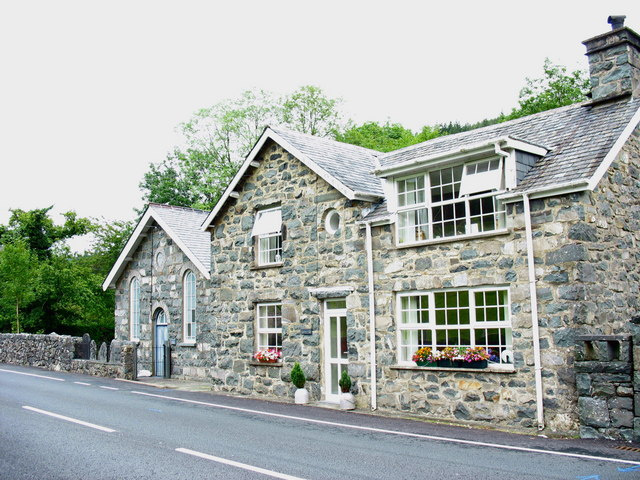
- Stone house and chapel in Ganllwyd

- Location within Gwynedd
- Population: 179 (2011)
- OS grid reference: SH726244
- Community: Ganllwyd
- Principal area: Gwynedd
- Country: Wales
- Sovereign state: United Kingdom
- Post town: DOLGELLAU
- Postcode district: LL40
- Dialling code: 01341
- Police: North Wales
- Fire: North Wales
- Ambulance: Welsh
- UK Parliament: Dwyfor Meirionnydd
- Senedd Cymru – Welsh Parliament: Dwyfor Meirionnydd
- List of places UK Wales Gwynedd 52.801°N 3.888°W Map of the community

Ganllwyd is a small village and community in southern Gwynedd, Wales. It lies in the Snowdonia National Park to the north of Dolgellau. A470 passes through it. The Community population taken at the 2011 Census was 179.

== Geography ==
The village, which lies where the old Roman road used to ford the River Eden just before it joins with the rivers Mawddach and River Gamlan has 3 large waterfalls and many smaller ones all within Coed y Brenin (the forest of the king).

== Features ==
The village includes Dolmelynllyn Hall (owned by the National Trust), and the area is also referred to as the Dolmelynllyn estate. One author suggests an Arthurian link to the village but there is no other corroboration.

The village is now surrounded by Forestry Commission and National Trust parkland of conifers and oaks. A large area of surrounding ancient oak woodland is a designated SSSI and has a particularly rich temperate maritime Bryophyte community. The forest has a group of Wellingtonia planted in the early 20th century and Dolmelynllyn has two trees dating from the 1850s in the meadow, one being the second largest in Wales. The forests are full of wildlife, with deer, red squirrels, pine martens, polecats, otters, and other mammals, and a variety of birds from black grouse to merlins, magpies, buzzards, and red kites. There are many walks from the village into the forest, and several free car parks.

== Governance ==
Ganllwyd has a community council, responsible for maintenance of local footpaths, footbridges and, until 2017, public toilets. At 179, the community council has the smallest population of any council in Wales. The small population of residents in Ganllwyd are known locally as Gans.

For elections to Gwynedd County Council Ganllwyd is part of a combined Brithdir and Llanfachreth/Ganllwyd/Llanelltyd electoral ward.
