= List of Sites of Special Scientific Interest in Wales =

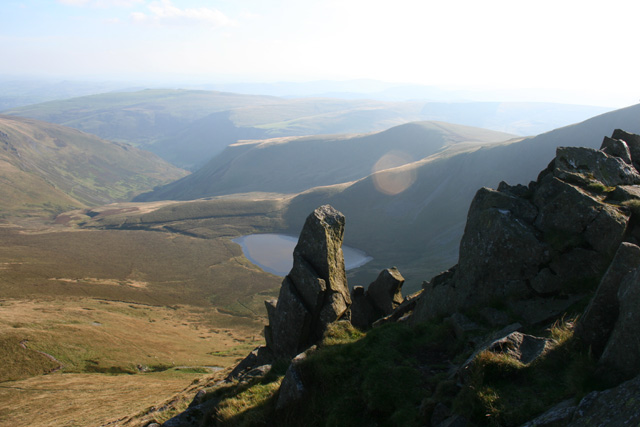
Cadair Berwyn North Top in the Berwyn range, an SSSI.

A Site of Special Scientific Interest (SSSI) is a conservation designation denoting a protected area in Wales, as elsewhere in United Kingdom. SSSIs are the basic building block of site-based nature conservation legislation and most other legal nature/geological conservation designations in Great Britain are based upon them, including national nature reserves, Ramsar sites, Special Protection Areas, and Special Areas of Conservation. Sites notified for their biological interest are known as Biological SSSIs, and those notified for geological or physiographic interest are Geological SSSIs. Many SSSIs are notified for both biological and geological interest.

== Background ==
SSSIs in the UK are notified using the concept of an Area of Search (AOS), an area of between 400 km^{2} (150 sq mi) and 4,000 km^{2} (1,500 sq mi) in size. The Areas of Search were conceived and developed between 1975 and 1979 by the Nature Conservancy Council (NCC), based on regions created by the Local Government Act 1972. Whereas England had its Areas of Search based on 46 counties, those in Wales were based on a combination of the counties and smaller districts. In 1974, Wales was divided into 8 counties, with 37 districts. The NCC created 12 Welsh Areas of Search; they mostly follow county borders, but the larger counties (Dyfed, Powys and Gwynedd) were divided into multiple Areas using district borders. Mid and South Glamorgan were merged into a single AOS, whilst Llanelli district was included in the West Glamorgan AOS.

Due to subsequent local government reorganisation in the UK since 1972, many counties and districts have been divided, merged or renamed. Using the AOS system alone would make it difficult to search for individual SSSI citations via the Countryside Council for Wales (CCW) database without knowing 1972 region divisions. As a result, the CCW groups Welsh SSSIs using the subdivisions of Wales formed in April 1996 by the Local Government (Wales) Act 1994, resulting in 22 principal areas.

For SSSIs elsewhere in the UK, see List of SSSIs by Area of Search.

There are between 1,019 (as of 2017) and 1,078 (as of 2021) sites of special scientific interest in Wales, accounting for 235,000 hectares (580,000 acres), making up over 12% of Wales' land area. The smallest SSSI is the Lesser Horseshoe bat roost in Pembrokeshire (0.004 hectares (430 sq ft)), while the Berwyn mountain range (24,321 hectares (60,100 acres)) is the largest. Most SSSIs in Wales are in private ownership, however some are under the ownership and management of local wildlife trusts, or other voluntary conservation bodies. The first SSSI designated in Wales was from 1949. 99 coal tips in Wales are also SSSIs.

They are designated under the Wildlife and Countryside Act 1981, amended by the Countryside and Rights of Way Act 2000 and Natural Environment and Rural Communities Act 2006, with Natural Resources Wales being the responsible body for SSSIs in Wales.

== List ==
=== By Area of Search ===
Area of Search	Number of sites				Sites list
Area of Search	Biological	Geological	Both	Total	Sites list
Brecknockshire	TBC	TBC	TBC	84	List of SSSIs in Brecknock
Carmarthen & Dinefwr	TBC	TBC	TBC	79	List of SSSIs in Carmarthen & Dinefwr
Ceredigion	TBC	TBC	TBC	100	List of SSSIs in Ceredigion
Clwyd	TBC	TBC	TBC	81	List of SSSIs in Clwyd
East Gwynedd	TBC	TBC	TBC	103	List of SSSIs in East Gwynedd
Gwent	TBC	TBC	TBC	78	List of SSSIs in Gwent
Mid & South Glamorgan	TBC	TBC	TBC	69	List of SSSIs in Mid & South Glamorgan
Montgomeryshire	TBC	TBC	TBC	76	List of SSSIs in Montgomery
Preseli & South Pembrokeshire	TBC	TBC	TBC	75	List of SSSIs in Preseli & South Pembrokeshire
Radnorshire	TBC	TBC	TBC	87	List of SSSIs in Radnor
West Glamorgan	TBC	TBC	TBC	56	List of SSSIs in West Glamorgan
West Gwynedd	TBC	TBC	TBC	135	List of SSSIs in West Gwynedd

=== By principal area ===
- List of Sites of Special Scientific Interest in Anglesey
- List of Sites of Special Scientific Interest in Blaenau Gwent
- List of Sites of Special Scientific Interest in Bridgend County Borough
- List of Sites of Special Scientific Interest in Caerphilly County Borough
- List of Sites of Special Scientific Interest in Cardiff
- List of Sites of Special Scientific Interest in Carmarthenshire
- List of Sites of Special Scientific Interest in Ceredigion
- List of Sites of Special Scientific Interest in Conwy County Borough
- List of Sites of Special Scientific Interest in Denbighshire
- List of Sites of Special Scientific Interest in Flintshire
- List of Sites of Special Scientific Interest in Gwynedd
- List of Sites of Special Scientific Interest in Merthyr Tydfil County Borough
- List of Sites of Special Scientific Interest in Monmouthshire
- List of Sites of Special Scientific Interest in Neath Port Talbot
- List of Sites of Special Scientific Interest in Newport
- List of Sites of Special Scientific Interest in Pembrokeshire
- List of Sites of Special Scientific Interest in Powys
- List of Sites of Special Scientific Interest in Rhondda Cynon Taf
- List of Sites of Special Scientific Interest in Swansea
- List of Sites of Special Scientific Interest in Torfaen
- List of Sites of Special Scientific Interest in the Vale of Glamorgan
- List of Sites of Special Scientific Interest in Wrexham County Borough

=== By other ===
- List of Sites of Special Scientific Interest in the Brecon Beacons National Park
