= List of Sites of Special Scientific Interest in Bridgend County Borough =

Map of Bridgend County Borough within Wales

This is a list of the Sites of Special Scientific Interest (SSSIs) in the Bridgend Area of Search (AoS).

== History ==
This Area of Search was formed from parts of the previous AoS of Mid Glamorgan, with one site, Penycastell, coming from West Glamorgan.

== Sites ==
- Blackmill Woodlands
- Bryn–bach, Cefn Cribwr
- Brynna a Wern Tarw
- Caeau Cefn Cribwr
- Coedymwstwr Woodland
- Cwm Cyffog
- Cwm Du Woodlands
- Cwm Risca Meadow
- Cynffig-Kenfig
- Daren y Dimbath
- Merthyr Mawr
- Penycastell, Cefn Cribwr
- Stormy Down
- Waun Cimla
- Waun-fawr, Cefn Cribwr

== Former sites ==
- Cwm Caner Mawr: the valley of the Nant Caner Mawr, a tributary of the River Ogmore in the community of Coychurch Higher. The valley floor is a mire with flushes.

== See also ==
- List of SSSIs by Area of Search
