= List of Sites of Special Scientific Interest in Rhondda Cynon Taf =

Map of Rhondda Cynon Taf within Wales

This is a list of the Sites of Special Scientific Interest (SSSIs) in the Rhondda Cynon Taf Area of Search (AoS).

== Sites ==
- Blaenrhondda Road Cutting
- Brofiscin Quarry, Groes Faen
- Bryncarnau Grasslands
- Brynna a Wern Tarw
- Castell Coch Woodland and road section
- Cors Bryn-y-Gaer
- Craig Pont Rhondda
- Craig-y-Llyn
- Cwm Cadlan
- Dyffrynoedd Nedd a Mellte a Moel Penderyn
- Ely Valley
- Llantrisant Common and Pastures
- Mynydd Ty-Isaf, Rhondda
- Nant Gelliwion Woodland
- Penmoelallt
- Rhos Tonyrefail
- Woodland Park and Pontpren
