= List of Sites of Special Scientific Interest in the Vale of Glamorgan =

Map of Vale of Glamorgan within Wales

This is a list of the Sites of Special Scientific Interest (SSSIs) in the Vale of Glamorgan Area of Search (AoS).

== Sites ==
- Barry Island
- Breigam Moor
- Clemenstone Meadows, Wick
- Cliff Wood - Golden Stairs
- Cnap Twt
- Coed y Bwl
- Coedydd y Barri / Barry Woodlands
- Cog Moors
- Cors Aberthin
- Cwm Cydfin, Leckwith
- East Aberthaw Coast
- Ely Valley
- Ewenny and Pant Quarries
- Hayes Point to Bendrick Rock
- Larks Meadows
- Llynnoedd Cosmeston / Cosmeston Lakes
- Monknash Coast
- Nant Whitton Woodlands
- Nash Lighthouse Meadow
- Old Castle Down
- Penarth Coast
- Pencoedtre Woods
- Pysgodlyn Mawr
- Severn Estuary
- Southerndown Coast
- Sully Island
- The Parish Field (Cae r Rhedyn)
