= List of Sites of Special Scientific Interest in Cardiff =

Map of Cardiff within Wales

This is a list of the Sites of Special Scientific Interest (SSSIs) in the Cardiff Area of Search (AoS).

== History ==
This Area of Search was formed from parts of the previous AoS of Mid & South Glamorgan.

== Sites ==
- Caeau Blaen-bielly
- Castell Coch Woodlands and Road Section
- Coed y Bedw
- Ely Valley
- Fforestganol a Chwm Nofydd
- Flat Holm
- Garth Wood
- Long Wood (Glamorganshire Canal local nature reserve)
- Gwent Levels - Rumney
- Lisvane Reservoir
- Llanishen and Lisvane Reservoir Embankments
- Penylan Quarry
- Rhymney River Section
- Rumney Quarry
- Severn Estuary
- Ty Du Moor

== See also ==
- List of SSSIs by Area of Search
