= List of Sites of Special Scientific Interest in Gwent =

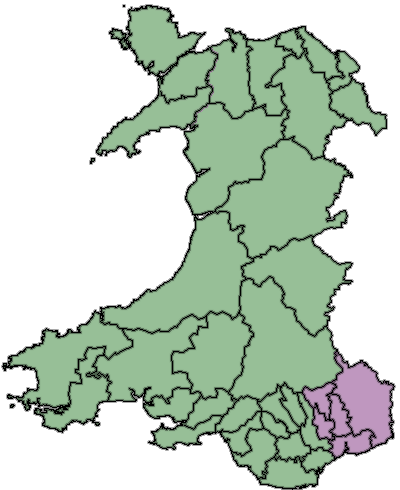
Gwent AOS

Lists of Sites of Special Scientific Interest in Gwent comprise:

- List of Sites of Special Scientific Interest in Blaenau Gwent
- List of Sites of Special Scientific Interest in Caerphilly County Borough
- List of Sites of Special Scientific Interest in Monmouthshire
- List of Sites of Special Scientific Interest in Newport
- List of Sites of Special Scientific Interest in Torfaen
