= List of Sites of Special Scientific Interest in Caerphilly County Borough =

Map of Caerphilly within Wales

This is a list of the Sites of Special Scientific Interest (SSSIs) in the Caerphilly Area of Search (AoS).

== History ==
This Area of Search was formed from parts of the previous AoSs of Gwent and Mid & South Glamorgan.

== Sites ==
- Aberbargoed Grasslands
- Cefn Onn
- Cefn y Brithdir
- Coed-y-darren
- Dan y Graig Quarry, Risca
- Gwaun Gledyr
- Llanbradach Quarry
- Lower House Stream Section
- Memorial Park Meadows
- Nelson Bog
- Penllwyn Grasslands
- Ruperra Castle and Woodlands
- Wern Ddu Claypits

== See also ==
- List of SSSIs by Area of Search
