= Llantrisant Church =

Church in Rhondda Cynon Taf, UK

Coordinates: 51.541662°N 3.376453°W

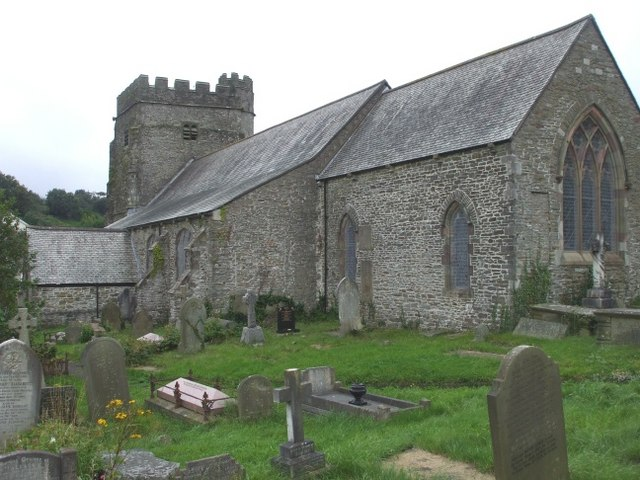
Llantrisant Church exterior

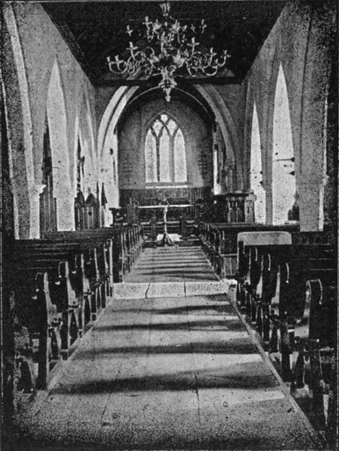
Llantrisant Church interior

Llantrisant Church (Church of St Illtyd, St Gwynno and St Dyfodwg, also styled "The Mother Church") is located in Llantrisant, Rhondda Cynon Taf, Glamorgan, Wales. Built within a short distance of Llantrisant Castle, it was originally in the Norman style of architecture. When described in History of Llantrisant, Glamorganshire (1898), little of the original church remained, with the only traces of Norman architecture being the baptismal font, a portion of the south door, and the lower part of the western arch of the nave. The tower, which is about 70 feet (21 m) high, contains a peal of six bells. The living is a vicarage. Llantrisant Church is a Grade II* listed building.

== History ==
The church was restored in 1873, at a cost of nearly 3000. In 1894, the tower and west end of the nave were restored at a cost of about 1200, when the bells were re-hung, and a white marble baptistery, for baptism by immersion was placed under the tower. There were 333 Free Sittings. Llantrisant Church was founded at a very early period; there appears to be no precise date of the foundation. The church was dedicated to the three Saints, Illtyd, Gwyno, and Tyfodwg. Iolo Morganwg MSS. mentions that "Einion ab Collwyn founded Llantrisant after Llangawrdaf was burnt. This Llangawrdaf is supposed to be near the old monastery of St. Cawrdav, to the south of Llantrisant." From where Iolo obtained this information is not mentioned.

Reference to Llantrisant Church is made in Survey, Exchequer Q.R., Roll 30. 1262. Calendar Inquisition, Record Office, Edward II., page 165. Gilbert de Clare had the advowson of Church. Clark's "Carte de Glamorgan," vol. II.. page 396, mentions indenture of 20 Charles II.. 1668. Sir E. Stradling to W. Prior, conveyance of advowson of Llantrisant Church with others to the said W. Prior. References are also made in vol. III., page 489,'also vol.. IV., page 557. The living is a vicarage in the Archdeaconry and Diocese of Llandaff, rated in the king's books at ^"24 14s. 2d., endorsed, with the vicarial tithes of the parishes of Aberdare, Llantwit, Llanwonno, and Ystrad-dyfodwg; in the Dean and Chapter of Gloucester, to whom the rectorial belong. These tithes are now collected by the Ecclesiastical Commissioners of England and Wales.

== Chapels ==
There are also several chapels to Llantrisant, Llanilltyd, or Llantwit Vardre (St. Illtyd) Ystrad-dytodwg (St. Tyfodwg); Llanwonno (St. Gwyno); Aberdare (St. John the Baptist). The three first-mentioned chapels are in the patronage of the vicar of Llantrisant; the fourth has also been in the same patronage, but were given up to the Lord Bute on certain conditions. Aberdare Chapel is endowed with ^2,400 Queen Anne's Bounty; there are two Chapelries without the cure of souls in the parish of Llantrisant, one at Tonyrefail dedicated to St. John the Baptist, which is a perpetual curacy, endowed with /"i,888 Queen Anne's Bounty, and 40 acres of land; and in the patronage of the Prichard family of" Collenna.' In this Chapelry, engraved on a stone, is the following inscription: "Catherine Powell, of Wilton, widow, gave to 7 poor people, near dwelling-house, the use and benefit of one milch cow, together with 2 shillings and 6 pence, to each poor, every candlemas forever." The other chapelry is called Talygarn. After being long suffered to fall into decay, it was repaired, and a magnificent new church, built by G. T. Clark, Esq., of Talygarn. The living was a perpetual curacy endowed with ^"1,400 Queen Anne's Bounty, and £10 a year for ever from Sir Leoline Jenkins, and is in the patronage of the Principal and Fellows of Jesus College, Oxford.

Llantrisant Church is styled "The Mother Church" and the expression can only mean that the edifice so designated is of older foundation than the several chapels dependent upon it, and this is very generally admitted, it is certain that the church of Llantrisant is a church of the first or oldest foundation.

== Bells ==
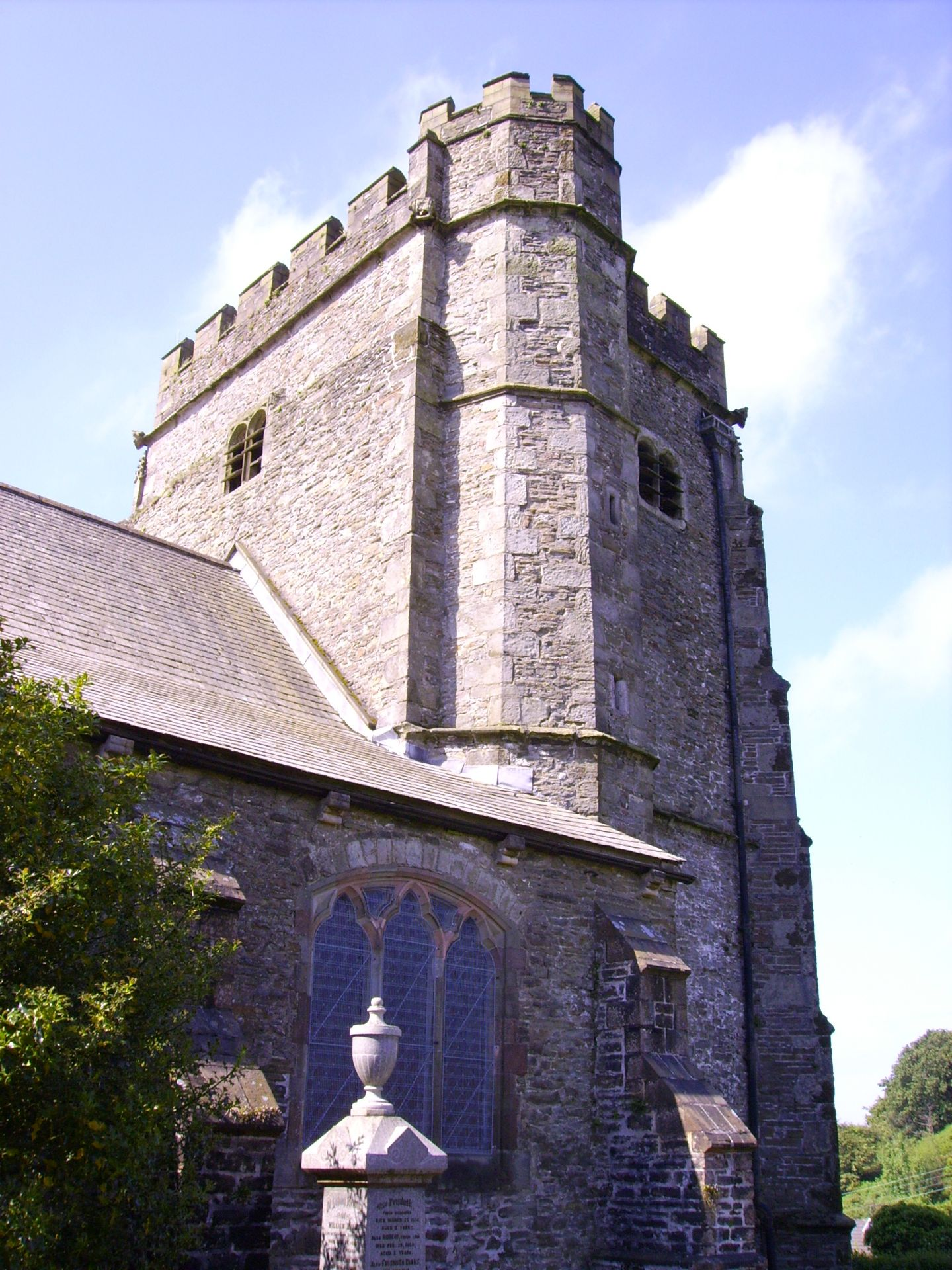
Tower

The bells, six in number, are engraved with the following inscriptions:

- 1st. "Prosperity to those that love good bells. E. E., 1718."
- 2nd. "Gloria Deo in excelsis, pax in terris, E.E., 1718."
- 3rd. "Anglicana, contra Pop: Et Fanaticos Floreat Ecclesia, 1718."
- 4th. "Morgan David, Evan Morgan, Ch. Wardens, E.E., 1718.".
- 5th. "Jacobus Harris, Sacer, Theologia, 1718."
- Tenor bell, "Richardus Jenkins De Hensol Armigher, E.E., Anno Domini, 1718."

In October, 1893, while some workmen were carrying out some excavations for the restoration of the tower, under the supervision of Mr. Carter, the Architect, and Mr. C. Cooksley, the Contractor, they came across a most singular discovery, which turned out to be the mold for casting bells, also the furnace and other arrangements for casting. The pit, after use, had been simply filled in, and paved over, and the matter lost sight of. This plainly shows that the present peal of Bells were cast in the discovered foundry. It seems extraordinary that the belfry of a church should be used as a foundry, an incident rarely known in Wales. Some of the bells required re-casting and tuning. The work was done by Messrs. Carr, of Smethwick, who very arranged room for two more bells to be erected.

== Architecture and fittings ==
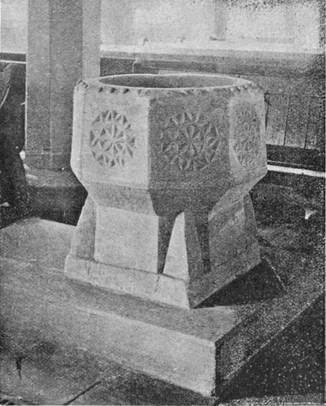
Baptismal font

The baptismal font is of ancient date, and fine workmanship, having been chiselled out of the solid stone, supposed to be of the 12th century period.

The interior view of the church shows the brass candelabra, presented by Anne Bassett, which was often used before the introduction of gas, for lighting the church. Inscription: "The Gift of Mrs. Anne Bassett, late of Miskin, to the parish Church of Llantrisant."

The brass lectern was the gift of Mrs. Jones, of Coventry Street, London, in commemoration of her family and relations who have been connected with Llantrisant for centuries. Inscription: "This Lectern was presented to Llantrisant Parish Church in 1893 by Mrs. Cecilia Jones, nee Lewis, in loving memory of her Family, who were all born in this Parish."

The communion plate, which is of silver, has the following inscription: "For we have seen his star in the east, and we come to worship him." The Gift of William and Jane Matthews, of Llantrisant, October 10, 1750.

There are three brass tablets on the walls of this church; one, in the chancel, in memory of Mr. Prichard, Collena,—one in memory of the Hewett family, who formerly lived at Tyr Mab Ellis,—and one in memory of an infant son of R. Hill-Male, Esq.

The carved oak screen dividing the church from the tower was erected by public subscription in memory of Canon Jones, Vicar of the Parish from 1865 to 1883. There was placed in the wall of the church an effigy of a warrior, which has the appearance of having been placed in a recumbent position before being removed to where it is at present. It is said to represent "Cadwgan Vawr of Miskin, theson of Dafydd ab Cynvrig Vychan, from Rhys Goch, ap Richard, ap Einion, ap Collwyn. He was a man of distinction, when Earl Gilbert de Clare attempted to put down the Welsh tenures, the said Earl was successfully opposed by Cadwgan, who permanently established the "Moes- y Dyfed."

== Stained glass windows ==
The stained glass window in the east end presented by J. Prichard, Esq, (Diocesan Architect) of Llandaff, and other-members of the Prichard family, with the following Latin inscription: "Hanc fenestram Dei Gloriae memores necnon et proavorum in hac parochia per multa saecula degenerum qui supersunt de stirpe Prichard de Collenna sede hac domini jam faustas restaurata gratulabundi." The stained glass window on the south side was presented by Evan Evans, Esq., in memory of his brothers, Thomas, Richard, and William, 1872. In the chancel, there are two stained glass windows in memory of the Rev. Evan Morgan, Vicar of Llantrisant, who died 1864, and of his wife, Letitia, who died 1868.

== Monuments ==
Probably the most ancient monument anywhere about the church is the large slab with a roughly carved processional cross, which was built into the outside of the north wall of the Church. This is supposed from its character to have commemorated some ecclesiastical dignitary who lived long before the Norman conquest.

In the churchyard is a tombstone on which is engraved the following Crest, "A dragon's head erased, &c.," which tombstone is said to have been erected on one of the Trumans of Llantrisant, who were descended from the Herberts of Pembroke, and the Trumans of Northampton. Some of the family are now resident in the district. Also there can be seen on a headstone near the tower the inscription recording the death of one David Jenkins, who lived to the advanced age of 107.

== Bibliography ==
- Morgan, Taliesin (1898). History of Llantrisant, Glamorganshire. Clements and Company.
