= CNAP =

CNAP may refer to:

- Centro Nazionale Anti Pandemico, an Italian state laboratory for pandemic research
- Cnap Twt, a disused quarry that is a Site of Special Scientific Interest in the Vale of Glamorgan, south Wales
- Calling Name Presentation (CNAP), functionality on phone networks to provide the name identification of the calling party.
- Centre national des arts plastiques (CNAP), a French institution that supports the visual arts
- Center for Non-Anthropocentric Play, is a Norwegian Biocentric research Laboratory in the line of the philosopher Arne Naess.
- Clann na Poblachta (CnaP), a defunct Irish republican political party
- Colorado Natural Areas Program, a statewide program to protect threatened and endangered species
- Continuous noninvasive arterial pressure (CNAP), method of measuring arterial blood pressure in real-time
