= Quaker Meeting House (Tref y Rhyg, Llantrisant) =

Quaker meeting house and burial ground, Tref y Rhyg, Llantrisant

The Quaker Meeting House (Welsh: Ty Cwrdd y Crynwyr) was built on a small plot of land next to Treferig Isaf farm, Heol Ddu, near Llantrisant, in Rhondda Cynon Taf, United Kingdom. There are many alternate spellings of Tref yr Rhyg that can be seen in various books and Quaker records including Treferig, Treverrig, Treverygg.

John Bevan (1636–1728) initially held illegal meetings of The Society of Friends (known as Quakers) in Treferig; the farm that he had inherited. He gifted the ground for the Meeting house in 1682 and built the small two storey building with a thatched roof. It had a small adjoining burial ground. The Meeting House is now a ruin and one memorial stone remains in the grounds.

John Bevan and his wife Barbara Awbrey (1637–1710) bought land in Pennsylvania and emigrated there in July 1683 with their family and over 20 followers on the ship 'Morning Star. In 1704 John Bevan, his wife Barbara and one of their daughters, Barbara; returned to Treferig.

Richard Allen notes that the emigration of the Bevan's to Pennsylvania had a major impact on Quakerism in South Wales. He quotes Tref Y Rhyg meeting records in 1683;

'We ... hereby sertifie ... that great loss we and others have sustained in the removal of our deare friends John ap Bevan [sic] and Barbarah his wife .... both belonging to this Meeting, with their tender family in Pennsylvania .... And further we do certifie that we accounted them as Fillers to this Meeting [and] accounted as nursing father and nursing mother in this place to some weake and young amongst us '

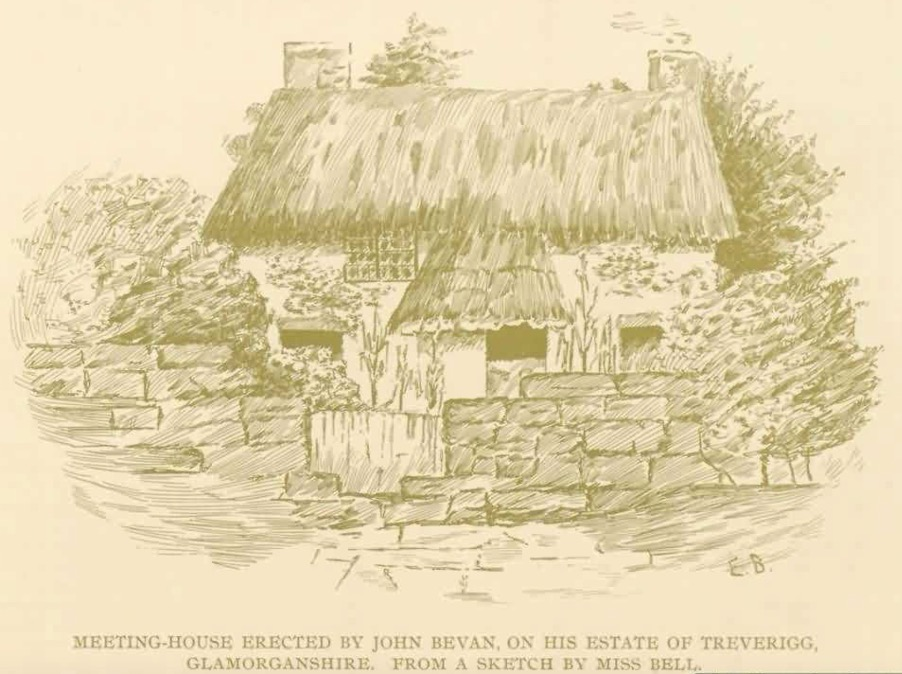
A sketch of the Meeting House (date unknown) by Miss Bell, published in Merion in the Welsh Tract by Thomas Allen Glenn, 1896

== The Burial Ground ==
Barbara Awbrey (married name Bevan) was buried at Treferig, 1710. John Bevan, died 1724 and their daughter Barbara Bevan, are all buried in the graveyard at Tref y rhyg.

John Bevan died at Treverigg aged eighty years, his will bearing the date March 1724–5, being probated October 21, 1726. Bevan's journal published in 'Colonial and Revolutionary families of Pennsylvania' (p140) details his last return journey to Wales. They landed at North Shields, Northumberland, and after attending meeting there, set forward for their old home in Glamorganshire, Wales, a distance of near three hundred miles, visiting a number of Meetings by the way, and the journal continues "about the beginning of the eighth month 1704, we came to our home at Treveyricke".

Barbara Bevan accompanied her husband on this final return to Treverigg and died there as stated in his Journal, February 26, 1710-11 'at the age of seventy-three years and foure months, after a married life of upwards of forty-five years'

The book 'Piety Promoted' writes of the daughter Barbara Bevan (born 1682 buried 1705); 'She had an early passage and departed this Life the Seventh day in the evening, being the 26th of the Eleventh Month 1705. And on the 28th of the same Month, her body was accompanied by relations, friends and neighbours to the meeting house at Treverygg where there was a good meeting, to the Satisfaction and Comfort the many then gathered and after Meeting she was buried aged about 23 years, A Minister about 7 years.'

A memorial tablet in metal was erected on the existing gravestone in 1904 but is now missing. The tablet stated:

Here on the Ground Inherited by Him from
Iestyn ap Gwrgan
lie the remains of
John Bevan
Born in Glamorganshire Wales 1686 died 1728
Judge of the Common Pleas and
Member of the Assembly at Pennsylvania
and of Barbara Aubrey
his wife
Born 1687 died 1710
and Barbaram their daughter
died 1705 aged -- years

Edward John of Coedcernyw, who had been become mentally unwell had been disowned from the Quakers in 1693; was readmitted and buried at Tref y Rhyg. In a short testimony, written after his death, it was note that John had been 'so grievously beset at times that he was tempted to destroy himself... under some anxious thoughts that his heavenly maker had turned his back on him'.

David Edward Pike writes in 2023 that he has reference to the burial ground being used for internment up to the 1850s. He quotes Owen Morgan (1836–1921), better known by his bardic name 'Morien', a well-known Pontypridd journalist and author. Morien wrote of the burial ground in a newspaper article that appeared in the 'Evening Express' on 5 September 1895:

No service has been held there by Quakers within living memory, but the ancient burying ground is still treated with reverence by the country people, and down to a few years ago, if not indeed down to the present day, a Bristol member of the Society of Friends paid 20s. per annum to a labourer in the immediate locality of the graveyard for cutting the grass and keeping the burying ground in proper repair. There are some monumental stones still to be seen there. The spot is far from the hum of the madding crowd, and the only sound there is the music of the clear Glyn River* and the songs of birds.
