= Golden Stairs =

Golden Stairs may refer to:

- The Golden Stairs, an 1870s painting by Edward Burne-Jones
- Golden Stairs (Helena Blavatsky), a set of guidelines to aspirants in the spiritual path laid down by Helena P. Blavatsky
- Cliff Wood – Golden Stairs, an SSSI in the Vale of Glamorgan, south Wales, UK
- Golden Stairway or Golden Stairs, the final climb of the Chilkoot Pass

== See also ==
- Climbing the Golden Stairs, 1929 U.S. musical fantasy film
- Golden Stair Mountain, Ohio, New York, United States
- "Gold Steps," a 2015 song by Neck Deep from the album Life's Not out to Get You
- Stair (disambiguation)
- Golden (disambiguation)
