= Cwm Taf Fechan Woodlands =

Protected area in Glamorgan, Wales

Coordinates: 51°46′16″N 3°23′33″W

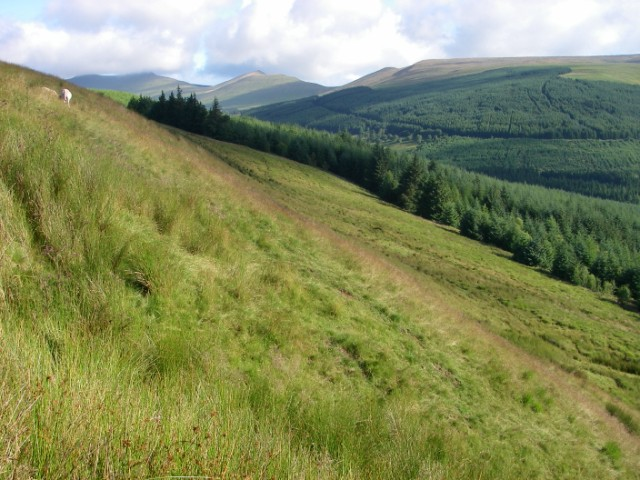
The woodland from Tarren Tormwnt

Cwm Taf Fechan Woodlands is a Site of Special Scientific Interest on the northern outskirts of Merthyr Tydfil, in south Wales. It has semi-natural broadleaved woodland, with a variety of plants, some of which are rare. The 60.9 hectares (150 acres) site under protection is dominated by oak, ash, downy birch, and hazel and hawthorn. The Taf Fechan river flows nearby.

== See also ==
- List of Sites of Special Scientific Interest in Mid & South Glamorgan
