= Fforestganol a Chwm Nofydd =

Protected area in Glamorgan, Wales

- Site of Special Scientific Interest
- Location within Wales
- Location of Fforestganol a Chwm Nofydd.
- Area of search: Mid and South Glamorgan
- Grid reference: ST1490883381
- Coordinates: 51.542887°N 3.2284153°W
- Interest: Biological
- Area: 111.45 ha (275.4 acres)
- Notification date: 19 February 1985

Fforestganol a Chwm Nofydd is a Site of Special Scientific Interest north of the M4 motorway and east of Tongwynlais, in Cardiff, Wales.

== See also ==
- List of Sites of Special Scientific Interest in Mid & South Glamorgan
