= Waun Cimla =

Protected area in Glamorgan, Wales

- Site of Special Scientific Interest
- Location within Wales
- Location of Waun Cimla.
- Area of search: Mid and South Glamorgan
- Grid reference: SS8469883119
- Coordinates: 51.535163°N 3.663784°W
- Interest: Biological
- Area: 15.39 ha (38.0 acres)
- Notification date: 24 March 1992

Waun Cimla, also known as Bedford Park, is a Site of Special Scientific Interest in Glamorgan, south Wales. It contains the Cefn Cribwr Ironworks and some 40 acres of woodlands and meadows.

The SSSI is designated for its marshy grassland habitats, rare plant species and marsh fritillary butterfly.

== See also ==
- List of Sites of Special Scientific Interest in Mid & South Glamorgan
