= Penylan Quarry =

Protected area in Glamorgan, Wales

Coordinates: 51.5016°N 3.1563°W

Penylan Quarry is a quarry and a Site of Special Scientific Interest in Penylan, Cardiff, south Wales. It is a notable paleontological site, containing fossil trilobites and silurian brachiopods.

== See also ==
- List of Sites of Special Scientific Interest in Mid & South Glamorgan
