= Coedymwstwr Woodlands =

Protected area in Glamorgan, Wales

Coed y Mwstwr
- Site of Special Scientific Interest
- Location within Wales
- Location of Coed y Mwstwr.
- Area of search: Wales
- Grid reference: SS9517980977
- Coordinates: 51.517956°N 3.5120934°W
- Interest: Biological
- Area: 15.27 ha (37.7 acres)
- Notification date: 1 January 1979

Coedymwstwr Woodlands is a Site of Special Scientific Interest located between Coychurch and Pencoed in Bridgend County Borough, south Wales.

The woodlands is home to Coed-y-Mwstwr cave, a caving system that has been theorised as a hiding space used by Owain Glyndŵr. The main passage is 5 metres high and 60 metres long.

== See also ==
- List of Sites of Special Scientific Interest in Mid & South Glamorgan
