= Cwm Cyffog =

Protected area in Glamorgan, Wales

- Site of Special Scientific Interest
- Location within Wales
- Location of Cwm Cyffog.
- Area of search: Mid and South Glamorgan
- Grid reference: SS9213490365
- Coordinates: 51.601762°N 3.5588446°W
- Interest: Biological
- Area: 17.29 ha (42.7 acres)
- Notification date: 3 July 1989

Cwm Cyffog is a Site of Special Scientific Interest in Glamorgan, South Wales.

== See also ==
- List of Sites of Special Scientific Interest in Mid & South Glamorgan
