= Mynydd-y-glog =

Hill (389m) in Rhondda Cynon Taf, Wales

Coordinates: 51.7687°N 3.4766°W

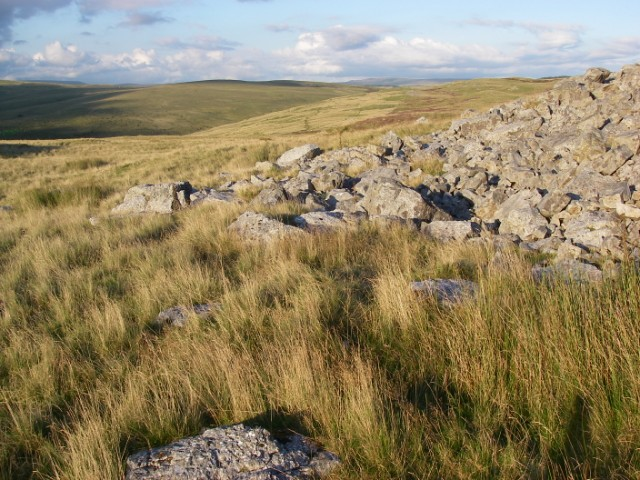
Mynydd-y-Glog in the evening light.

Mynydd-y-glog is a hill just east of the village of Penderyn in the northern corner of the county borough of Rhondda Cynon Taff in south Wales. It lies within the Brecon Beacons National Park and Fforest Fawr Geopark. Its summit plateau rises to a height of 389m / 1277 ft at OS grid ref SN 982088, a spot marked by a trig point. To its north lies the partly dry valley of Pant Sychbant which forms the eastern extension of Cwm Cadlan. Its southern slopes are drained by various streams which feed into the Afon Cynon.

== Geology ==
The hill is composed of a layer cake of rocks laid down during the Carboniferous period. Lowermost, and exposed along its shallow northern scarp, are Carboniferous Limestones whilst above these is the coarse Twrch Sandstone (formerly the 'Basal Grit') of the Marros Group (former 'Millstone Grit Series') also dating from the Carboniferous period. A number of northwest to southeast aligned faults runs across the hill. The limestone gives rise to karstic scenery including numerous shakeholes. These occur on the gritstone area as well as the limestone.

== Archaeology ==
A number of ancient cairns are scattered about the slopes of Mynydd-y-glog.

== Access ==
The hill is designated as open access and is freely available to walkers. A public footpath runs south-eastwards from the Cwm Cadlan road near Wernlas giving access from that direction. The hill can also be gained from the west via the former railway line at Penderyn and via the Natural Resources Wales's woodlands at Penmoelallt to the east.
