= Llanbradach Quarry =

Protected area in Glamorgan, Wales

Llanbradach Quarry is a Site of Special Scientific Interest in Caerphilly County Borough, south Wales.

== See also ==
- List of Sites of Special Scientific Interest in Mid & South Glamorgan
