= Mynydd Ty-Isaf, Rhondda =

Protected area in Glamorgan, Wales

Mynydd Tŷ-isaf, Rhondda
- Site of Special Scientific Interest
- Location within Wales
- Location of Mynydd Tŷ-isaf, Rhondda.
- Area of search: Wales
- Grid reference: SS9285196797
- Coordinates: 51.659709°N 3.5504665°W
- Interest: Biological
- Area: 323.88 ha (800.3 acres)
- Notification date: 1 January 1972

Mynydd Ty-Isaf, Rhondda is a Site of Special Scientific Interest near Treherbert in Rhondda Cynon Taf, south Wales.

== See also ==
- List of Sites of Special Scientific Interest in Mid & South Glamorgan
