= Caeau Cefn Cribwr =

Protected area in Glamorgan, Wales

- Site of Special Scientific Interest
- Location within Wales
- Location of Caeau Cefn Cribwr.
- Area of search: Mid and South Glamorgan
- Grid reference: SS8576983080
- Coordinates: 51.535031°N 3.6483368°W
- Interest: Biological
- Area: 25.07 ha (61.9 acres)
- Notification date: 20 November 1989

Caeau Cefn Cribwr is a Site of Special Scientific Interest near Cefn Cribwr in Bridgend, south Wales.

The Countryside Council for Wales states that the site has been categorised as a Site of Special Interest for "...its marshy grassland and species-rich neutral grassland. Smaller areas of wet heath, woodland and scrub add to the interest. It is also of special interest for populations of three rare plants: marsh fern, soft-leaved sedge and viper's grass. Marsh Fritillary butterfly can be found here."

== See also ==
- List of Sites of Special Scientific Interest in Mid & South Glamorgan
