= Coed y Bedw =

Protected area in Glamorgan, Wales

Coed y Bedw is a Site of Special Scientific Interest (SSSI) in near Gwaelod-y-Garth, within the boundaries of Cardiff in south Wales, it is 4.8 kilometres (3.0 miles) to the northwest of the city. It comprises 16.6 hectares (41 acres) of deciduous woodland and contains many rare plants which were purchased from the Forestry Commission by the Wildlife Trust of South & West Wales in 1984 and is their nature reserve.

== Description ==
Coed Y Bedw takes up much of a steep north-facing slope underlain by the Garth Hill Coal Measures and the Carboniferous limestone of the Little Garth. At the bottom of the slope in the wetter valley bottom there is alder woodland and as one moves up the slope this grades into a mixed deciduous woodland of oak and birch while beech woodland is found in the northern and western sections of the reserve. Mixed woodlands where ash is an important tree species is found in the parts of the wood underlain by limestone to the south. Two calcareous springs discharge from the ground in the southwest of the reserve and they flow into the acidic waters of the Nant Cwmllwydrew as it flows eastwards along its valley. One of these springs is named the Fynnon Gruffydd.

== History ==
The rocks underlying Coed y Bedw include coal measures and seams of haematite and these were exploited in small scale mining operations in the 19th Century. Relics from these activities can be seen on the site and these include diggings, tramways, spoil heaps and the arch which formed the entrance to a mine, as well as the ruin of a stone cottage which was the home of the mine's owner, the poet Morgan Thomas. Mining operations halted in 1913.

== Wildlife ==
Coedy Bedw has a mixture of acidic and calcareous water in its drainage system and this supports an interesting invertebrate fauna, including the uncommon giant lacewing, the larvae of which develop among moss on the banks of streams. The differing soils in the woods are preferred by certain plants, in the lower, damper areas with acidic soils there are lousewort, heath bedstraw and bluebells in the while in the higher, base rich soils wild garlic and spindle.

== See also ==
- List of Sites of Special Scientific Interest in Mid & South Glamorgan
