= List of Sites of Special Scientific Interest in Merthyr Tydfil County Borough =

Map of Merthyr Tydfil within Wales

This is a list of the Sites of Special Scientific Interest (SSSIs) in the Merthyr Tydfil Area of Search (AoS).

== Sites ==
- Baltic and Tyler-bont Quarries
- Brecon Beacons
- Cwm Glo a Glyndyrys
- Cwm Taf Fechan Woodlands
- Daren Fach
- Nant Glais Caves
