= Blackmill Woodlands =

Protected woodland in Glamorgan, Wales

- Site of Special Scientific Interest
- Location within Wales
- Location of Blackmill Woodlands.
- Area of search: Mid and South Glamorgan
- Grid reference: SS9296485912
- Coordinates: 51.561896°N 3.5455063°W
- Interest: Biological
- Area: 70.56 ha (174.4 acres)
- Notification date: 1 January 1972

Blackmill Woodlands is woodland which is designated as a Site of Special Scientific Interest and a Special Area of Conservation near Blackmill in Bridgend County Borough, south Wales, formerly it was in Glamorgan.

== Description ==
Blackmill Woodlands with an area of 431.24 hectares (1,065.6 acres) is an old sessile oak woods, one of the most southerly of this woodland type in Wales. It is a relatively dry site and this means that the ground flora is limited however, the main habitat combination of the oak canopy and ground flora typical of acid soils such as bilberry and wavy hair-grass alongside a moderate cover of ferns and bryophytes is present. The long history of human use can be seen in the distinctively gnarly look that many of the trees have.

== Wildlife ==
Blackmill Woodlands is a site surveyed undert the British Trust for Ornithology's Breeding Bird Survey and has many species typical of western Britain's sessile oak dominated woodlands such as pied flycatcher, wood warbler and common redstart

== Management ==
Blackmill Woodlands are wholly common land and are the subject of rights of common going back to the Middle Ages. Among these common rights are the lopping of branches for firewood, a practice which has created the obviously gnarled appearance of a lot of the trees. There has also been significant grazing pressure in the past which has led to a uniform age structure and diminished ground flora. However, some areas have been fenced in the last ten years, leading to a significant increase in ground flora and natural regeneration.

== See also ==
- List of Sites of Special Scientific Interest in Mid & South Glamorgan
