= Bryn–bach, Cefn Cribwr =

Protected area in Glamorgan, Wales

Bryn Bach, Cefn Cribwr
- Site of Special Scientific Interest
- Location within Wales
- Location of Bryn Bach, Cefn Cribwr.
- Area of search: Wales
- Grid reference: SS8705383095
- Coordinates: 51.535424°N 3.6298375°W
- Interest: Biological
- Area: 40.37 ha (99.8 acres)
- Notification date: 4 December 2000

Bryn–bach, Cefn Cribwr is a Site of Special Scientific Interest in Cefn Cribwr, south Wales.

It is of special interest for its marshy grassland and species-rich neutral grassland. It is also of special interest for the presence of Myrica gale.

== See also ==
- List of Sites of Special Scientific Interest in Mid & South Glamorgan
