= Craig Pont Rhondda =

Protected area in Glamorgan, Wales

Coordinates: 51.638954°N 3.460982°W

Craig Pont Rhondda is a Site of Special Scientific Interest in Llwynypia, Rhondda, south Wales.

The Countryside Council for Wales states that the site has been categorised as a Site of Special Interest because it "...is the largest remaining broadleaved woodland in the valley of the Rhondda Fawr. The dominant tree is Sessile Oak, some stands of which have been coppiced in the past. Other trees include ash, birch, and hazel, with stands of alder in the wetter places."

== See also ==
- List of Sites of Special Scientific Interest in Mid & South Glamorgan
