= Aberbargoed Grasslands =

Protected area in Glamorgan, Wales

- Site of Special Scientific Interest
- Location within Wales
- Location of Aberbargoed Grasslands.
- Area of search: Gwent
- Grid reference: ST1634399205
- Coordinates: 51°41′21″N 03°12′28″W
- Interest: Biological
- Area: 42.5 ha
- Notification date: 26 February 1998

Aberbargoed Grasslands is a Site of Special Scientific Interest in the Rhymney Valley in Mid & South Glamorgan, South Wales. The area was designated a national nature reserve in 2012 largely due to its population of marsh fritillary butterflies. It is managed by Caerphilly County Borough.

== Geography ==
The site covers an area of 42.5 hectares (105 acres) of the Rhymney Valley, located on a southwest-facing slope, roughly one kilometre (0.62 mi) from Bargoed. Parts of the site had previously been used as farmland. Due to the site never being routinely drained, the wet grasslands area has produced a fertile breeding ground for wildlife.

The lowland grasslands that make up part of the site are adjudged to be an increasingly rare form of habitat within Great Britain. The marsh fritillary butterfly, a species that has become increasingly displaced due to loss of habitat, has a significant population at the site. The population was regarded as a primary reason for the site's designation as a reserve by the Joint Nature Conservation Committee (JNCC). The butterfly population had previously been under threat after an arson attack in 2009 had destroyed a portion of their habitat. The site also qualified for reserve status due to the presence of Molinia meadows.

The JNCC report characterised the grasslands as being made up of around 48% humid and mesophile grasslands, 30% deciduous woodlands and 12.8% shrubland with the remaining area consisting of dry grassland, bogs, man-made structures and bodies of water.

== History ==
In 2012, the site became the first area in the Caerphilly County Borough to be designated a national nature reserve. It was also the first area in an urban setting to be designated a reserve in Wales. The new reserve was opened by the Minister for the Environment, John Griffiths. Caerphilly Council emphasised the "particular importance to South Wales" of the area due to its proximity to urban areas, as most reserves are typically located in more coastal or rural areas. The majority of the area has also been designated as a Special Area of Conservation under the Habitats Directive by the European Union.

== See also ==
- List of Sites of Special Scientific Interest in Mid & South Glamorgan
