= Cwm Risca Meadow =

Protected area in Glamorgan, Wales

Coordinates: 51.547485°N 3.625091°W

Cwm Risca Meadow is a Site of Special Scientific Interest in Bridgend, south Wales. It is nationally important marshy grassland supporting the marsh fritillary. It was designated in 1979.

== See also ==
- List of Sites of Special Scientific Interest in Mid & South Glamorgan
