= Wern Ddu Claypits =

Protected area in Gwent, Wales

Wern Ddu Clay Pits
- Site of Special Scientific Interest
- Location within Wales
- Location of Wern Ddu Clay Pits.
- Area of search: Gwent
- Grid reference: ST1674785684
- Coordinates: 51.563864°N 3.2024493°W
- Interest: Geology
- Area: 6.48 ha (16.0 acres)
- Notification date: 1 January 1979

Wern Ddu Claypits is a Site of Special Scientific Interest near Van in Caerphilly County Borough, South Wales. The woodland is known locally as Coed y Werin (which would mean "Folk Wood") or Coed y Wern ("Alder Wood"; sources differ, but the latter is more plausible). It surrounds a 19th-century clay pit, dug to supply clay to the Caerphilly Brick Company. It is designated because of the important coal measure rocks exposed there.

== Geography ==
The Wern Ddu Claypits are located to the west of Caerphilly town centre. The site is measures around six hectares (15 acres). The site is owned by the Caerphilly Woodland Trust and Natural Resources Wales.

== History ==
The quarry at Wern Ddu is believed to be around 150 years old. The area was the site of an opencast clay pit and a drift mine that provided material for brickmaking. In the 1920s and 1930s the site was worked by the Black Vein Colliery and later the Caerphilly Brick Company.

Production at the Claypits ceased in the 1960s and the area became largely derelict in the ensuing decades. The site was designated a Site of Special Scientific Interest on 29 October 1984, mainly due to large deposits of Carboniferous and Westphalian geology which are estimated to be up to 300 million years old. Caerphilly County Borough Council describes the area as "one of the most important sites for helping understand the Westphalian geological history of the southern province of Britain."

At the start of the 21st century, The Caerphilly Woodlands Trust took possession of the Claypits site and began developing the area. In 2007, the Countryside Council for Wales carried out an extensive clear up process to develop the site for visitors.

== See also ==
- List of Sites of Special Scientific Interest in Mid & South Glamorgan
