= Daren y Dimbath =

Protected area in Glamorgan, Wales

- Site of Special Scientific Interest
- Location within Wales
- Location of Daren y Dimbath.
- Area of search: Mid and South Glamorgan
- Grid reference: SS9524189540
- Coordinates: 51.594934°N 3.5137539°W
- Interest: Biological
- Area: 4.53 ha (11.2 acres)
- Notification date: 1 January 1979

Daren y Dimbath is a Site of Special Scientific Interest in Bridgend, south Wales.

== See also ==
- List of Sites of Special Scientific Interest in Mid & South Glamorgan
