= List of Sites of Special Scientific Interest in the Brecon Beacons National Park =

There are 83 Sites of Special Scientific Interest (SSSIs) within the Brecon Beacons National Park just under 10% of the over 1000 such designated areas in Wales as a whole. As elsewhere, the majority of sites of special scientific interest (also commonly referred to as 'SSSIs') in this National Park are designated for their flora and/or fauna (‘biological SSSIs’) whilst a lesser number are designated for their geology (‘geological SSSIs’). Others again are designated in respect of both interests and may be described as ‘mixed’. Natural Resources Wales is the body responsible for their designation and issuing consents for (or indeed refusing permission for) activities to take place within them. Most SSSIs are single contiguous areas though a handful comprise two or more separate parcels of land (see 'sections' column in table below).

The National Park stretches across parts of seven separate principal areas (counties or county boroughs of Blaenau Gwent, Caerphilly, Carmarthenshire, Merthyr Tydfil, Monmouthshire, Powys and Rhondda Cynon Taf) and there are SSSIs within the National Park sectors of each of them except for Caerphilly. A few SSSIs straddle the boundaries between two or three of these principal areas. Some also straddle the boundary of the National Park and may extend into other council areas such as Neath Port Talbot.

SSSI name	Principal area	interest	sections
Abercriban Quarries	Merthyr Tydfil County Borough	geological	1
Afon Wysg (isafonydd) / River Usk (tributaries)	Powys	biological	several
Alexanderstone Meadows	Powys	biological	1
Baltic & Tyle'r-bont Quarries	Merthyr Tydfil County Borough	geological	1
Black Mountains	Powys	biological	1
Blaen Nedd	Powys	mixed	1
Blorenge	Monmouthshire	biological	1
Boxbush Meadows	Powys	biological	1
Brecon Beacons	Powys	mixed	2
Bryn-bwch	Powys	biological	1
Buckland Coach House & Ice House	Powys	biological	1
Cae Bryn-tywarch	Powys	biological	1
Cae Cilmaenllwyd	Carmarthenshire	biological	1
Cae Gwernllertai	Powys	biological	1
Cae Maes-y-ffynnon	Carmarthenshire	biological	1
Caeau Cwmcoynant	Powys	biological	1
Caeau fferm	Powys	biological	1
Caeau Nant y Llechau	Powys	biological	1
Caeau Pant-y-bryn	Carmarthenshire	biological	1
Caeau Tir-mawr	Carmarthenshire	biological	1
Caeau Ton-y-fildre	Powys / Neath Port Talbot	biological	1
Caeau Ty-mawr	Powys	biological	1
Carreg Cennen	Carmarthenshire	biological	1
Cathedine Common Wood	Powys	biological	1
Coed Blaen-y-cwm	Powys	biological	1
Coed Llandyfan	Carmarthenshire	biological	1
Coed Mawr Blaen-car	Powys	biological	2
Coed Nant Menasgin	Powys	biological	1
Coed y Cerrig	Monmouthshire	biological	1
Coedydd Tregyb/Tregib Woodlands	Carmarthenshire	biological	1
Coed-y-person	Monmouthshire	biological	1
Craig y Rhiwarth	Powys	mixed	1
Cwar Glas Quarry & Sawdde Gorge	Carmarthenshire	geological	1
Cwm Cadlan	Rhondda Cynon Taf	biological	1
Cwm Clydach	Monmouthshire	mixed	1
Cwm Llanwenarth Meadows	Monmouthshire	biological	1
Cwm Taf Fechan Woodlands	Merthyr Tydfil County Borough	biological	2
Daren Fach	Merthyr Tydfil County Borough	biological	1
Dyffrynoedd Nedd a Mellte a Moel Penderyn	Neath Port Talbot / Powys / Rhondda Cynon Taf	mixed	3
Foxwood	Monmouthshire	biological	1
Gilwern Hill	Monmouthshire	mixed	1
Gweunydd Dyffryn Nedd	Powys	biological	1
Gyfartha	Powys	biological	1
Henallt Common	Powys	biological	1
Heol Senni Quarry	Powys	geological	1
Illtyd Pools	Powys	mixed	2
Llanfihangel Moraine	Monmouthshire	geological	1
Llanover Quarry	Monmouthshire	geological	1
Llyn Syfaddan (Llangorse Lake)	Powys	biological	1
Mandinam a Coed Deri	Carmarthenshire	biological	3
Mynydd Du (Black Mountain)	Carmarthenshire / Powys	mixed	1
Mynyddoedd Llangynidr a Llangatwg, Cefn yr Ystrad a Chomin Merthyr	Blaenau Gwent / Caerphilly / Merthyr Tydfil / Monmouthshire / Powys	mixed	several
Nant Glais Caves	Merthyr Tydfil County Borough	geological	1
Nant Llech	Powys	mixed	1
Ogof Ffynnon Ddu	Powys	mixed	1
Ogof Ffynnon Ddu - Pant Mawr	Powys	mixed	1
Penmoelallt	Rhondda Cynon Taf	biological	1
Pen-y-craig goch	Carmarthenshire	biological	1
Pen-yr-Hen-allt	Powys	biological	1
Plas-y-gors	Powys	biological	1
Pwll-yr-wrach	Powys	biological	2
Rhos Cruglas	Carmarthenshire	geological	1
Rhos hen-glyn-isaf	Powys	biological	1
River Usk (Lower Usk)/Afon Wysg (Wysg isaf)	Monmouthshire	biological	1
River Usk (Upper Usk)/ Afon Wysg (Wysg uchaf)	Carmarthenshire / Powys	biological	1
River Wye (Upper Wye)	Powys	biological	1
Siambre ddu	Monmouthshire	mixed	1
Strawberry Cottage Wood	Monmouthshire	biological	1
Sugar Loaf Woodlands	Monmouthshire	biological	3
Tir Mawr a Dderi Hir, Llwydcoed	Rhondda Cynon Taf	biological	1
Waun Ton-y-spyddaden	Powys	biological	1
Waun-ddu	Carmarthenshire	biological	1
Woodland Park & Pontpren	Rhondda Cynon Taf	biological	3
Y Gors	Powys	biological	1
Ydw Valley & Fron Road Geological exposures	Carmarthenshire	geological	5

== Former SSSIs ==
The following ceased to exist when they were superseded by the designation in 2025 of the much larger Mynyddoedd Llangynidr a Llangatwg, Cefn yr Ystrad a Chomin Merthyr SSSI.

SSSI name	Principal area	interest	sections
Cwar yr Ystrad a Cwar Blaen Dyffryn	Powys	geological	2
Mynydd Llangatwg	Blaenau Gwent / Monmouthshire / Powys	mixed	1
Mynydd Llangynidr	Blaenau Gwent / Powys	geological	1

== Other websites ==
Natural Resources Wales provides a search facility for protected areas in the country on its website.
