= Ewenny and Pant Quarries =

Protected area in Glamorgan, Wales

Coordinates: 51.4777°N 3.5805°W

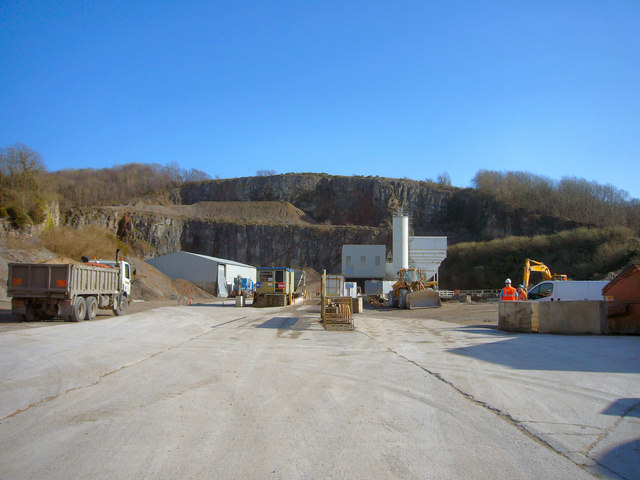
Ewenny Quarry

Ewenny and Pant Quarries is a Site of Special Scientific Interest in the Vale of Glamorgan, south Wales, notable for its geological interest. First designated in 1996, both quarries are active, commercial quarries, with no public access. Ewenny Quarry is operated by Lafarge Aggregates and Pant Quarry, just over the community border in St Brides Major community, is operated by Tarmac Group. A third quarry, Lithalun Quarry (operated by Hanson plc) is not part of the SSSI, but has also produced important fossilised remains.

Jurassic clay infill, around 200 million years ago accumulated in deep fissures in the already weathered landscape of the Carboniferous limestone. Along with the clay, individuals of several species of very primitive mammals ended up with their remains amongst this clay, which then fossilised. Now, as the limestone is quarried at these two sites the clay infill is stored and subsequently examined by geologists. These infills have provided the most complete fossilised remains of species of primitive mammals anywhere on earth. Morganucodon watsoni is the earliest and most primitive prototherian mammal known. Reconstruction of teeth and jaw fragments suggests they could have fed on 'hard' insects such as beetles. Kuehneotherium praecursoris, classed as the most primitive therian mammal known, by contrast, could only manage 'soft' insects such as moths.

== See also ==
- List of Sites of Special Scientific Interest in Mid & South Glamorgan
