= Woodland Park and Pontpren =

Protected area in Glamorgan, Wales

Coordinates: 51.75639°N 3.52374°W

Woodland Park and Pontpren is a Site of Special Scientific Interest in Rhondda Cynon Taf, south Wales. The site consists of three separate blocks of land, approximately 1 km (0.62 mi) south of the village of Penderyn.

The Countryside Council for Wales states that the site has been categorised as a Site of Special Interest "...for the Marsh Fritillary butterfly. Additional special interest is provided by its mixture of habitat types, including marshy grassland, dry acid and neutral grassland, heathland and woodland, which add to the ecological and biodiversity interest of the site and which also provide food and shelter necessary for the survival of the Marsh Fritillary."

== See also ==
- List of SSSIs in Mid & South Glamorgan
