= Rumney Quarry =

Protected area in Glamorgan, Wales

Coordinates: 51.502838°N 3.132722°W

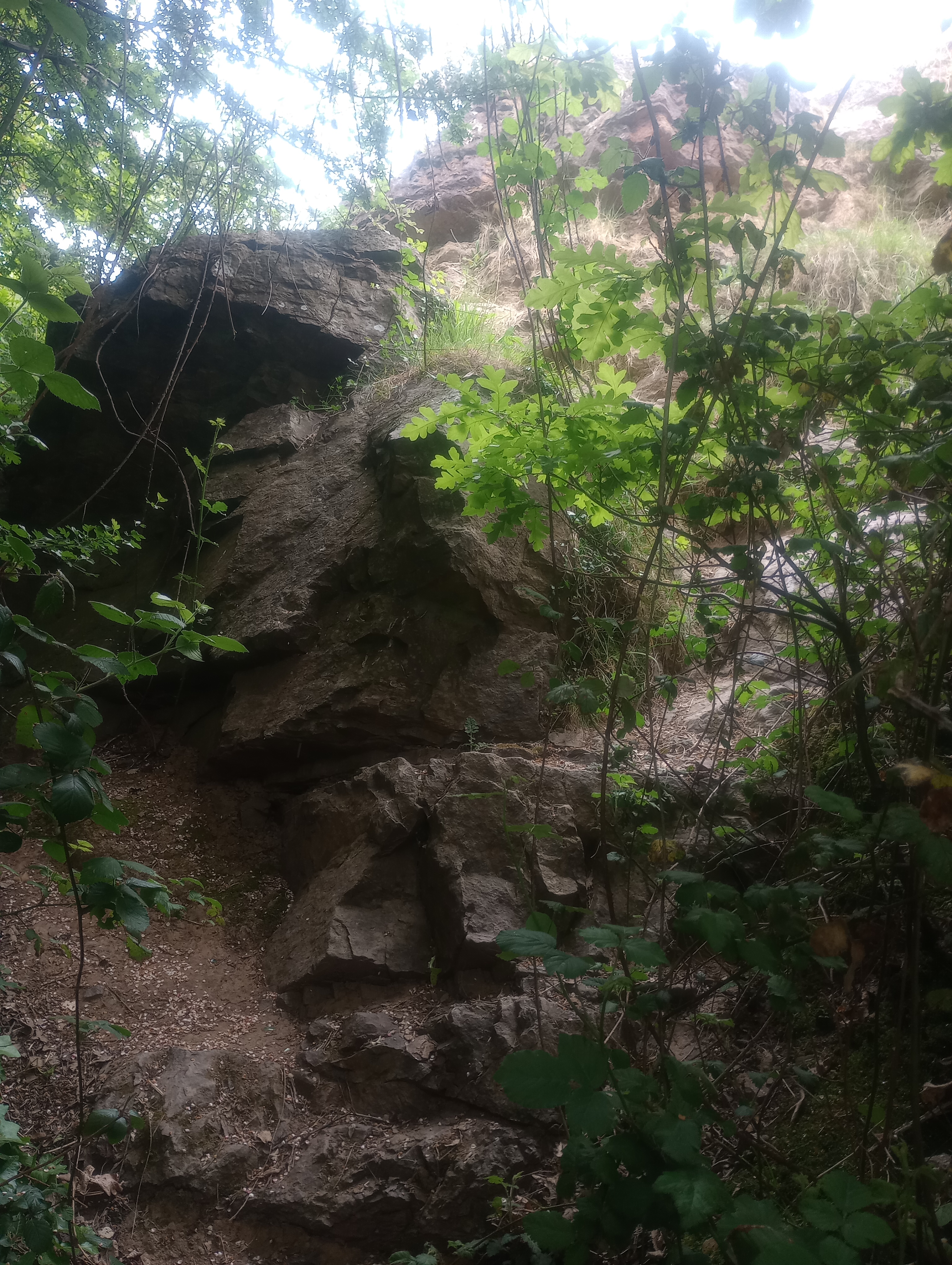
Rumney Quarry

Rhymney Quarry is a Site of Special Scientific Interest in Rumney, Cardiff, Wales.

The area is a disused quarry which shows facies of the Wenlock Group. The quarry was opened in the 19th century and the stone was used for roads before closing in the 1920s.

== See also ==
- List of Sites of Special Scientific Interest in Mid & South Glamorgan
