= Cwm Glo =

Protected area in Glamorgan, Wales

Cwm Glo a Glyndyrys
- Site of Special Scientific Interest
- Location within Wales
- Location of Cwm Glo a Glyndyrys.
- Area of search: Mid and South Glamorgan
- Grid reference: SO0378605227
- Coordinates: 51.737463°N 3.3947593°W
- Interest: Biological
- Area: 181.31 ha (448.0 acres)
- Notification date: 23 January 2003

Cwm Glo a Glyndyrys is a Site of Special Scientific Interest in Merthyr Tydfil, south Wales.

== See also ==
- List of Sites of Special Scientific Interest in Mid & South Glamorgan
