= Nash Lighthouse Meadow =

Protected area in Glamorgan, Wales

Coordinates: 51.400853°N 3.554098°W

Nash Lighthouse Meadow is a Site of Special Scientific Interest near St Donats in the Vale of Glamorgan, south Wales. It is 1.6 hectares in area, along the coastline, and includes the Nash Point Lighthouse.

== See also ==
- List of Sites of Special Scientific Interest in Mid & South Glamorgan
