= Cwm Du Woodlands =

Protected area in Glamorgan, Wales

Cwm Du Woodlands is a Site of Special Scientific Interest in Bridgend, south Wales.

The Countryside Council for Wales states that the site has been categorised as a Site of Special Interest for "...its Sessile Oak woodland, typical of western Britain.."

== See also ==
- List of Sites of Special Scientific Interest in Mid & South Glamorgan
