= Nant Whitton Woodlands =

Protected area in Glamorgan, Wales

Coordinates: 51.4347°N 3.3508°W

Nant Whitton Woodlands is a Site of Special Scientific Interest in Vale of Glamorgan, south Wales. The site is a narrow strip of woodland on a Liassic limestone slope in the Vale of Glamorgan. The villages of Llanvithyn and Walterston are nearby.

The SSSI includes the Coed Garnllwyd nature reserve.

== See also ==
- List of Sites of Special Scientific Interest in Mid & South Glamorgan
