= Cog Moors =

Protected area in Glamorgan, Wales

Cog Moors is a Site of Special Scientific Interest in Glamorgan, south Wales.

== See also ==
- List of Sites of Special Scientific Interest in Mid & South Glamorgan
