= Stormy Down =

Protected area in Glamorgan, Wales

Coordinates: 51.51°N 3.66°W

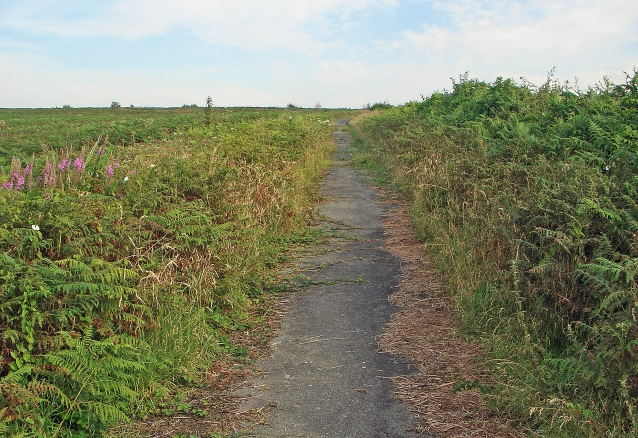
Disused lane on Stormy Down

Stormy Down is a Site of Special Scientific Interest flanking the M4 motorway near Pyle in Bridgend County Borough, South Wales. During World War Two, an aerodrome has been there.

== See also ==
- List of Sites of Special Scientific Interest in Mid & South Glamorgan
- RAF Stormy Down
