= Cors Bryn-y-Gaer =

Protected area in Glamorgan, Wales

Cors Bryn-y-Gaer is a Site of Special Scientific Interest near Hirwaun in Rhondda Cynon Taf, South Wales.

== See also ==
- List of Sites of Special Scientific Interest in Mid & South Glamorgan
