= Penylan =

District and community of Cardiff, Wales

Coordinates: 51.500°N 3.161°W

- Community
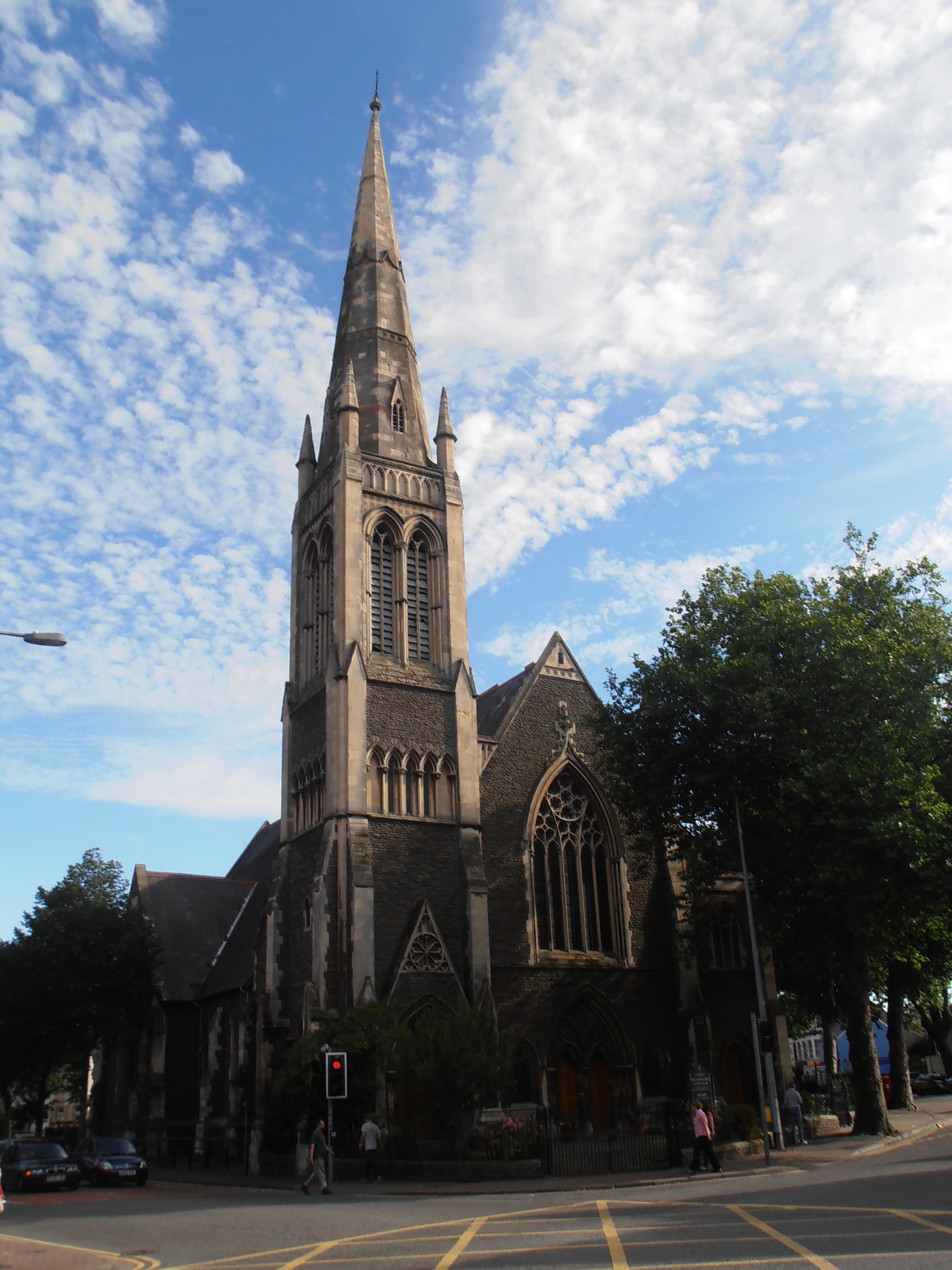
- St Andrew's Church

- Location within Cardiff
- Principal area: Cardiff
- Country: Wales
- Sovereign state: United Kingdom
- Police: South Wales
- Fire: South Wales
- Ambulance: Welsh
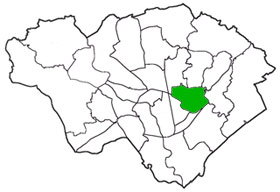
- List of places UK Wales Cardiff

Penylan is a district and community in the east of Cardiff, the capital city of Wales, known for its Edwardian era period houses and spacious tree lined roads and avenues.

Situated to both the north and south of the A48 dual carriageway, it is one of the most affluent districts of Cardiff, although subdivision of the large Victorian period properties is starting to occur in the areas at the south end of the ward, mimicking the trend in neighbouring Plasnewydd.

Penylan has a number of large parks, including the southern part of Roath Park, and is one of the greenest areas in Cardiff. It is served by Penylan Library.

Penylan Synagogue was opened in 1955, and closed in 2003 when a new synagogue had been built in nearby Cyncoed Gardens.

== Governance ==
Penylan is both an electoral ward, and a community of the City of Cardiff. There is no community council for the area. The electoral ward of Penylan falls within the parliamentary constituency of Cardiff East. It is bounded by the wards of Cyncoed to the northwest; Pentwyn to the north; Llanrumney to the northeast; Rumney to the east; Splott to the southeast; Adamsdown to the south; and Plasnewydd to the southwest.

A proposal to amend the ward boundaries for the creation of a new ward 'Ty Gwyn' north of the A48 will not be carried forward.

== Landmarks ==
- Waterloo Gardens Shops [Sands Hairdressers, Lifestyle Stores, Post Office, Waterloo Gardens Tea House]
- Numerous parks
- Penylan Library
- Roath Church House and Scout Hall
- St Andrews United Reformed Church, Roath
- St Margaret's Parish Church
- Marlborough Primary School
- Penylan Quarry
- Melrose Apartments
