= Ty Du Moor =

Protected area in Glamorgan, Wales

Coordinates: 51.505602°N 3.288303°W

Ty Du Moor is a Site of Special Scientific Interest in Glamorgan, south Wales.

== See also ==
- List of Sites of Special Scientific Interest in Mid & South Glamorgan
