= Cwm Cadlan =

Protected area in Glamorgan, Wales

- Site of Special Scientific Interest
- Location within Wales
- Location of Cwm Cadlan.
- Area of search: Mid and South Glamorgan
- Grid reference: SN9616809850
- Coordinates: 51.777653°N 3.5064251°W
- Interest: Biological
- Area: 84.2 ha (208 acres)
- Notification date: 1 January 1972

Cwm Cadlan is a Site of Special Scientific Interest in Glamorgan, south Wales. It is made up of a series of wet grassland fields in a small valley to the north west of Merthyr Tydfil. It is also designated as a Special Area of Conservation (SAC) and a National Nature Reserve (NNR).

== See also ==
- List of Sites of Special Scientific Interest in Mid & South Glamorgan
