= Cwm Cydfin, Leckwith =

Protected area in Glamorgan, Wales

Cwm Cydfin, Leckwith is a Site of Special Scientific Interest in Glamorgan, South Wales. It is a mixed deciduous woodland near the village of Leckwith, near the River Ely on the outskirts of Cardiff.

== See also ==
- List of Sites of Special Scientific Interest in Mid & South Glamorgan
