= Llantrisant Guildhall =

Municipal Building in Llantrisant, Wales

- Neuadd y Dref Llantrisant (Welsh)
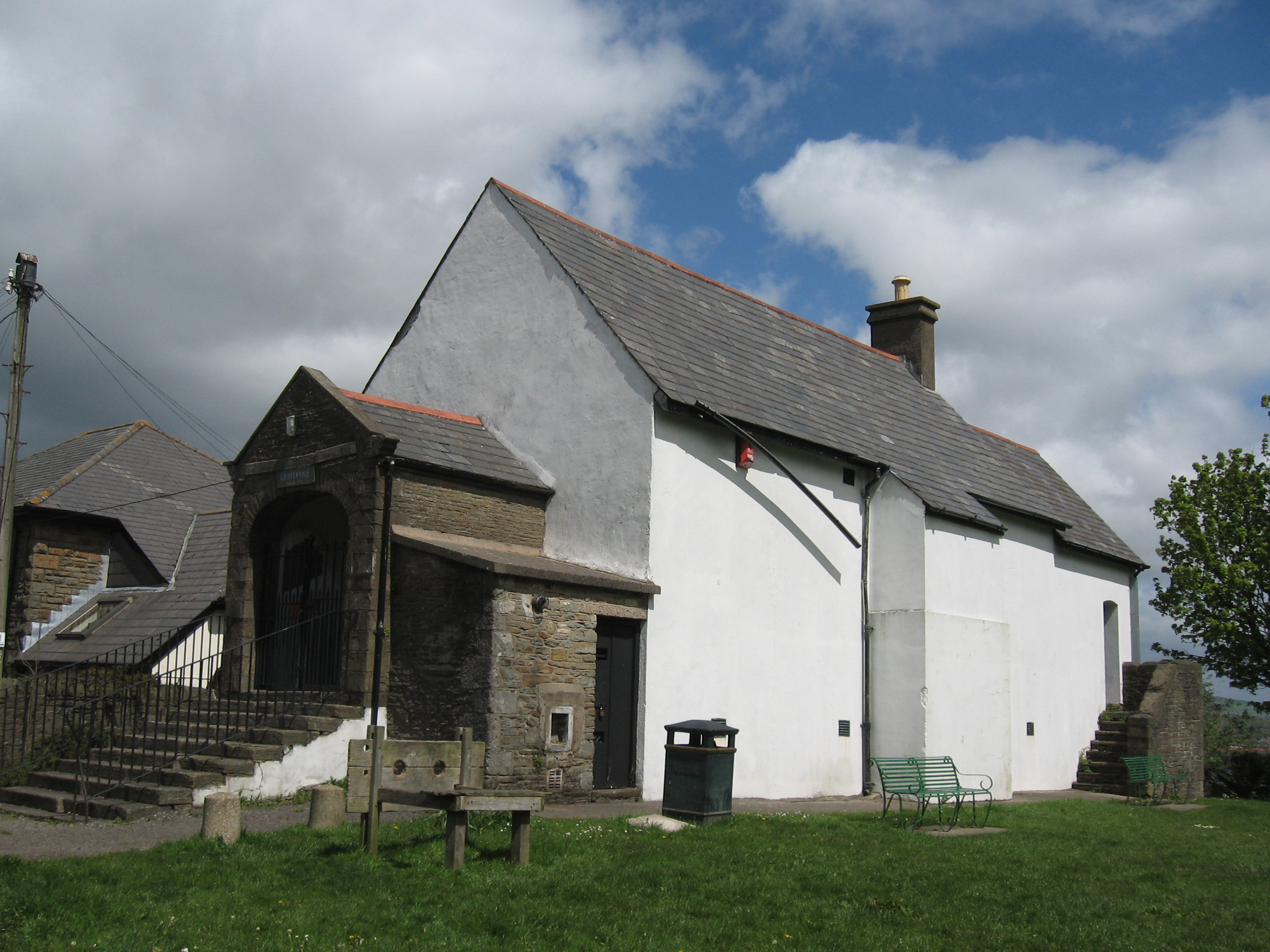
- Llantrisant Guildhall

- Shown in Rhondda Cynon Taf
- 51.5419°N 3.3751°W
- Location: Castle Green, Llantrisant

History
- Built: 1773

Site notes
- Architectural style: Georgian style

Listed Building – Grade II
- Official name: The Guildhall
- Designated: 18 August 2000
- Reference no.: 23943

Llantrisant Guildhall (Welsh: Neuadd y Dref Llantrisant) is a municipal building on Castle Green, Llantrisant, Rhondda Cynon Taf, Wales. The structure, which is used as a visitor centre, is a Grade II listed building.

== History ==
A charter incorporating the borough was presented by the Lord of Glamorgan, Hugh le Despenser, Baron le Despenser, to the freemen of the town in 1346, and an early guildhall was erected on the north side of Castle Green at around that time. A school was established in the guildhall in 1739.

After the first guildhall became very dilapidated, the lady of the manor, Lady Charlotte Jane Windsor, agreed to provide financial support. The current building was commissioned by her husband, John Stuart, Lord Mount Stuart, who was styled, on the commemoration stone, as Baron Cardiff. The building was designed in the Georgian style, built using rubble masonry with a cement render finish and was completed in 1773. It formed one of four sides of the Market Square with stalls erected on the other three sides. The design of the building followed a rectangular layout, which narrowed at the east end. It was fenestrated by four segmental-headed sash windows with window sills on the north side, and there was a prominent porch at the west end. The porch, which was not rendered, featured a short flight of steps leading up to a segmental headed opening with voussoirs and iron gates, surmounted by a triangular pediment. Both the porch and the main structure were covered by a slate roof. Internally, the principal rooms were a corn exchange on the ground floor and a courtroom on the first floor.

There was also a prison cell, for incarcerating petty criminals, in the basement, but the use of the prison cell was discontinued when a police station was established in Swan Street in 1840. The borough council, administered by a court leet which met in the courtroom, was abolished under the Municipal Corporations Act 1883. At that time the building remained in the ownership of John Crichton-Stuart, 3rd Marquess of Bute. The other assets of the borough were transferred to the newly formed Llantrisant Town Trust in 1889. The use of the ground floor room as a corn exchange declined significantly in the wake of the Great Depression of British Agriculture in the late 19th century, and that area was converted into a library and reading room in 1896.

A plaque to commemorate the life of the former Lord Mayor of London, Sir David Evans, who was born locally, was installed on the south wall of the building shortly after he died in 1907. Llantrisant & Llantwit Fardre Rural District Council, which had been established in 1894, acquired the building from the Crichton-Stuart family and sold it on to the Llantrisant Town Trust in 1956.

An extensive programme of restoration works, which involved converting the building into a visitor centre, was completed at a cost of £1.1 million, in 2019. Organisations providing financial support included the Heritage Lottery Fund, Cadw, the Garfield Weston Foundation and Llantrisant Community Council. Items placed on display include a silver ceremonial mace dating to the 17th century. The Prince of Wales and Duchess of Cornwall visited the guildhall to see the completed visitor centre in July 2021.
