= Llantrisant Common and Pastures =

Protected area in Glamorgan, Wales

- IUCN category IV (habitat/species management area)
- Location within Wales
- Location: Llantrisant, Rhondda Cynon Taf
- Coordinates: 51°32′32″N 3°22′43″W
- Area: 113 ha (280 acres)
- Established: 2000

Llantrisant Common and Pastures is a 113-hectare (280-acre) Site of Special Scientific Interest in Llantrisant, Rhondda Cynon Taf, south Wales. It was established in 2000.

The Countryside Council for Wales states that the site has been categorized as a Site of Special Interest for "...its extensive area of acidic marshy grassland in a lowland setting, as well as for smaller areas of species-rich neutral grassland, dry acidic grassland and flush. It is also of special interest for populations of two rare plants: Cornish moneywort (Sibthorpia europaea) and a liverwort known as bog earwort (Scapania paludicola).

== See also ==
- List of Sites of Special Scientific Interest in Mid & South Glamorgan
