= Nant Gelliwion Woodland =

Protected area in Glamorgan, Wales

Nant Gelliwion Woodland is a Site of Special Scientific Interest in Glamorgan, south Wales.

== See also ==
- List of Sites of Special Scientific Interest in Mid & South Glamorgan
