= Lower House Stream Section =

Protected area in Glamorgan, Wales

Lower House Stream Section is a Site of Special Scientific Interest in the Rhymney Valley, in Caerphilly County Borough, south Wales.

The stream is just south of the Lower House Reservoir and is 3 kilometres (1.9 miles) north of Rhymney. The geological interest of the site centres on the best exposure of the Middle Shales Formation, part of the South Wales Coalfield, in south Wales. The exposed sequence is just under 3 metres (9.8 ft) thick, at the top is a 75 centimetres (2.46 ft) layer of cross-bedded sandstone which overlies 2 metres (6.6 ft) of shales and a thin layer of limestone. The upper part of the shales is marine in origin and they are part of a formation known as the Cancellatum Marine Band. This band contains many fossils, particularly uncrushed examples of the ammonite Cancellocerus cancellatum but also of brachiopods, bivalves and fragments of crinoids. Other sites where these rocks are exposed in south Wales are not as fossiliferous as the Lower House Stream Section. The band of marine sediments here is also significant in that it marks the boundary between two geological ages of the Carboniferous, the Yeadonian and the Marsdenian and was laid down 310 million years ago.

As this site marks the boundary between the Marsdenian and Yeadonian stages of the Namurian and a full understanding of a rock strata's faunal composition is vital to its correct identification it therefore has an important role in establishing detailed correlations where there are Namurian sediments, for example the Pennines, Belgium and the Ruhr. The site was designated a Site of Special Scientific Interest for its geological and geomorphological value. The Lower House Stream Section has also been designated as a Regionally Important Geological/ Geomorphological site (RIGS).

== See also ==
- List of Sites of Special Scientific Interest in Mid & South Glamorgan
