= Waun-fawr, Cefn Cribwr =

Protected area in Glamorgan, Wales

- Site of Special Scientific Interest
- Location within Wales
- Location of Waun-fawr, Cefn Cribwr.
- Area of search: Mid and South Glamorgan
- Grid reference: SS8566981774
- Coordinates: 51.523272°N 3.6493536°W
- Interest: Biological
- Area: 9.19 ha (22.7 acres)
- Notification date: 4 December 2000

Waun-fawr, Cefn Cribwr is a Site of Special Scientific Interest in Glamorgan, south Wales.

== See also ==
- List of Sites of Special Scientific Interest in Mid & South Glamorgan
