= Penmoelallt =

Site of Special Scientific Interest in Wales

Coordinates: 51.774°N 3.450°W

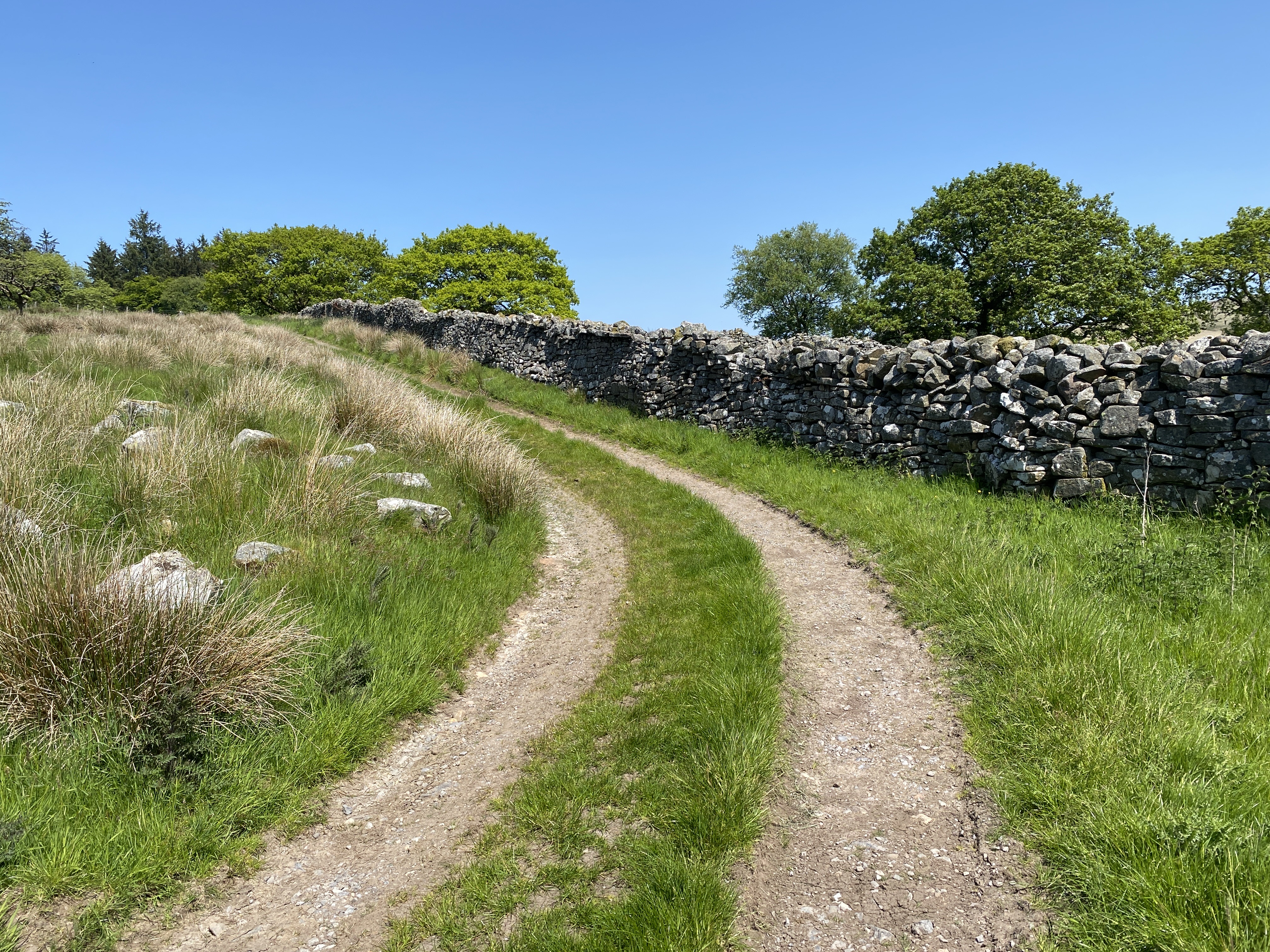
Track towards Penmoelallt

Penmoelallt or Onllwyn is a hill in the northern part of the county borough of Rhondda Cynon Taff in south Wales. It lies within the Brecon Beacons National Park and Fforest Fawr Geopark. To its east lies the deep valley of Cwm Taf and to its north a rather shallower valley in which the Nant Cadlan originates. To the west is the hill known as Mynydd-y-glog and to the south are slopes draining into the River Taff and the Afon Cynon. The hill culminates in a broken plateau with several knolls rising above the 420m contour. Its afforested nature makes it difficult to determine the precise location of its highest point but this probably lies somewhere around OS grid ref SO 003096. Older maps indicate a spot height of 1376 ft above sea level at SO 000090.

== Geology ==
Penmoelallt is composed of a layer cake of rocks laid down during the Carboniferous period and subsequently tilted to the south into the South Wales Coalfield basin. Lowermost, and exposed along its northern and eastern scarps, are Carboniferous Limestones. Above these are the coarse sandstones of the Twrch sandstone (formerly the 'Basal Grit') of the Marros Group (former 'Millstone Grit Series') whilst the southernmost slopes are formed in the lowermost beds of the Lower South Wales Coal Measures. A couple of northwest to southeast aligned faults runs across the hill. The limestone gives rise to karstic scenery including numerous shakeholes some of which occur on the gritstone area as well as the limestone. There are a number of areas of gritstone pavement though most are obscured by trees.

== Access ==
The hill is almost entirely clothed by a coniferous plantation managed by the Natural Resources Wales, who have dedicated their entire freehold estate as access land for walkers. Numerous vehicular tracks (without vehicular access for the public) run through the forest. A few public rights of way cross through the forest, though some are difficult to access. Much of the bridleway between Ffrwd Uchaf and Pen-twyn-isaf serves as a forest track and provides ready access from Cwm Taf, as does the footpath which carries the Taff Trail between the same locations.

== Ley's whitebeam ==
The Welsh endemic tree species Ley's whitebeam (Sorbus leyana) grows at Penmoelallt, one of the only two sites where this species grows wild.
