= Cliff Wood – Golden Stairs =

Protected area in Glamorgan, Wales

Cliff Wood – Golden Stairs is a Site of Special Scientific Interest in the Vale of Glamorgan, south Wales.

The Countryside Council for Wales states that the site has been categorised as a Site of Special Interest because it is "...an example of mixed deciduous woodland with a canopy of oak, ash, field maple and yew. It is also of special interest for two rare plant species: Purple Gromwell, which grows at the edge of the wood, and the True Service-tree."

== See also ==
- List of Sites of Special Scientific Interest in Mid & South Glamorgan
