= Llantrisant Castle =

Castle in the United Kingdom

Coordinates: 51.5416°N 3.3747°W

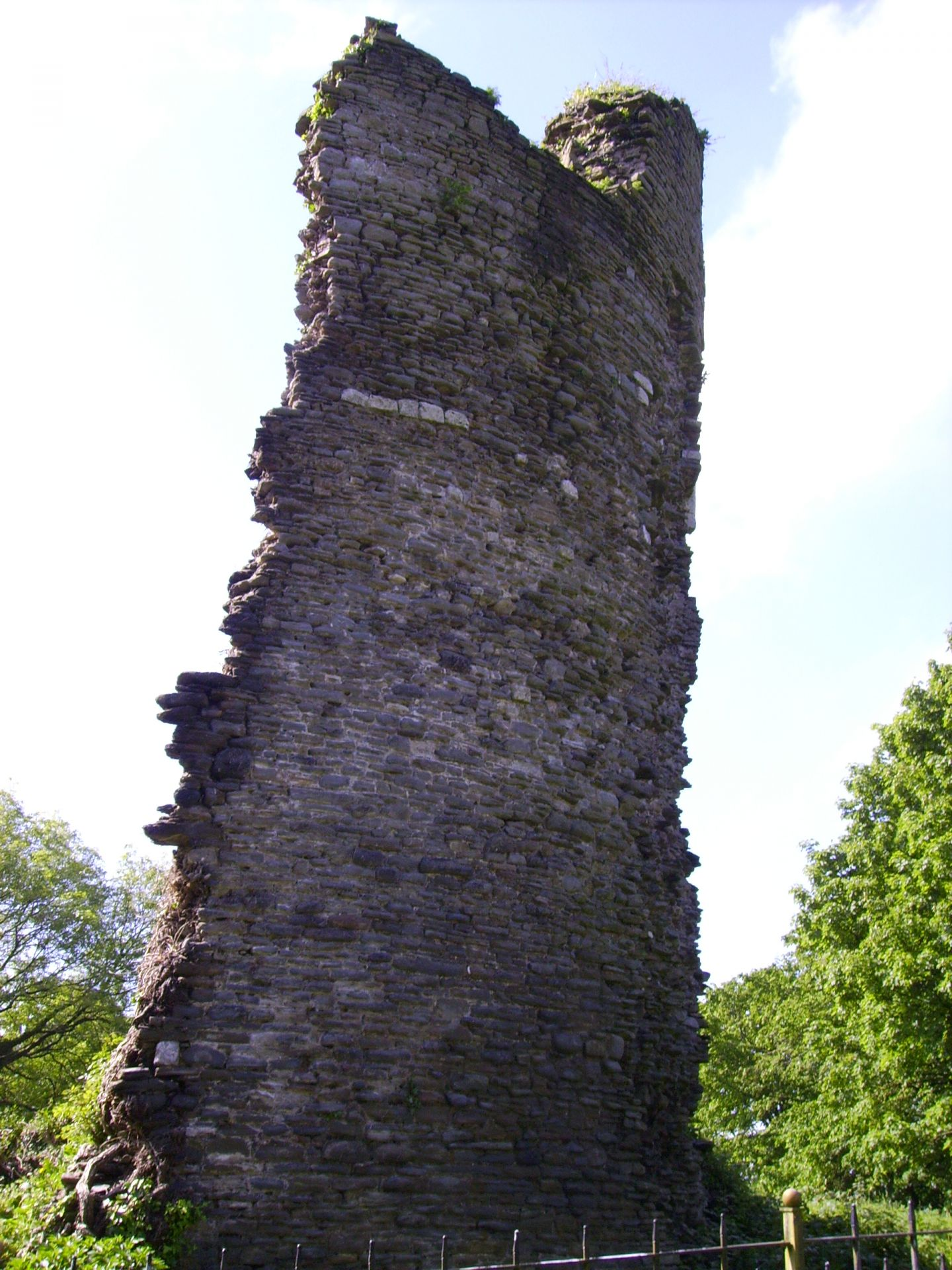
Llantrisant Castle ruins

Llantrisant Castle is a ruined castle in Llantrisant, Rhondda Cynon Taf, Glamorgan, Wales. The ruins are on a good elevation, commanding extensive views of the surrounding country. It has the appearance of once occupying a formidable position of defense. Now only a portion of a tower and some outer walls remain standing and neglected. Its origin being ascribed to different dates. During what period and by whom this and several other castles in Wales were erected, has not been determined.

== History ==
Sem Phillips, in his book, The History of the Borough of Llantrisant, Glamorganshire, and Its Neighbourhood, mentions "that taking everything into consideration it seems most probably to have been erected by Gwrgan ab Ithel (Lord of Glamorgan), and repaired, if not rebuilt, by Einion ab Collwyn after the invasion of Fitzhamon." Many antiquaries assert that the above opinion is inconsistent. In the time of Edward I, the castle, undoubtedly, was in possession of Gilbert de Clare, commonly called the Red Lord of Glamorgan, who did homage to Edward on his accession to the titles and estates of his family after the death of his father. Rice Meyrick, in his book of Glamorgan Antiquities, 1578, mentions—" It is said that Earl Robert Galfridus Monemutensis built the castle of Llantrisant in the time Sir Robert Morris was Sheriffe of Glamorgan." Stowe in his History of England mentions Robert Consul or Robert of Caen, son of Henry I, who married Mable, Amable or Mabilla, a daughter of the Norman Knight, Robert Fitzhamon, built the Castle of Llantrisant, the Priory of St. James, and the Castle of Bristol. G. T. Clark in his Land of Morgan (pp. 36, 47-8), refers to Llantrisant Castle, and mentions "Earl Robert, who is known to have built Bristol Castle, is reported to have built that of Cardiff." "Earl Robert seems to have built a castle at Llantrisant, and the accounts of the Lordship in 1184 shows that the Castles Newport, Kenfig and Neath were at that time regularly established fortresses."

This appears to be a period when many castles in Glamorgan were built, and many strong places to have been renewed. The present fragments of masonry comparing with other places of that age. There is no certainty for how long a period the castle was used as a residence.

We find an account of writs issued 15 July 1297, to Walter de Hacklut, custos, to complete the gate of the Castle of Llantrisant which he had begun. After the death of Earl Gilbert in 1314, the Earl's executors had a writ to give seizen to the heirs, 15 July 1317. Bartholomew de Badlesmere was in charge of Glamorgan, and all the officers of the lordship were to have the same fees as in the time of the Earl, also he is to store the castles. In 1315, reference is made to Llantrisant Castle, when a William Fleming was given the custody of the Castle and the Forest of Miskin as Bailiff. Afterwards he fell under the king's displeasure, and was executed in Cardiff for treason. In the year 1404, we find the widow of Thomas, Earl of Glo'ster, a daughter of Edmund of Langley, was allowed her dower, which included the Castles of Neath, Llantrisant, and Kenfig, afterwards seized by Henry the Fifth.

From this time to the year 1533 there seems to be but very little account of the Castle. "After the rebellion there was great discontent in Glamorgan, which broke out under the leadership of Llewellyn Bren, a land-owner on the left bank of the Taff, in the hill country. The Sheriffs of Gloucester and Somerset and John de Wysham, constable of St. Brariels, were to provide men and victuals for a force to put down the rising, and Stephen le Blund is to provide the money. Feb. 13th, 1316. Humphrey de Bohun was to take the command. Peace was at once restored. Bohun was ordered to send Llewellyn Bren, his wife, and two sons, Griffith and Gevan, to the Tower, where they still remain. June, 1317. Wm. de Montacute, Hy. de Penbrugge, and Robert de Grundon were to sit and take fines in Glamorgan for the breach of the laws. Bail was taken for Llewilina, wife of Llewellyn."

Some suppose that at the time of this disturbance the Castle of Llantrisant was demolished. It is certain that Llewellyn destroyed several castles in Glamorgan. Amongst the number the Castles of St. Georges, Sully; Tregaron, Barry; Foulkes, Fitzwain; St. Athan, Ruthyn, and many others. He killed such numbers of English and Normans that no Englishman could be found who would so much as entertain the idea of remaining in Glamorgan.

== Grounds ==
To all appearance the Castle had two large parks known as the gay pigs the names of the farm houses still existing confirm this.

== Bibliography ==
- Morgan, Taliesin (1898). History of Llantrisant, Glamorganshire. Clements and Company.
