= Llantrisant =

Town in Rhondda Cynon Taf, Wales

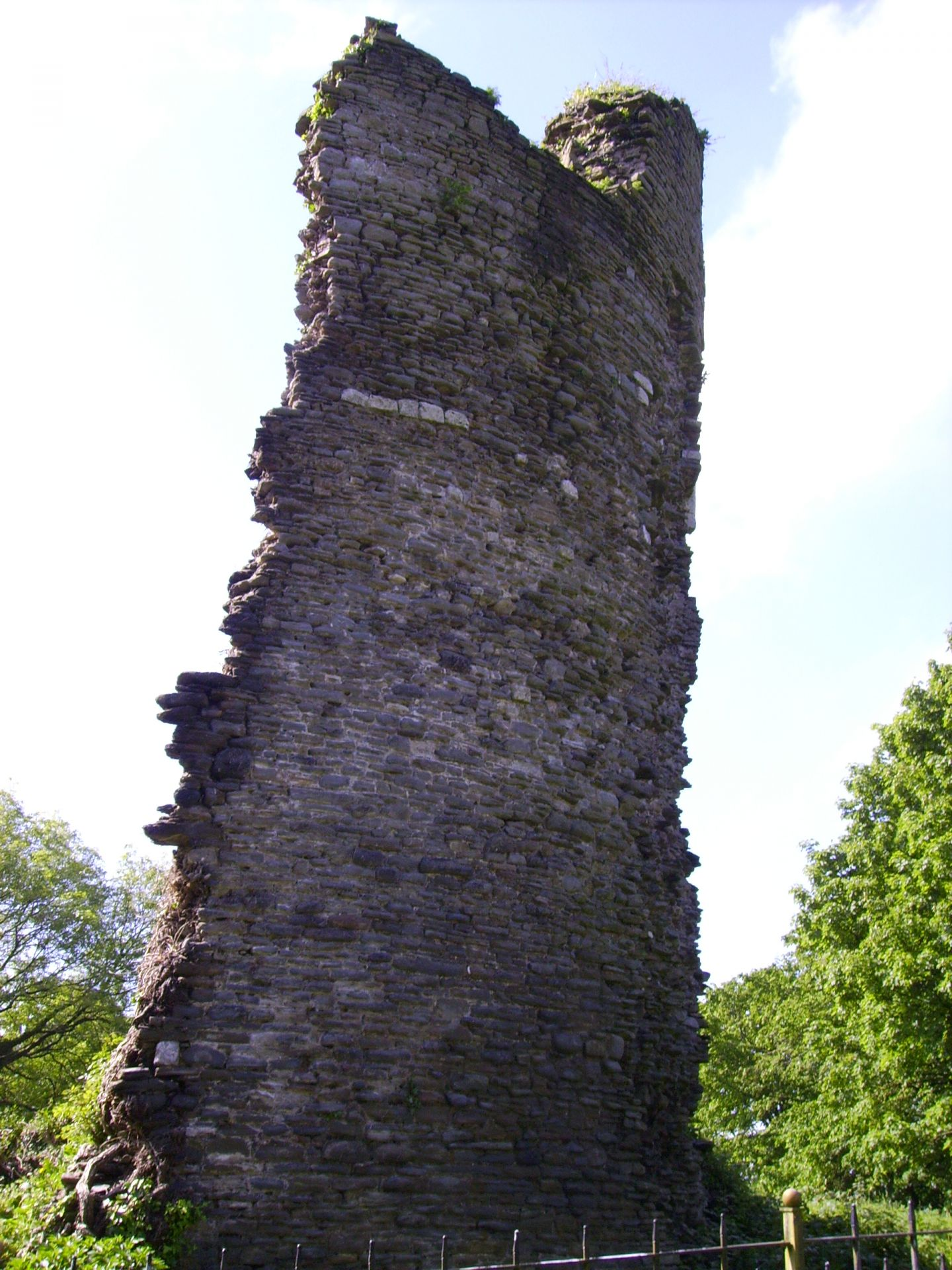
- Llantrisant Castle ruins

- Location within Rhondda Cynon Taf
- Population: 15,313 (2011)
- OS grid reference: ST045835
- Community: Llantrisant
- Principal area: Rhondda Cynon Taf
- Preserved county: Mid Glamorgan
- Country: Wales
- Sovereign state: United Kingdom
- Post town: PONTYPRIDD
- Postcode district: CF38
- Post town: PONTYCLUN
- Postcode district: CF72
- Dialling code: 01443
- Police: South Wales
- Fire: South Wales
- Ambulance: Welsh
- UK Parliament: Pontypridd
- Senedd Cymru – Welsh Parliament: Pontypridd
- List of places UK Wales Rhondda Cynon Taf 51.542°N 3.375°W Community map: Map of the community

Llantrisant (Welsh pronunciation: [ɬanˈtrɪsant]; "Parish of the Three Saints") is a town and community in the county borough of Rhondda Cynon Taf, Wales. It lies within the historic county boundaries of Glamorgan, on the River Ely and the Afon Clun. The three saints of the town's name are Illtyd, Gwynno, and Dyfodwg. Llantrisant is a hilltop settlement, at an altitude of 174 m (571 ft) above sea level. The town is home to the Royal Mint.

== History ==
There is evidence for settlements in and around Llantrisant stretching back over three millennia. Two Bronze Age burial mounds are on Mynydd Garthmaelwg, the opposite side of the Ely Valley. A 1.05 metres (3 ft 5 in) tall, by 1.68 metres (5 ft 6 in) wide, possibly Bronze Age, standing stone, was discovered in Miskin during excavations prior to the M4 motorway construction. An Iron Age hillfort stands on Rhiwsaeson Hill. The enclosure, now known as Caerau Hillfort, measures 230 metres (750 ft) by 180 metres (590 ft).

A settlement has existed on this site from at least the beginning of the 6th century, when the poet Aneurin wrote of "the white houses of Glamorgan" when referring to Llantrisant. It was seized around 1246 by Richard de Clare, who built Llantrisant Castle. It is thought that de Clare established the borough of Llantrisant.

In 1346, Llantrisant was granted a royal charter months before the archers from the town helped Edward the Black Prince win a victory against the French army at the Battle of Crécy. The Llantrisant longbow men were pivotal in the adoption of the English longbow as the missile weapon of choice for the English crown during the Middle Ages.

Llantrisant was one of the eight boroughs constituting the Glamorgan borough following the Act of Union, a status it held until 1918.

== Culture ==
The ancient tradition of beating the bounds, where local children are bounced by elders on to the boundary stones of the old borough, still occurs every seven years and dates as far back as the 14th century. The rite was intended as a reminder to each generation of the importance of the borough boundaries. The children are held under the arms and the legs, and their backsides are bounced on each of the stones of the old borough. It is believed that the Beating of the Bounds started in 1346, when Llantrisant was awarded its royal charter. This allowed people the freedom to trade without paying tolls within the boundaries of the former borough. The last occasion of this event was in June 2024, and the event is now seen as a purely historic tradition and social community event.

At nearby Tarren Deusant is a spring with unusual petrosomatoglyph carvings of the faces of two saints (1696), but now six are present (Sharp 1979).

The Old Town of Llantrisant has four pubs: the New Inn, the Bear, the Wheatsheaf and the Cross Keys Hotel. Formerly in the Bull Ring was the Rock and Fountain pub, which became the home of the original Llantrisant Workingmen's Club, founded in May 1953 by Seth Morgan, Freeman of Llantrisant.

== Notable buildings ==
The focal point of the town is the Bull Ring, a commercial square in the centre of the town that was used for bull-baiting, until it was disallowed in 1827 due to unruly crowds. The square contains a statue of Dr William Price a pioneer of cremation.

=== Model House ===
The first workhouse in Glamorgan opened in Llantrisant in May 1784, using a number of adapted cottages on Swan Street and part of the Black Cock pub on Yr Allt, a road to the south west of the Bull Ring, between the parish church (to the west) and the castle (to the east).

The Union Workhouse was built in 1884 on the Bull Ring – west of where Dr Price's statue stands today and behind the town pump. It became known as The Model House, in the rather optimistic belief that its inmates would lead a life of model Christianity. Two pubs, a shop and a cottage were demolished to make way for the expansion of the workhouse.

The building closed as a workhouse in the early 1900s and first became a boarding house, then an inn and later a general store, called County Stores. They were known as a cornflour and provisions merchant, and a linen and woolen drapers, also selling boots and shoes. The site was bought in the 1950s by 'Planet Gloves', who manufactured gloves there until the late 1960s. The Model House stood empty for many years before being bought by the local authority to convert into a craft and design centre.

In 1989 the Model House re-opened as a craft and design centre. A registered charity, Model House was funded by the Arts Council of Wales since the demise of the Arts Council of Great Britain in 1994, receiving about 35,000 visitors a year. The ground floor contains galleries that include glass, ceramics and designer jewellery from established British and Welsh artists, as well as a local painter. The upper floors have workshops that are used by individual craftspeople, whose work can be purchased either from their studio or from the ground floor shop. The Model House has a programme of art and crafts exhibitions throughout the year and hosts a varied series of workshops, where adults and children may learn the basics of a wide range of contemporary craft skills.

The centre closed in December 2009 after the company which ran it, Model House Ltd, went into liquidation. The management of the building was taken over by Rhondda Cynon Taf County Borough Council, who after tackling structural problems with the roof and outer walls reopened the centre in mid 2010.

=== Llantrisant Castle ===
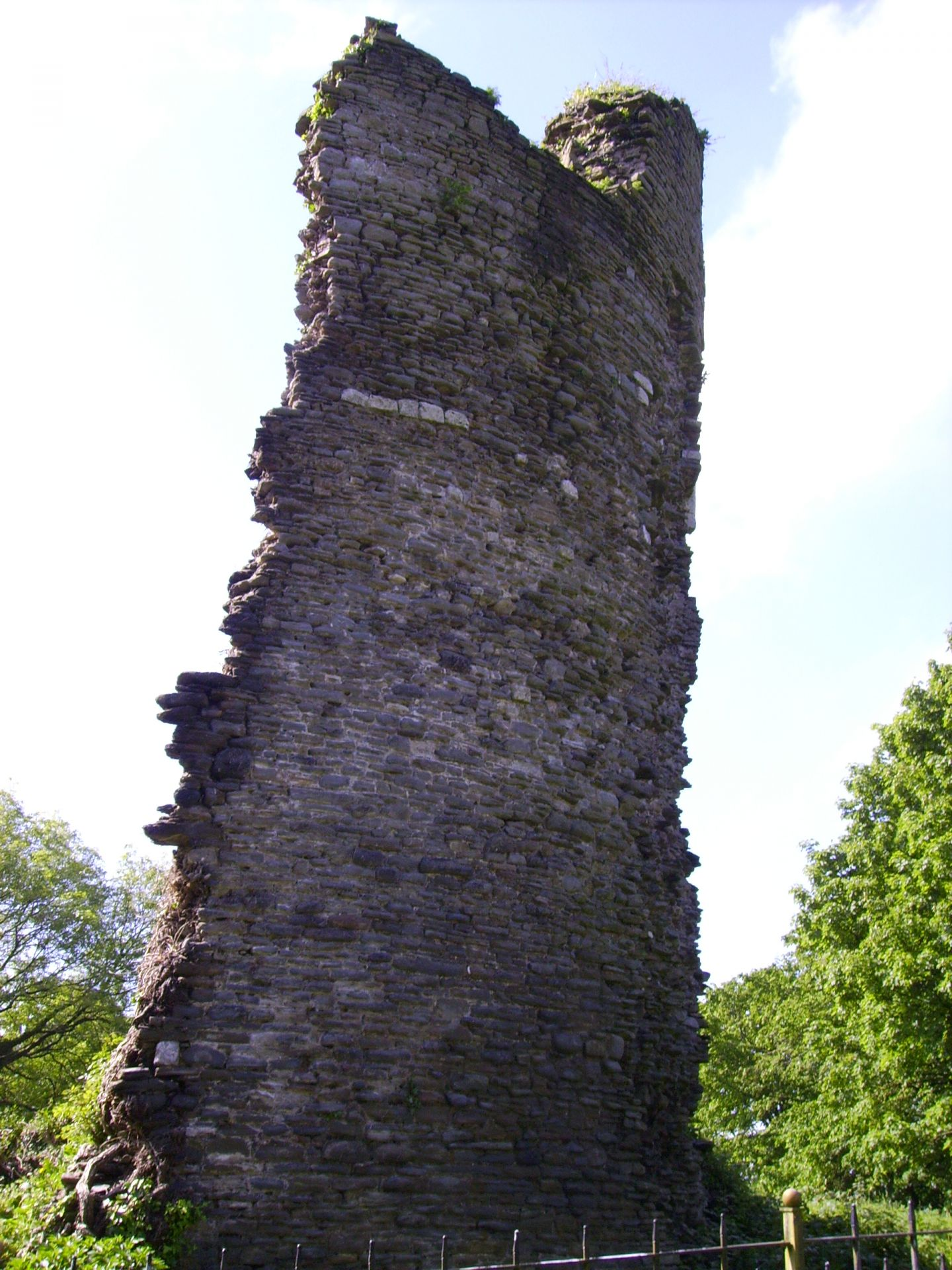
The remains of Llantrisant Castle

Llantrisant Castle stands in parkland in the centre of the town though only one wall of the raven tower remains. Although initially built as a wooden fortification it was rebuilt as a stone structure around 1246 by Richard de Clare, Lord of Glamorgan. In 1294 the castle was damaged during the uprising against the Norman overlords, led by Madog ap Llywelyn, and again in 1316 by Llywelyn Bren. It is believed that the castle was destroyed in 1404 by Owain Glyndŵr though there is no written proof of the event. John Leland reported the castle as ruined in his writings in 1536.

=== Llantrisant Guildhall ===
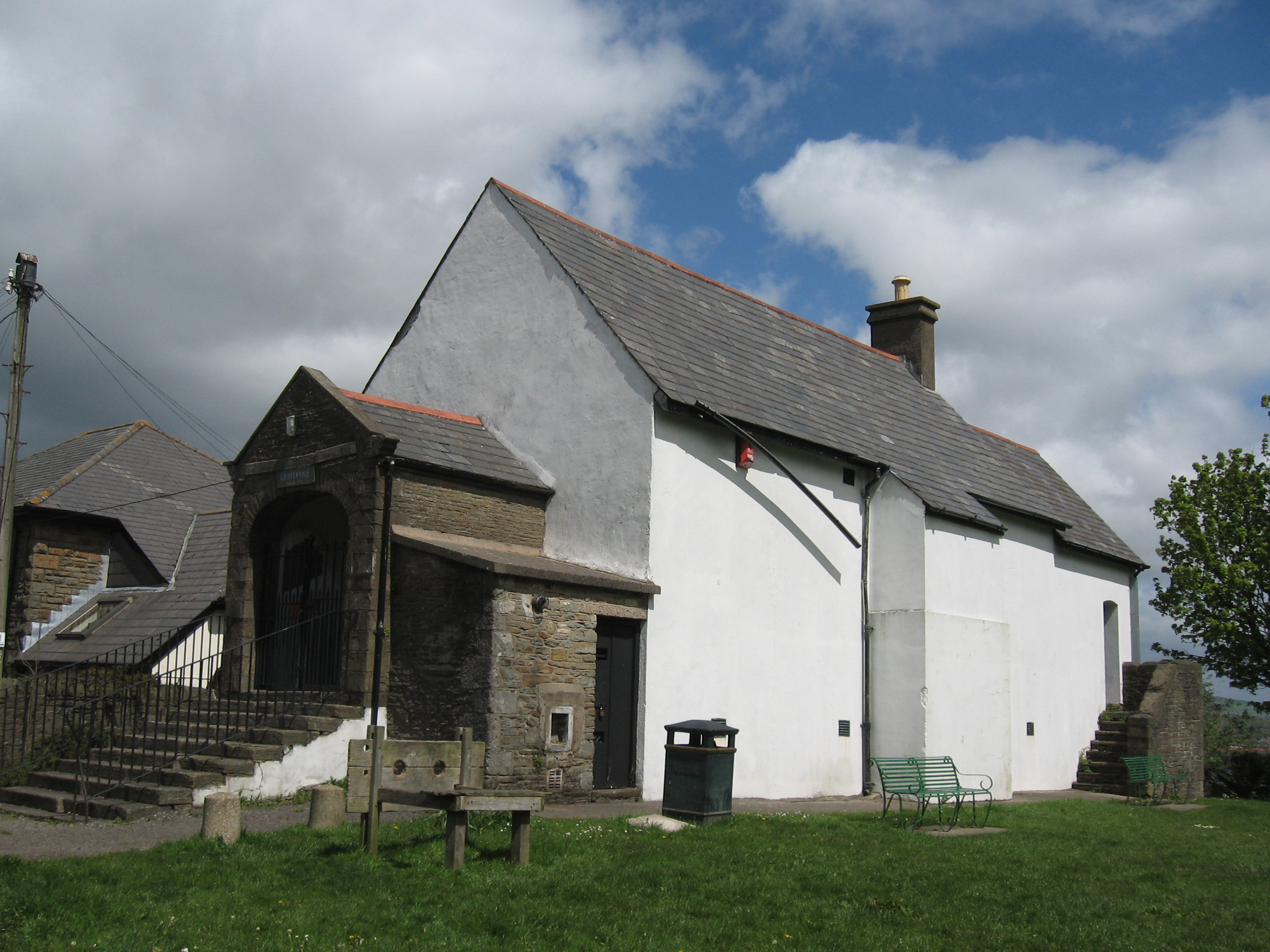
Llantrisant Guildhall

Llantrisant Guildhall, which was the meeting place of the borough council, was completed in 1773.

=== Llantrisant Parish Church and Penuel Chapel ===
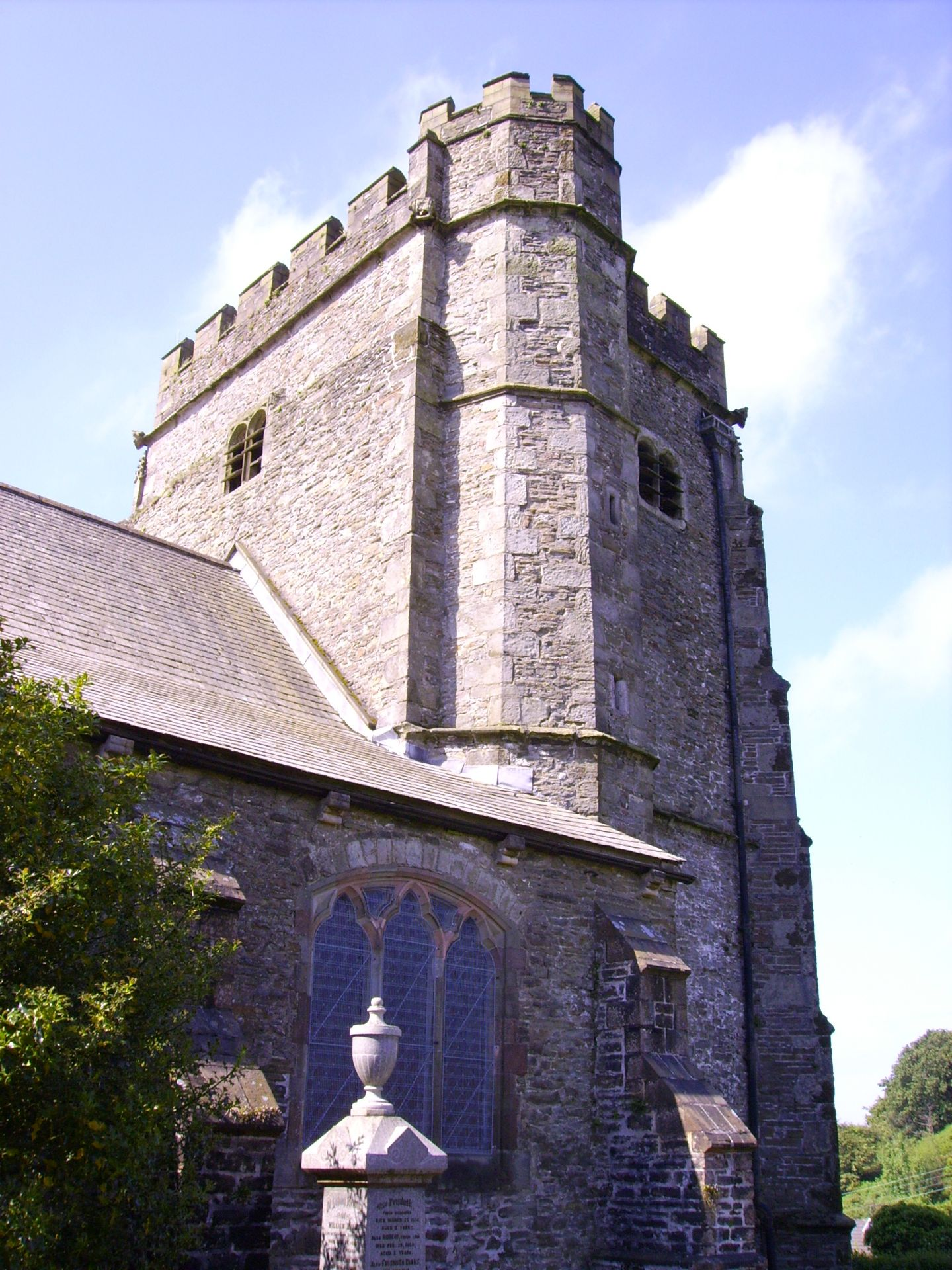
The 15th century tower of The Church of the Three Saints, Llantrisant

By the early 1900s Llantrisant had eight chapels, as well as the Llantrisant Parish Church Only two religious buildings remain. The elder is the church of 'y tri sant'. The three saints to which the church is dedicated are St. Illtyd, St. Gwynno and St. Dyfodwg. The site is believed to have been a place of Christian worship since at least the 7th century, and in 1096 the parish church was built and dedicated. The church was rebuilt by Richard de Clare in 1246 in the Norman style and in the 15th century the tower was added. Its interior houses an effigy of a 13th-century warrior, believed to be Cadwgan, lord of Miskin, a valuable Welsh church monument. The interior was restored in 1874 by Welsh neo-gothic designer John Prichard. The former parish office built 1873 on George Street is now a private home.

The second religious building in Llantrisant is Tabor Baptist Chapel, built in 1828. It is in on an elevated site next to Llantrisant Castle, accessed by steps from the High Street.

=== Y Billy Wynt ===
At the highest point of Y Graig is a stone tower known locally as “Billy Wynt”. Also said to have been used as an auxiliary tower with its high up positioning it remains a focal point of history. By the early 19th century the tower was in ruins and in 1890 it was restored as a folly by the Llantrisants' town trust.

The name "Billy Wynt" is an anglicisation of the Welsh Glamorganshire dialect word "Bili Wynt" meaning "windmill".

=== Y Pwysty ===
‘Y Pwysty’ the weighing house, was located on this site since medieval times. Once known as The Angel Inn, it was at Y Pwysty that the weight of goods were regulated at the markets and fairs held in the town.

=== The Royal Mint ===
The Royal Mint, which produces all British coins, moved from London to Llantrisant in 1967 in order to meet demand when the UK converted to decimal currency. In addition to British coins, the Royal Mint produces circulating coins for approximately 60 countries, as well as medals, bullion coins and bars. The Royal Mint also attracts tourists to Llantrisant to The Royal Mint Experience and the Royal Mint Museum which runs events and exhibitions around topics of interest.

== Environment ==
Llantrisant is typical of most locations in the South Wales region, being home to typical upland habitat birds and mammals of the British Isles. The town also contains Llantrisant Common and Pastures, a 113-hectare (280-acre) Site of Special Scientific Interest, which is home to several rare plants.

== Transport ==
Llantrisant is served by Pontyclun railway station three miles away, which was formerly known as Llantrisant railway station. Trains run by Transport for Wales call at the station.

== Employment and economy ==
The town is the home of the Royal Mint, which manufactures all British coins. The Royal Mint transferred to Llantrisant in 1967 and its attractions include the Mint's museum. The Mint employs around 900 people. A number of small, independent retailers have successfully found a home in Llantrisant Old Town. In addition to the Model House Craft & Design Centre, now well-established in a former 18th-century workhouse in the town centre, there is a village shop known as the Bullring Stores, a traditional toy shop with added vintage finds, galleries, pubs and restaurants.

The history of education in Llantrisant is firmly based in the varied religious institutions and Sunday School services which rapidly flourished between the 17th and 19th centuries. The Norman parish church was the starting point for the education movement, although it was one that would take a century or more to fully develop into a successful entity.

== Sport and leisure ==
Sport flourished in Llantrisant for centuries and the remains of a Welsh Handball court dating from the 1790s, stands at the rear of the Workingmen's Club. Llantrisant is also known as the home of Llantrisant Rugby Union Club known locally as the Black Army.

=== Llantrisant Male Choir ===
The town is home to one of the very longest established male choirs in Wales. Established at least as early as 1898, the choir is a prolific touring choir having sung in the USA, Italy, Cyprus, Slovakia, Poland, France, Germany, Ireland, the Netherlands and Spain. They travel extensively in the UK supporting charity events and singing at concert engagements. The choir has appeared at many notable venues, including The Royal Albert Hall, The Santa Maria Maggiore, Wales Millennium Centre and the Hollywood Bowl. The choir has a wide-ranging membership drawn from all ages and social backgrounds. They sing a mix of music from traditional choral classics, Welsh hymns and modern pop music.

== Notable people ==
See Category:People from Llantrisant

- Sir Leoline Jenkins, politician and judge
- William Price lived in the town.
- Andrew Bishop, Bradley Davies and Scott Andrews, Wales' international rugby union players.

=== Freemen of Llantrisant ===
- Sir David Evans: Lord Mayor of London in 1891
- Sir Cennydd George Traherne: Late Lord Lieutenant of Glamorgan 17 May 1935.
- Sir Brandon Meredith Rhys Williams: Late Conservative Politician

== Twin towns ==
Llantrisant has a twinning arrangement with Crécy-en-Ponthieu, France, since 2015.
