= Cnap Twt =

Protected area in Glamorgan, Wales

- Site of Special Scientific Interest
- Location within Wales
- Location of Cnap Twt.
- Area of search: Mid and South Glamorgan
- Grid reference: SS9102575373
- Coordinates: 51.4668°N 3.5702058°W
- Interest: Geological
- Area: 1.37 ha (3.4 acres)
- Notification date: 26 March 1997

Cnap Twt is a Site of Special Scientific Interest in the Vale of Glamorgan, south Wales. Located roughly three miles south of Bridgend near St Brides Major. This former disused quarry is of national importance as a site of fossil plant remains, and was established in 1997.

== See also ==
- List of Sites of Special Scientific Interest in Mid & South Glamorgan
