= Buckland Coach House & Ice House =

Protected area in Powys, Wales

Coordinates: 51.8854°N 3.2627°W

Buckland Coach House & Ice House is a Site of Special Scientific Interest in Brecknock, Powys, Wales. These are part of the grounds of Buckland House and have been leased into the care of the Vincent Wildlife Trust.

The Coach House is home to a breeding population of at least 400 adult lesser horseshoe bats. The Ice House provides a winter hibernation site, with 300 or more lesser horseshoe bats using it most years.

== See also ==
- List of Sites of Special Scientific Interest in Brecknock
