= Brynna a Wern Tarw =

Protected area in Glamorgan, Wales

- Site of Special Scientific Interest
- Location within Wales
- Location of Brynna a Wern Tarw.
- Area of search: Mid and South Glamorgan
- Grid reference: SS9781983097
- Coordinates: 51.537495°N 3.4746746°W
- Interest: Biological
- Area: 130.84 ha (323.3 acres)
- Notification date: 24 February 2003

Brynna a Wern Tarw is a Site of Special Scientific Interest located around Brynna in Rhondda Cynon Taf and Pencoed in Bridgend, south Wales.

The Countryside Council for Wales describe the area as: "Brynna a Wern Tarw is of special interest for its extensive area of mixed, species-rich lowland grassland, including significant areas of marshy and dry neutral grassland. Smaller areas of other habitats including broadleaved woodland and heath add to the interest. The site also provides habitat for the Marsh Fritillary butterfly."

== See also ==
- List of Sites of Special Scientific Interest in Mid & South Glamorgan
