= List of Sites of Special Scientific Interest in Newport =

Map of Newport within Wales

This is a list of the Sites of Special Scientific Interest (SSSIs) in the Newport Area of Search (AoS).

== History ==
This Area of Search was formed from parts of the previous AoS of Gwent.

== Sites ==
- Gwent Levels
  - Rumney
  - St Brides
  - Whitson
  - Nash and Goldcliff
  - Redwick
- Newport Wetlands
- Langstone-Llanmartin Meadows
- Parc Seymour Woods
- Penhow Woodlands
- Plas Machen Wood
- River Usk - Lower Usk
- Severn Estuary

== See also ==
- List of SSSIs by Area of Search
