= List of Sites of Special Scientific Interest in Torfaen =

Map of Torfaen within Wales

This is a list of the Sites of Special Scientific Interest (SSSIs) in the Torfaen Area of Search (AoS).

== Sites ==
- Blorenge
- Henllys Bog
- Llandegfedd Reservoir
- Tyr Hen Forwyn
