= List of Sites of Special Scientific Interest in Blaenau Gwent =

Map of Blaenau Gwent within Wales

This is a list of the Sites of Special Scientific Interest (SSSIs) in the Blaenau Gwent Area of Search (AoS).

== History ==
This Area of Search was mainly formed from parts of the previous AoS of Gwent as well as part of Brecknock.

== Sites ==
- Brynmawr Sections
- Cwm Clydach
- Cwm Merddog Woodlands
- Mynydd Llangatwg (Mynydd Llangattock)

== See also ==
- List of SSSIs by Area of Search
