= List of SSSIs in Mid & South Glamorgan =

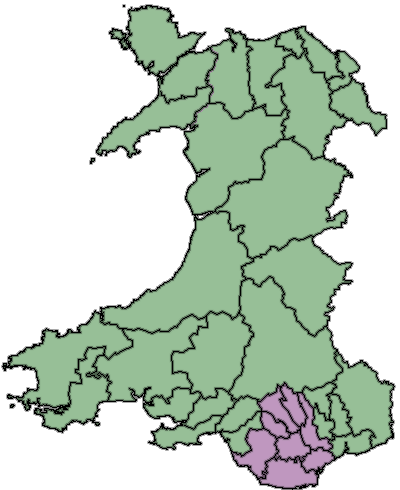
Mid & South Glamorgan AOS

Lists of Sites of Special Scientific Interest in Mid Glamorgan and South Glamorgan comprise:

- List of Sites of Special Scientific Interest in Bridgend County Borough
- List of Sites of Special Scientific Interest in Caerphilly County Borough
- List of Sites of Special Scientific Interest in Cardiff
- List of Sites of Special Scientific Interest in Merthyr Tydfil County Borough
- List of Sites of Special Scientific Interest in Rhondda Cynon Taf
- List of Sites of Special Scientific Interest in the Vale of Glamorgan
