= National nature reserves in Wales =

Protected area designation in Wales

In Wales, national nature reserves (NNRs) are selected and designated by Natural Resources Wales (NRW). There are 76 reserves, all of which are also SSSIs. They cover 26,536 hectares (265.36 km^{2}), or less than 1.5% of the land area of Wales. They range in size from Dan yr Ogof at 0.5 hectares (5,000 m^{2}) to Berwyn which covers 7,920 hectares (79.2 km^{2}) . A national nature reserve is designated because of its special biological, geological, habitat or landscape value and most in Wales are open to the public. They include upland and lowland areas, several offshore islands and in some cases estuarine and intertidal zones.

== Management ==
Although the majority of sites are managed by NRW, a number are managed by other bodies, mainly in the public and wildlife charity sectors, including:

- Bardsey Island Trust
- Caerphilly County Borough Council
- Forestry England
- Montgomeryshire Wildlife Trust
- National Botanic Garden of Wales
- The National Showcaves Centre for Wales
- National Trust
- Natural England
- North Wales Wildlife Trust
- RSPB
- University of Wales
- Wildlife Trust of South and West Wales
- Woodland Trust

== List of national nature reserves in Wales ==
Name	Image	Location	Established	Area	Manager
Aberbargoed Grasslands		Caerphilly; 51.686°N 3.211°W	14 June 2012	42.28 hectares (104.5 acres)	Caerphilly County Borough Council
Allt Rhyd y Groes		Carmarthenshire; 52.118°N 3.812°W	24 February 1983	69.71 hectares (172.3 acres)	NRW
Allt y Benglog		Gwynedd; 52.792°N 3.770°W	26 April 1994	11.51 hectares (28.4 acres)	NRW
Berwyn		Denbighshire, Gwynedd, Powys; 52.832°N 3.499°W	18 March 1999	7,919.76 hectares (19,570.2 acres)	NRW
Cadair Idris		Gwynedd; 52.694°N 3.896°W	6 January 1983	436.76 hectares (1,079.3 acres)	NRW
Carmel		Carmarthenshire; 51.827°N 4.041°W	24 July 1999	85.19 hectares (210.5 acres)	NRW
Ceunant Cynfal		Gwynedd; 52.951°N 3.927°W	26 April 1994	2.73 hectares (6.7 acres)	NRW
Ceunant Llennyrch		Gwynedd; 52.923°N 3.989°W	19 March 2018	329.24 hectares (813.6 acres)	NRW
Claerwen		Ceredigion, Powys; 52.305°N 3.717°W	21 July 1994	793.40 hectares (1,960.5 acres)	NRW
Coed Camlyn		Gwynedd; 52.938°N 3.993°W	3 June 1969	63.57 hectares (157.1 acres)	NRW
Coed Cymerau		Gwynedd; 52.966°N 3.955°W	29 August 1992	26.30 hectares (65.0 acres)	NRW
Coed Dolgarrog		Conwy; 53.183°N 3.846°W	20 April 1959	67.37 hectares (166.5 acres)	NRW
Coed Ganllwyd		Gwynedd; 52.800°N 3.895°W	2 April 1963	23.57 hectares (58.2 acres)	National Trust
Coed Gorswen		Conwy; 53.220°N 3.866°W	20 April 1959	13.57 hectares (33.5 acres)	NRW
Coed Rheidol		Ceredigion; 52.386°N 3.871°W	7 February 1994	165.91 hectares (410.0 acres)	NRW
Coed Tremadog		Gwynedd; 52.940°N 4.142°W	18 April 1958	2.64 hectares (6.5 acres)	NRW
Coed y Cerrig		Monmouthshire; 51.884°N 3.029°W	12 February 1988	10.38 hectares (25.6 acres)	NRW
Coed y Rhygen		Gwynedd; 52.914°N 3.965°W	3 June 1969	27.78 hectares (68.6 acres)	NRW
Coedmor		Ceredigion, Pembrokeshire; 52.063°N 4.633°W	5 July 1991	46.12 hectares (114.0 acres)	NRW
Coedydd Aber		Gwynedd; 53.218°N 4.002°W	4 March 1982	166.46 hectares (411.3 acres)	NRW
Coedydd Maentwrog		Gwynedd; 52.955°N 3.983°W	26 April 1966	68.32 hectares (168.8 acres)	NRW
Cors Bodeilio		Anglesey; 53.272°N 4.248°W	22 Mawrth 2013	41.53 hectares (102.6 acres)	NRW
Cors Caron		Ceredigion; 52.255°N 3.922°W	22 January 1981	839.75 hectares (2,075.1 acres)	NRW
Cors Erddreiniog		Anglesey; 53.312°N 4.297°W	22 March 2013	250.26 hectares (618.4 acres)	NRW
Cors Geirch		Gwynedd; 52.904°N 4.515°W	22 March 2013	122.49 hectares (302.7 acres)	NRW
Cors Goch		Anglesey; 53.306°N 4.256°W	15 June 1995	52.72 hectares (130.3 acres)	North Wales Wildlife Trust
Cors Goch Llanllwch		Carmarthenshire; 51.842°N 4.374°W	23 July 1996	18.42 hectares (45.5 acres)	Wildlife Trust South and West Wales
Cors Gyfelog		Gwynedd; 53.007°N 4.297°W	22 March 2013	36.97 hectares (91.4 acres)	NRW
Cors y Llyn		Powys; 52.187°N 3.441°W	27 February 1987	25.12 hectares (62.1 acres)	NRW
Corsydd Llangloffan		Pembrokeshire; 51.945°N 5.050°W	5 July 1991	38.93 hectares (96.2 acres)	NRW
Craig Cerrig Gleisiad a Fan Frynych		Powys; 51.891°N 3.518°W	1 November 2002	488.38 hectares (1,206.8 acres)	NRW
Craig y Cilau		Powys; 51.836°N 3.178°W	23 September 1959	64.82 hectares (160.2 acres)	NRW
Crymlyn Bog & Pant y Sais		Neath Port Talbot, Swansea; 51.633°N 3.883°W	27 September 1991	130.83 hectares (323.3 acres)	NRW
Cwm Cadlan		Rhondda Cynon Taf; 51.774°N 3.509°W	3 March 2006	32.93 hectares (81.4 acres)	NRW
Cwm Clydach		Blaenau Gwent, Monmouthshire; 51.805°N 3.135°W	3 February 2012	30.65 hectares (75.7 acres)	NRW
Cwm Glas Crafnant		Conwy; 53.120°N 3.892°W	19 July 1960	15.02 hectares (37.1 acres)	NRW
Cwm Idwal		Conwy, Gwynedd; 53.111°N 4.030°W	24 November 1954	403.30 hectares (996.6 acres)	NRW
Dan yr Ogof		Powys; 51.830°N 3.688°W	2 April 2004	0.52 hectares (1.3 acres)	The National Showcaves Centre
Dinefwr Park		Carmarthenshire; 51.879°N 4.016°W	13 July 2007	224.53 hectares (554.8 acres)	National Trust
Dyfi		Ceredigion, Gwynedd; 52.529°N 4.015°W	24 November 1992	2,290.36 hectares (5,659.6 acres)	NRW
Fenn's, Whixall & Bettisfield Mosses		Wrexham, Shropshire; 52.927°N 2.762°W	1 May 2021	583.94 hectares (1,442.9 acres)	Natural England
Fiddlers Elbow		Monmouthshire; 51.821°N 2.686°W	15 November 2017	28.34 hectares (70.0 acres)	Woodland Trust
Gower Coast		Swansea; 51.559°N 4.281°W	6 February 2002	92.17 hectares (227.8 acres)	National Trust
Grassholm Island		Pembrokeshire; 51.731°N 5.479°W	23 July 1996	10.77 hectares (26.6 acres)	RSPB
Gregynog		Powys; 52.566°N 3.352°W	6 March 2013	214.17 hectares (529.2 acres)	University of Wales
Hafod Elwy Moor		Denbighshire; 53.094°N 3.572°W	5 October 1999	82.96 hectares (205.0 acres)	NRW
Hafod Garregog		Gwynedd; 52.978°N 4.084°W	15 April 1987	86.70 hectares (214.2 acres)	National Trust
Kenfig Pool and Dunes		Bridgend, Neath Port Talbot; 51.523°N 3.742°W	23 May 1989	513.72 hectares (1,269.4 acres)	NRW
Lady Park Wood (EN)		Gloucestershire, Monmouthshire; 51.827°N 2.658°W	21 November 1985	37.86 hectares (93.6 acres)	Forestry England
Llyn Eiddwen		Ceredigion; 52.282°N 4.044°W	23 July 1996	11.53 hectares (28.5 acres)	Wildlife Trust South and West Wales
Maes-y-Facrell, Pen y Gogarth		Conwy; 53.328°N 3.846°W	26 February 2009	5.22 hectares (12.9 acres)	NRW
Merthyr Mawr Warren		Bridgend; 51.480°N 3.640°W	3 July 2002	324.23 hectares (801.2 acres)	NRW
Morfa Dyffryn		Gwynedd; 52.799°N 4.135°W	18 January 1962	197.37 hectares (487.7 acres)	NRW
Morfa Harlech		Gwynedd; 52.898°N 4.122°W	9 October 1981	880.73 hectares (2,176.3 acres)	NRW
Nant Irfon		Powys; 52.173°N 3.697°W	8 December 1983	137.57 hectares (339.9 acres)	NRW
Newborough Warren & Ynys Llanddwyn		Anglesey; 53.152°N 4.373°W	2 December 1992	1,556.43 hectares (3,846.0 acres)	NRW
Newport Wetlands		Newport; 51.537°N 2.941°W	16 April 2008	865.72 hectares (2,139.2 acres)	NRW
Ogof Ffynnon Ddu		Powys; 51.826°N 3.643°W	1 Mawrh 1993	417.97 hectares (1,032.8 acres)	NRW
Oxwich		Swansea; 51.566°N 4.154°W	15 November 2017	228.49 hectares (564.6 acres)	NRW
Pengelli Forest		Pembrokeshire; 52.019°N 4.726°W	27 July 1995	65.94 hectares (162.9 acres)	Wildlife Trust South and West Wales
Penhow Woodlands		Monmouthshire, Newport; 51.607°N 2.839°W	15 November 1984	24.04 hectares (59.4 acres)	NRW
Ramsey		Pembrokeshire; 51.865°N 5.340°W	23 July 1996	281.56 hectares (695.7 acres)	RSPB
Rhinog		Gwynedd; 52.840°N 3.985°W	1 December 1970	592.39 hectares (1,463.8 acres)	NRW
Rhos Goch		Powys; 52.127°N 3.175°W	27 February 1987	45.21 hectares (111.7 acres)	NRW
Rhos Llawr Cwrt		Ceredigion; 52.122°N 4.319°W	24 November 1992	58.73 hectares (145.1 acres)	NRW
Roundton Hill		Powys; 52.547°N 3.042°W	31 May 2000	33.45 hectares (82.7 acres)	Montgomeryshire Wildlife Trust
Skokholm		Pembrokeshire; 51.697°N 5.277°W	6 December 2008	98.49 hectares (243.4 acres)	Wildlife Trust South and West Wales
Skomer		Pembrokeshire; 51.736°N 5.293°W	2 April 1963	306.56 hectares (757.5 acres)	Wildlife Trust South and West Wales
Stackpole		Pembrokeshire; 51.615°N 4.916°W	8 March 1995	232.79 hectares (575.2 acres)	NRW and National Trust
Stanner Rocks		Powys; 52.219°N 3.079°W	18 February 1981	5.42 hectares (13.4 acres)	NRW
Tŷ Canol		Pembrokeshire; 51.997°N 4.779°W	22 September 1986	70.11 hectares (173.2 acres)	NRW
Waun Las		Carmarthenshire; 51.842°N 4.137°W	7 August 2008	150.14 hectares (371.0 acres)	National Botanic Garden of Wales
Whiteford		Swansea; 51.634°N 4.243°W	26 April 1966	806.05 hectares (1,991.8 acres)	NRW and National Trust
Ynys Enlli		Gwynedd; 52.759°N 4.790°W	24 March 1986	178.64 hectares (441.4 acres)	Bardsey Island Trust
Yr Eifl		Gwynedd; 52.969°N 4.431°W	22 March 2013	39.25 hectares (97.0 acres)	NRW
Yr Wyddfa		Gwynedd; 53.058°N 4.049°W	26 April 1966	1,671.76 hectares (4,131.0 acres)	NRW

== See also ==
- National nature reserves in England
- Nature reserves in Northern Ireland
- National nature reserve (Scotland)
