= List of Sites of Special Scientific Interest in Gwynedd =

Map of Gwynedd within Wales

This is a list of the Sites of Special Scientific Interest (SSSIs) in Gwynedd, covering the East Gwynedd and West Gwynedd Area of Search (AoS).

== Sites ==
- Mawddach Estuary
- Aberdunant
- Abergeirch
- Afon Ddu
- Afon Dyfi ger Mallwyd
- Afon Dyfrdwy (River Dee) SSSI
- Afon Eden - Cors Goch Trawsfynydd
- Afon Gwyrfai a Llyn Cwellyn
- Afon Seiont
- Amnodd-Bwll Stream Section
- Arthog Hall Woods
- Barmouth Hillside
- Benallt Mine and Nant y Gadwen
- Berwyn
- Broadwater
- Bryn Coch a Chapel Hermon
- Bryn Glas Quarry
- Bryn y Gwin Isaf
- Bryn-llin-fawr
- Cadair Idris
- Caeau Bwlch
- Caeau Tan y Bwlch
- Caeau Tyddyn Dicwm
- Caerau Uchaf
- Cappas Lwyd
- Carreg y Llam
- Castell Prysor
- Cefndeuddwr
- Ceunant Aberderfel
- Ceunant Cynfal
- Chwarel Cwm Hirnant
- Chwarel Gwenithfaen Madoc
- Chwareli Gelli-grin
- Clogwynygarreg
- Coed Aber Artro
- Coed Afon Pumryd
- Coed Cors y Gedol
- Coed Cwmgwared
- Coed Dinorwig
- Coed Elernion
- Coed Graig Uchaf
- Coed Llechwedd
- Coed Lletywalter
- Coed Tremadog
- Coed y Gofer
- Coed y Rhygen
- Coedydd Aber
- Coedydd Abergwynant
- Coedydd Afon Menai
- Coedydd Beddgelert a Cheunant Aberglaslyn
- Coedydd De Dyffryn Maentwrog
- Coedydd Dyffryn Ffestiniog (Gogleddol)
- Coedydd Dyffryn Wnion
- Coedydd Nanmor
- Coedydd Nantgwynant
- Cors Barfog
- Cors Geirch
- Cors Graianog
- Cors Gyfelog
- Cors Hirdre
- Cors Llanllyfni
- Cors Llyferin
- Cors y Sarnau
- Cors y Wlad
- Craig y Benglog
- Craig yr Aderyn (Birds rock)
- Craig-y-don
- Craig-y-Garn
- Cregennen a Pared y Cefn Hir
- Cutiau
- Cwm Cynfal
- Cwm Dwythwch
- Dinas Dinlle
- Dol-cyn-afon
- Dolorgan Barn
- Dyfi
- Eithinog
- Eryri
- Ffriddoedd Garndolbenmaen
- Foel Gron a Thir Comin Mynytho
- Foel Gron Stream Sections
- Foel Ispri
- Gallt y Bwlch
- Ganllwyd
- Glanllynnau a Glannau Pen-ychain i Gricieth
- Glannau Aberdaron
- Glannau Tonfanau i Friog
- Glaslyn
- Glyn Cywarch
- Glynllifon
- Gwydir Bay
- Gwynfynydd
- Hermon Copper Bog
- Llafar River Sections Trychiad Afon Llafar
- Llwyn iarth
- Llwyn y Coed
- Llyn Glasfryn
- Llyn Gwernan
- Llyn Padarn
- Llyn Peris
- Llyn Tegid
- Llystyn Isaf
- Maes Meillion a Gefail y cwm
- Migneint - Arenig - Dduallt
- Moel Hebog
- Moel Tryfan
- Moelwyn Mawr
- Moelypenmaen
- Morfa Abererch
- Morfa Dinlle
- Morfa Dyffryn
- Morfa Harlech
- Mountain Cottage Quarry
- Muriau Gwyddelod
- Mwyngloddiau Llanfrothen
- Mwyngloddiau Wnion a Eglwys Sant Marc
- Mynydd Penarfynydd
- Mynydd Tir y Cwmwd ar Glannau at Garreg Imbill
- Nant y Graean a Nant Ganol
- Ogof Ddu
- Pant Cae Haidd
- Pant y Panel
- Pen Benar
- Penmaen
- Penmaenuchaf Hall
- Porth Ceiriad Porth Neigwl ac Ynysoedd Sant Tudwal
- Porth Dinllaen i Borth Pistyll
- Porth Towyn i Borth Wen
- Rhinog
- Rhiw-for-fawr
- Rhosgyll Fawr
- Rhyllech Uchaf
- Talhenbont
- Tan y Grisiau
- Tiroedd a Glannau Rhwng Cricieth ac Afon Glaslyn
- Traeth Lafan
- Trum y Ddysgl
- Trychiad Ffordd Coed Llyn y Garnedd
- Trychiad Ffordd Craig Fach
- Trychiad ffordd Moel Hafod Owen
- Tryweryn River Sections
- Ty Bach Ystlumod
- Tyllau Mwn
- Tyn-Llan
- Wern Road Section
- Wig Bach ar Glannau i Borth Alwm
- Y Foryd
- Ynys Enlli
- Ynysoedd y Gwylanod - Gwylan Islands
- Yr Arddu
- Yr Eifl
