= Pont Bodefail =

Bridge in Gwynedd, Wales

- Coordinates: 52°54′05″N 4°27′55″W
- Carries: A497 road
- Crosses: Afon Rhyd-hir

History
- Construction start: April 2022
- Opened: April 2023

Location
- Interactive map of Pont Bodefail

Pont Bodefail is a bridge between the villages of Boduan and Efailnewydd in Wales.

The bridge carries the A497 road over the Afon Rhyd-hir. It is a single-span concrete arch bridge clad with locally sourced masonry. It runs parallel to Pont Bodfel which was damaged in a storm in 2019 and subsequently repaired and reopened as a pedestrian and cyclist crossing.

== Construction ==
Planning permission for the bridge was granted in 2021. Construction began in April 2022. It was opened in April 2023.
