= Pont Bodfel =

Bridge in Gwynedd, Wales

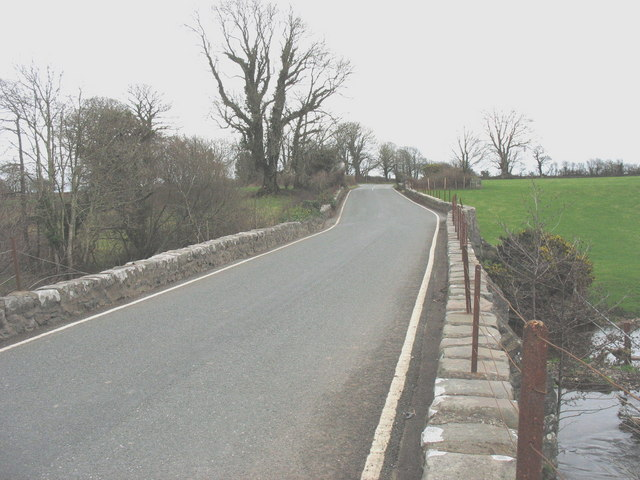
- Coordinates: 52°54′4.4″N 4°27′54.83″W
- Carries: Pedestrians and cyclists, formerly the A497 road
- Crosses: Afon Rhyd-hir

History
- Construction start: April 2022
- Opened: April 2023

Location
- Interactive map of Pont Bodfel

Pont Bodfel is a bridge between the villages of Boduan and Efailnewydd in Wales.

The bridge formerly carried the A497 road over the Afon Rhyd-hir. It has a three-span structure and is Grade II listed.

On 27 January 2019, the bridge partially collapsed. A temporary single-lane bridge was subsequently installed parallel to Pont Bodfel. A new bridge, Pont Bodefail, was constructed parallel to Pont Bodfel to carry road traffic and Pont Bodfel was reopened for use by pedestrians and cyclists.
