= Cors Goch National Nature Reserve =

Cors Goch National Nature Reserve may refer to:

- Cors Goch National Nature Reserve (Anglesey)
- Cors Goch National Nature Reserve (Llanllwch)
