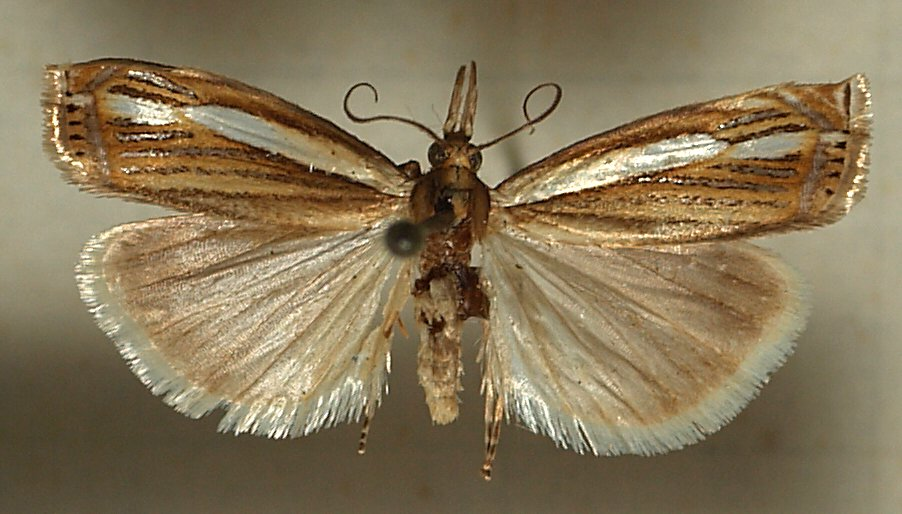

Scientific classification
- Kingdom: Animalia
- Phylum: Arthropoda
- Clade: Pancrustacea
- Class: Insecta
- Order: Lepidoptera
- Family: Crambidae
- Genus: Crambus
- Species: C. silvella

Binomial name
- Crambus silvella (Hübner, 1813)

Synonyms
- Tinea silvella Hübner, 1813; Crambus adippellus Zincken, 1817; Argyroteuchia adippalis Hübner, 1825

= Crambus silvella =

Species of moth

Crambus silvella, informally the bog grass moth, is a species of moth of the family Crambidae. It is found in Europe.

The wingspan is 22–26 millimetres (0.87–1.02 in). It is very similar to Crambus pascuella, the key differences being as follows : forewings with apex little produced, dorsum less whitish, median streak less broad, continued beyond second line to termen, costal spot before second line much more elongate. See also Parsons et al.

It has one brood a year, most visible in July and August. It is active at dusk and into the night. It is found in boggy moorland and heathland, where it feeds on sedges (Carex); it lays eggs, and its larvae pupate, in the soil.

It is a rare species in the UK and in 2026 was found in Wales for the first time, in the Cors Geirch National Nature Reserve on the Llŷn Peninsula.

== Bibliography ==
- Ivinskis, Povilas; Ostrauskas, Henrikas (2010). "New Lithuanian records of moths captured in beetle traps". Ekologija. 56 (3): 105–109. doi:10.2478/v10055-010-0015-7. ISSN 0235-7224.
