= St Dogmaels television relay station =

St Dogmaels
- Mast height: 25 metres (82 ft)
- Coordinates: 52°04′30″N 4°40′42″W
- Built: 1978
- Relay of: Preseli
- BBC region: BBC Wales
- ITV region: ITV Cymru Wales

The St Dogmaels television relay station is a broadcasting and telecommunications facility located just above the village of St Dogmaels in Pembrokeshire, Wales, about 2 km to the south west of the town of Cardigan, in neighbouring Ceredigion(grid reference SN165452). It was originally built by the IBA as a 625-line analogue UHF television relay, entering service in early 1978. Since then it has been converted to transmit the main three multiplexes of the DVB-T digital television system.

The builders of this UHF relay chose not to re-use a nearby existing site with a 45 metres (148 ft) lattice tower built by the BBC in 1967 as a relay for the 405-line VHF TV system. This despite it being only about 1.5 km to the south west and on higher ground.

The site has a self-standing tower erected on land that is itself about 100 meters above sea level. The television broadcasts primarily cover St Dogmaels itself plus the town of Cardigan and the upper estuary of the Teifi river.

The transmissions from this relay come off-air from the Preseli transmitter about 20 km to the south.

== Services listed by frequency ==
=== Analogue television ===
==== Early 1978 - 1 November 1982 ====
At the time this relay was built, the UK only had three UHF networks.

Frequency	UHF	kW	Service
487.25 MHz	23	0.015	HTV Wales
511.25 MHz	26	0.015	BBC2 Wales
567.25 MHz	33	0.015	BBC1 Wales

==== 1 November 1982 - 19 August 2009 ====
The new Channel 4 network arrived in 1982. Being in Wales, St Dogmaels carried the Welsh variant S4C.

Frequency	UHF	kW	Service
487.25 MHz	23	0.015	ITV1 Wales (HTV Wales until 2002)
511.25 MHz	26	0.015	BBC Two Wales
535.25 MHz	29	0.015	S4C
567.25 MHz	33	0.015	BBC One Wales

=== Analogue and digital television ===
==== 19 August 2009 - 16 September 2009 ====
The digital switchover started on this relay's parent transmitter at Preseli. BBC Two Wales was shut down. ITV1 Wales moved to the old BBC Two Wales frequency, freeing up channel 23 which then became this site's first digital transmission.

Frequency	UHF	kW	Service	System
490.000 MHz	23	0.003	BBC A	DVB-T
511.25 MHz	26	0.015	ITV1 Wales	PAL System I
535.25 MHz	29	0.015	S4C	PAL System I
567.25 MHz	33	0.015	BBC One Wales	PAL System I

=== Digital television ===
==== 16 September 2009 - present ====
With the completion of the digital switchover at Preseli on 16 September, all analogue television from this site ceased forever. The site now only delivers DVB-T digital television.

Frequency	UHF	kW	Operator
546.000 MHz	30 (was 23)	0.003	BBC A
554.000 MHz	31 (was 26)	0.003	Digital 3&4
602.000 MHz	37 (was 29)	0.003	BBC B

== See also ==
- List of masts
- List of radio stations in the United Kingdom
- List of tallest buildings and structures in Great Britain
