= Cardigan transmitting station =

Cardigan
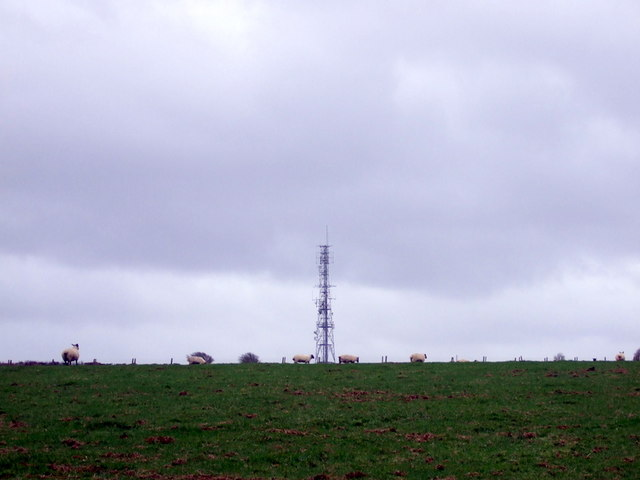

- Location within Pembrokeshire
- Tower height: 45 metres (148 ft)
- Coordinates: 52.0642°N 4.69454°W
- Grid reference: SN154442
- Built: 1967
- BBC region: BBC Wales (1967-1982)

The Cardigan transmitting station is a broadcasting and telecommunications facility located at Penwaun in Pembrokeshire, Wales, about 3 km to the south west of the town of Cardigan, in neighbouring Ceredigion. It was originally built by the BBC, entering service in 1967 acting as a relay transmitter for the now-defunct 405-line VHF television system.

== Specifications ==
The site has a self-standing 45 m (148 ft) lattice tower erected on land that is itself about 180 m above sea level. The television broadcast primarily covered the town of Cardigan and the estuary of the Teifi river.

The 405-line VHF television service closed across the UK in 1985, but according to the BBC's transmitter list and the BBC's internal "Eng. Inf." magazine, Cardigan was due to close early - in the third quarter of 1982. From that point until 1992, the site was used for telecommunications purposes only. The local UHF television relay (analogue and digital) was sited at St. Dogmaels, about 1.5 km north east of the Penwaun site.

Penwaun currently broadcasts a single analogue FM radio station, Radio Ceredigion, serving a very similar area to the one intended for the old 405-line television coverage. This transmission is a relay of the Radio Ceredigion service from Blaenplwyf transmitting station about 50 km to the north east.

== Services listed by frequency ==
=== Analogue television ===
==== 6 February 1967 - Third Quarter 1982 ====
Frequency	VHF	kW	Service
51.75 MHz	2	0.044	BBC1 Wales

=== Analogue radio (FM VHF) ===
==== 14 December 1992 - January 2012 ====
Frequency	kW	Service
97.4 MHz	0.2	Radio Ceredigion

== See also ==
- List of masts
- List of radio stations in the United Kingdom
- List of tallest buildings and structures in Great Britain
