= Coedmor National Nature Reserve =

Nature reserve in Wales

Coordinates: 52.0613°N 4.6328°W

Coedmor National Nature Reserve is a nature reserve in Wales, located just south of Cardigan, between Llechryd Bridge and the Teifi Marshes in Ceredigion. The reserve comprises a narrow band of woodland about 4 km long, situated on steep slopes on the north bank of the River Teifi, at an altitude of 5–50 m. It was established in order to protect the natural oak woodland on the slopes on either sides of the Teifi gorge. The site is particularly valued for its rich lichen flora, including several rare species, and represents one of the best examples of ancient woodland habitat in the region despite historical disturbances.

== Geography and landscape ==
The reserve features steep, south-west-facing slopes, which have helped to preserve its ecological significance despite historical disturbances. These geographical features have made complete removal of tree cover difficult throughout history, contributing to the survival of rare species and habitats. Slightly calcareous shale outcrops occur across the site, providing secondary habitats for specialised flora and fauna. Coedmor is one of less than twenty national nature reserves in Wales without water bodies.

== Flora ==
The woodland is predominantly composed of sessile oak (Quercus petraea), with localised areas of ash (Fraxinus excelsior), beech (Fagus sylvatica) and elm (Ulmus spp.). Owing to disease, few young elms remain within the reserve. An area of mature standard oaks has been preserved near a large house for its landscape value, providing habitat continuity.

== Ecological significance ==
Coedmor has been assigned a Revised Index of Ecological Continuity (RIEC) of 90 and a New Index of Ecological Continuity (NIEC) of 34 plus four bonus species, indicating an ancient origin and continuous ecological continuity of the woodland. Although ancient trees are now scarce and the woodland has endured substantial disturbance, these high index values reflect its long-established ecosystem.

The reserve is notable for its rare lichen funga. It is the type locality for Biatora britannica, first described from a specimen collected on a young dead elm trunk in the reserve in 1996. Other rare lichens recorded at Coedmor include Nephroma laevigatum, Porina heterospora (one of only two records on the British mainland), Sticta canariensis and Lobaria pulmonaria, the latter confined to the area of mature oaks preserved for landscape value.

== Conservation ==
Despite past disturbances and the rarity of ancient trees, old-forest species have persisted at Coedmor. The steep terrain has impeded complete tree clearance, while slightly calcareous shale outcrops have provided essential secondary habitats. Several areas appear to have been deliberately preserved for their landscape value, allowing mature oaks to remain. In addition, certain crustose lichens have survived felling events by persisting on the bases of old coppice stools. The richest assemblage of old-forest lichens occurs on a steep, south-west-facing slope that is well lit by fallen trees, fostering optimal conditions for these shade-tolerant species.
