= Coed Camlyn National Nature Reserve =

Nature reserve in Gwynedd, Wales

Coordinates: 52.939°N 3.997°W

Coed Camlyn National Nature Reserve is a nature reserve located south of the village of Maentwrog in Gwynedd, Wales.

Rising steeply from the River Dwyryd valley floor, the reserve forms part of the extensive and dramatic wooded landscape of the Vale of Ffestiniog. Numerous species of woodland birds breed here, and the cliffs at the top end of the wood provide good nesting places for ravens.
