= Maes y Facrell National Nature Reserve =

Nature reserve in Conwy, Wales

Coordinates: 53.3287°N 3.8474°W

Maes y Facrell National Nature Reserve sits high above the coastal town of Llandudno on the Great Orme headland, in the county of Conwy, Wales. It commands sweeping views of Conwy Bay, and the mountains of Snowdonia.

Designated a national nature reserve both for its biological and geological interest, it contains a mosaic of flower-rich grassland, and fragments of limestone pavement. There is evidence of past human activity and old copper mines scattered throughout the site.

== See also ==
- National nature reserves in Wales
