= Moel Lefn =

Mountain in Gwynedd, Wales

Coordinates: 53.0001°N 4.1398°W

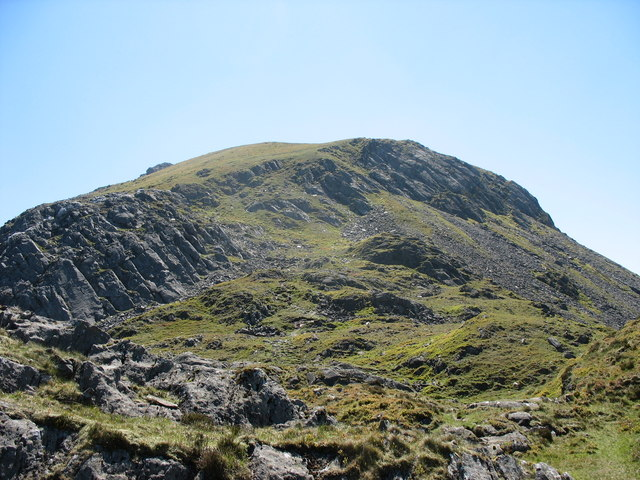
- The northern face of Moel Lefn

Highest point
- Elevation: 638 m (2,093 ft)
- Prominence: 62 m (203 ft)
- Parent peak: Moel Hebog
- Listing: Hewitt, Nuttall

Naming
- Language of name: Welsh

Geography
- Location: Gwynedd, Wales
- Parent range: Moel Hebog
- OS grid: SH565469
- Topo map: OS Landranger 115

Moel Lefn is a summit in Snowdonia, Wales. It is a subsidiary peak of Moel Hebog and a sister peak of Moel yr Ogof. Its summit marks the end of the Hebog ridge.

The North Eastern flank of Moel Lefn shows a good example of Columnar jointing within the rhyolite unit that comprises the majority of the mountain.

The Beddgelert Forest lies directly to the east, while Cwm Pennant lies to the west. Good views of the Nantlle ridge are observed. There are two tall upright stone cairns on the eastern side of the mountain.
