= Moel Hebog =

Mountain in Snowdonia, Wales

Coordinates: 53.00014°N 4.13980°W

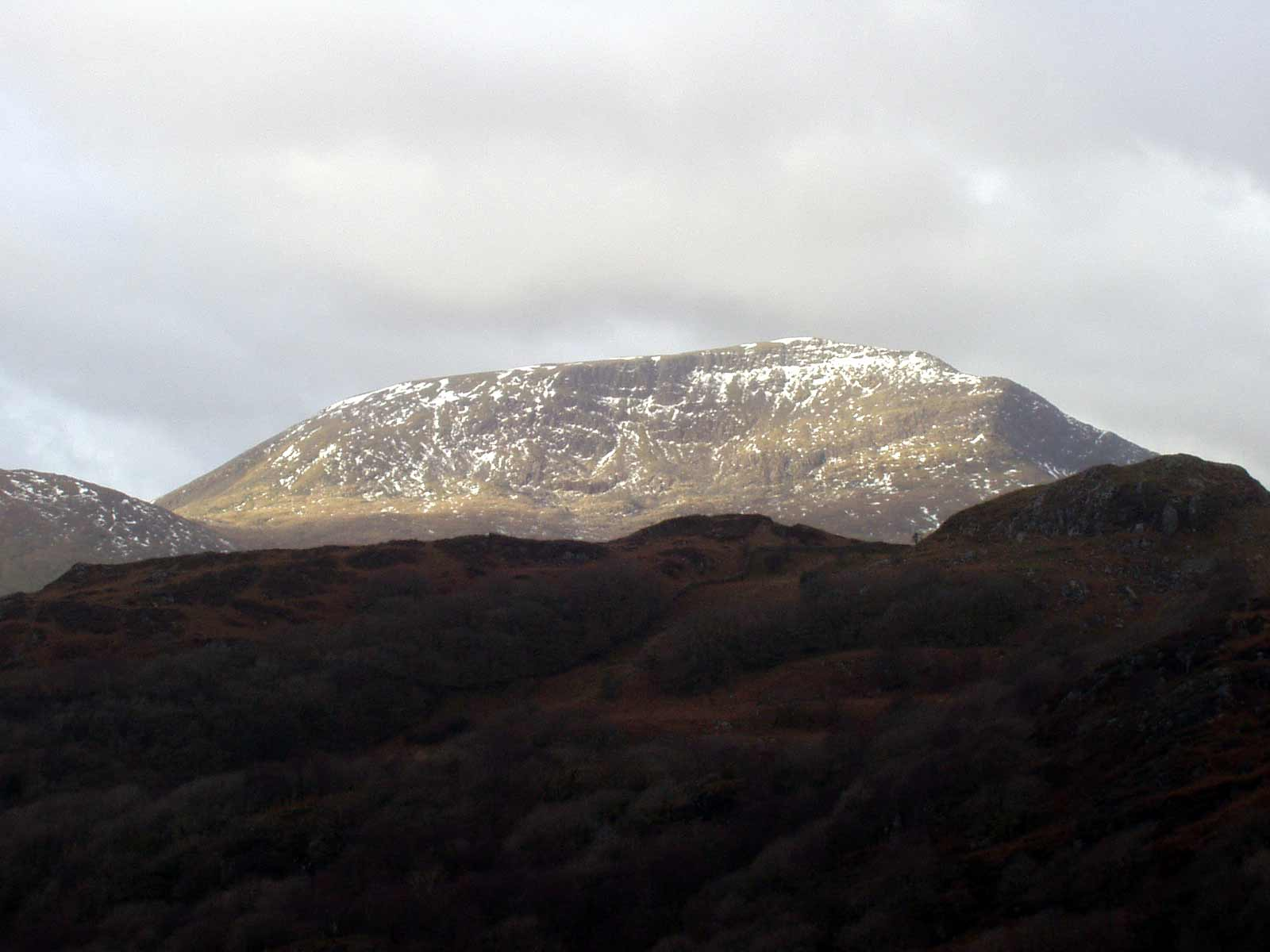
- Moel Hebog, seen from the south

Highest point
- Elevation: 783.7 m (2,571 ft)
- Prominence: 585 m (1,919 ft)
- Parent peak: Snowdon
- Listing: Marilyn, Hewitt, Nuttall

Naming
- English translation: Hill of the hawk/falcon
- Language of name: Welsh
- Pronunciation: Welsh: [ˈmɔil ˈhɛbɔɡ]

Geography
- Location: Snowdonia, Wales
- OS grid: SH565469
- Topo map: OS Landranger 115

Listed summits of Moel Hebog
Name	Grid ref	Height	Status
Moel yr Ogof		655 metres (2,149 ft)	Hewitt, Nuttall
Moel Lefn		638 metres (2,093 ft)	Hewitt, Nuttall
Moel Ddu		553 metres (1,814 ft)	Hewitt, Nuttall, Marilyn

Moel Hebog (Welsh for 'bare hill of the hawk') is a mountain in Snowdonia, north Wales, rising to 783 metres (2,569 feet) above sea level and dominating the western view from the village of Beddgelert. The name means "hill of the hawk" in Welsh. It is the principal summit of a range that extends through the north-western corner of Snowdonia, which includes the Nantlle Ridge and Mynydd Mawr. Geologically significant, the mountain comprises a complex succession of Cambrian and Ordovician rocks, including volcanic formations from the Snowdon Volcanic Group. The most prominent secondary summits are Moel yr Ogof (655 m), which contains a cave traditionally associated with Owain Glyndŵr, and Moel Lefn (638 m). As a Marilyn, Hewitt and Nuttall, Moel Hebog is a popular destination for hillwalkers, offering expansive views of Snowdon and the surrounding landscape.

== Geology ==
Moel Hebog stands at 2,566 feet (782 metres) above sea level in North Wales, forming a major peak in the region between succession of Cambrian and Ordovician rocks that have been extensively studied to understand the geological evolution of North Wales. On Moel yr Ogof can be found Owain Glyndŵr's Cave.

=== Stratigraphy ===
The stratigraphical sequence begins with the inliers throughout the area. These beds consist of greenish‑grey to bluish‑grey slates with distinctive layers of siltstone locally known as "ringers". In the northern exposures, these beds also contain distinct quartzite layers, some of which are pebbly near their tops. The Ffestiniog Beds are topped by the Lingulella Band, a horizon about 55 ft (17 m) thick containing abundant specimens of the brachiopod species Lingulella davisi. Above this, in some locations, lie the Dolgelly Beds, which contain a diverse fauna including trilobites such as Briscoia celtica, Conokephalina abdita and Parabolina species, along with brachiopods like Orusia lenticularis. These fossils indicate the lower portion of the Dolgelly Beds, specifically the zone of Parabolina spinulosa.

Tremadocian rocks extend into the area along the Ynyscynhaiarn anticline, with the most fossiliferous exposures showing delicately striped leaden‑grey blocky mudstones containing trilobites such as Asaphellus homfrayi and Agnostus calvus and various brachiopods. These mudstones belong to the Portmadoc Flags Formation, a locally recognised Tremadocian unit of thinly bedded, fossil‑rich mudstones and siltstones deposited in an offshore marine environment. The junction between Cambrian and Ordovician rocks remains uncertain, as many contacts appear to be faulted or slipped, though the overall pattern shows Ordovician rocks overstepping Cambrian towards the north‑west, a trend seen throughout Caernarfonshire.

The Ordovician sequence begins with the Pennant Slates and Quartzites, followed by the Maesgwm Slates of cleavage characterised by closely spaced, discontinuous partings that produce thin, flake‑like layers—grading upward into softer slates showing streaky alternations of dark grey and greenish‑grey material. These beds have yielded Didymograptus murchisoni and D. geminus.

=== Volcanic and intrusive rocks ===
A significant feature of Moel Hebog is the Snowdon Volcanic Group, which forms much of the mountain's upper reaches. The volcanic sequence closely resembles that on rhyolitic series separated by a basic series. It begins with the distinctive feldspathic streaks showing characteristic 5 ft (1.5 m) across, basic tuffs and the Moel yr Ogof Basalts—a sequence of at least five basaltic lava flows well exposed in cliffs on the south side of Moel yr Ogof. Chemical analyses show these to be distinctly alkaline synclinal outlier south of the summit of Moel yr Ogof.

The area contains numerous igneous intrusions of two main age groups: those related to the Caradocian Snowdonian volcanism and those emplaced during the Caledonian orogeny. The largest rhyolite mass around Castell appears nearly concordant on the map but is discordant at smaller scales. The Moel yr Ogof intrusion forms a neck or plug cutting through the youngest exposed rocks in the Hebog syncline, with explosion breccias suggesting a former volcanic vent. Later Caledonian intrusions include microgranophyre sheets along the western side of the Hebog syncline, microgranites, porphyrites, quartz porphyry dikes, and widespread ophitic dolerites cutting many faults, indicating late‑stage intrusion during Caledonian deformation.

The distribution of rocks is primarily controlled by folding, the most important being the Hebog syncline—a continuation of the Snowdon syncline. This fold contains the volcanic rocks at the area's core and is accompanied by other folds such as the Moel Ddu syncline, the Llwydmawr syncline and the Ynyscynhaiarn anticline. Detailed geological mapping here has linked previously mapped areas of Snowdon, Tremadog and Nantlle, greatly enhancing understanding of the Lower Palaeozoic interplay of sedimentation, volcanism and deformation in Britain.
