= Coedydd Maentwrog National Nature Reserve =

Protected area in Wales

Coordinates: 52.965°N 3.974°W

Coedydd Maentwrog, on the north side of the Vale of Ffestiniog, is the largest wood in the Vale (which runs from the coast at Porthmadog inland to Blaenau Ffestiniog in Gwynedd). The national nature reserve consists of two separate sections: Coed Llyn Mair, and a group of three forests (Coed Ty Coch, Coed Bronturnor and Coed Glanrafon). It offers a variety of habitats, rising from the wooded valley onto open moorland and reaching towards the foot of Moelwyn Bach mountain. A nature trail and a network of public footpaths (some of which are steep and slippery when wet) are features of the reserve. Animals such as the rare lesser horseshoe bat and the wood warbler can be spotted here, and the gorge is noted for its liverworts and lichens.

The reserve is located near Maentwrog, and is accessible by car via the A487. It may also be reached year-round by bus and by train from Easter to November, with occasional service during Christmastime and school holidays.
