= Yr Arddu (North) =

Hill in Conwy County Borough, Wales

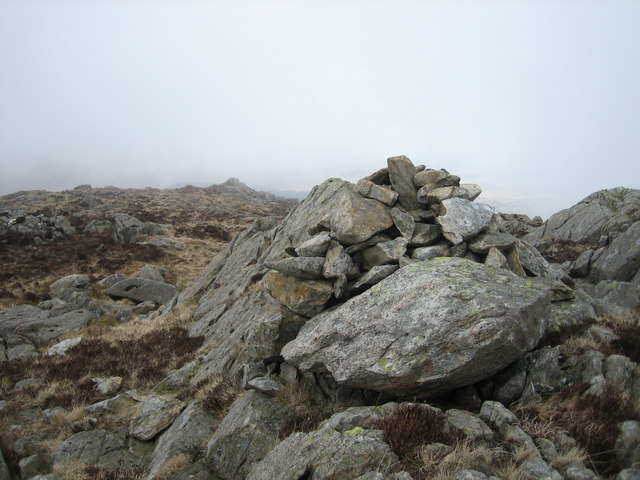
- Yr Arddu Summit

Highest point
- Elevation: 589 m (1,932 ft)
- Prominence: 37 m (121 ft)
- Coordinates: 53.04°N 3.98°W

Naming
- Language of name: Welsh

Geography
- Location: Conwy, Wales
- Parent range: Snowdonia
- OS grid: SH673507

Climbing
- Easiest route: Hike

Yr Arddu is a mountain summit found in the Moelwynion in Snowdonia; grid reference SH673507.

The height of the summit above sea level is 589 meters (1932 ft). The height was measured and confirmed on March 10, 2007.

This summit should not be confused with Yr Arddu (South).
