= Moel yr Ogof =

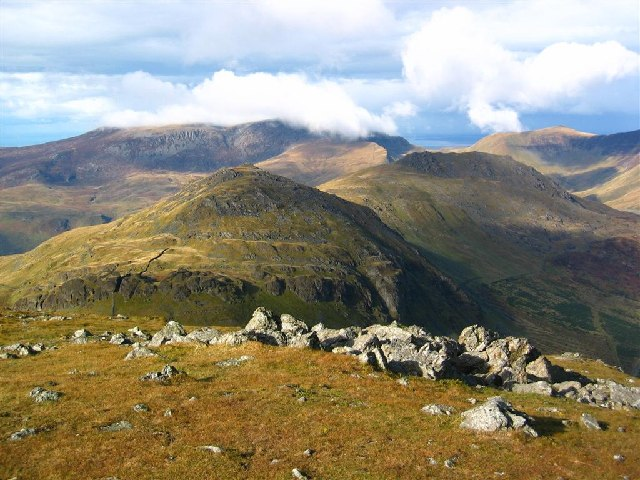
- Moel yr Ogof from Moel Hebog with Moel Lefn behind.

Highest point
- Elevation: 655 m (2,149 ft)
- Prominence: 118 m (387 ft)
- Parent peak: Moel Hebog
- Listing: Hewitt, Nuttall, HuMP
- Coordinates: 53.0086°N 4.1534°W

Naming
- English translation: hill of the cave
- Language of name: Welsh

Geography
- Location: Snowdonia, Gwynedd, Wales
- Parent range: Moel Hebog
- OS grid: SH565469
- Topo map: OS Landranger 115

Moel yr Ogof is a summit in Snowdonia, Wales. It is a subsidiary summit of Moel Hebog and a sister peak to the lower Moel Lefn.

There is an asbestos trial mine located on the summit. A small seam of white asbestos was discovered however insufficient amounts to commercially mine.

== Geology ==
The summit of Moel yr Ogof is composed of a brecciated rhyolite, diagnostic of gravitational collapse in a rhyolite dome.

Surrounding the crown of the mount is a geological unit consisting of alternating bands, of varying thickness, of pillow basalts and a green/grey sandstone that is of mafic origin, potentially derived from the pillow basalt itself.

The pillow basalt is relatively well preserved in places, where devitrification rims clearly outline the individual pillows. It is composed of dark green/black, very fine crystalline, basaltic rock, which has weathered to a dark red/brown colouration due to the presence of iron minerals.

The sandstone member of the unit is a pale green/grey, fine to medium grained, well sorted sandstone. It shows good cross-bedding and rare ripple structures indicating a tidal depositional environment.

There is a large scale syncline running NNE-SSW, that extends straight through the summit of Moel yr Ogof and can be seen clearly, in the mountain's profile, when taking the path up to the Hebog ridge from the South.

Owain Glyndŵr's cave can be found on the cliff at the eastern flank of the mountain. The Beddgelert Forest lies directly to the north east, while Cwm Pennant lies to the west. Good views of the Nantlle ridge to the north are observed.
