= Tŷ Canol Wood =

Woodland in Pembrokeshire, Wales

Coordinates: 51.99804°N 4.78360°W

Tŷ Canol Woods are an ancient woodland in the Tŷ Canol National Nature Reserve which lies south of the village of Felindre Farchog, Pembrokeshire, Wales, between the Preseli Mountains and the north Pembrokeshire coast. The site is designated as an SSSI (Site of Special Scientific Interest), NNR (National Nature Reserve) and SAC (Special Area of Conservation).

After the glaciers made their final retreat from Wales around 11,500 years ago, it took time to transform the barren landscape into a lush woodland. But gradually Arctic plants were joined by shrubs, then progressively birch, Scots pine, oak, alder and hazel trees colonised. By around 6,000 years ago, an extensive deciduous woodland may have covered even the uplands of Wales. 1,000 years later the woodlands started to diminish in size and number thanks to natural and human influences. With trees over 800 years old, Tŷ Canol is one of the few remaining ancient woodlands in Wales. The site is important not only for its ancient oaks, but also for the many rocky outcrops. Both trees and rocks are covered with mosses and nearly 400 species of lichen, many of which are rare.

Biofluorescence, seen under UV light under the dark sky, is a feature that has led the wood to be described as "...one of the most magical and special woodlands in the UK."
