= Yr Arddu (South) =

Hill in Snowdonia, Wales

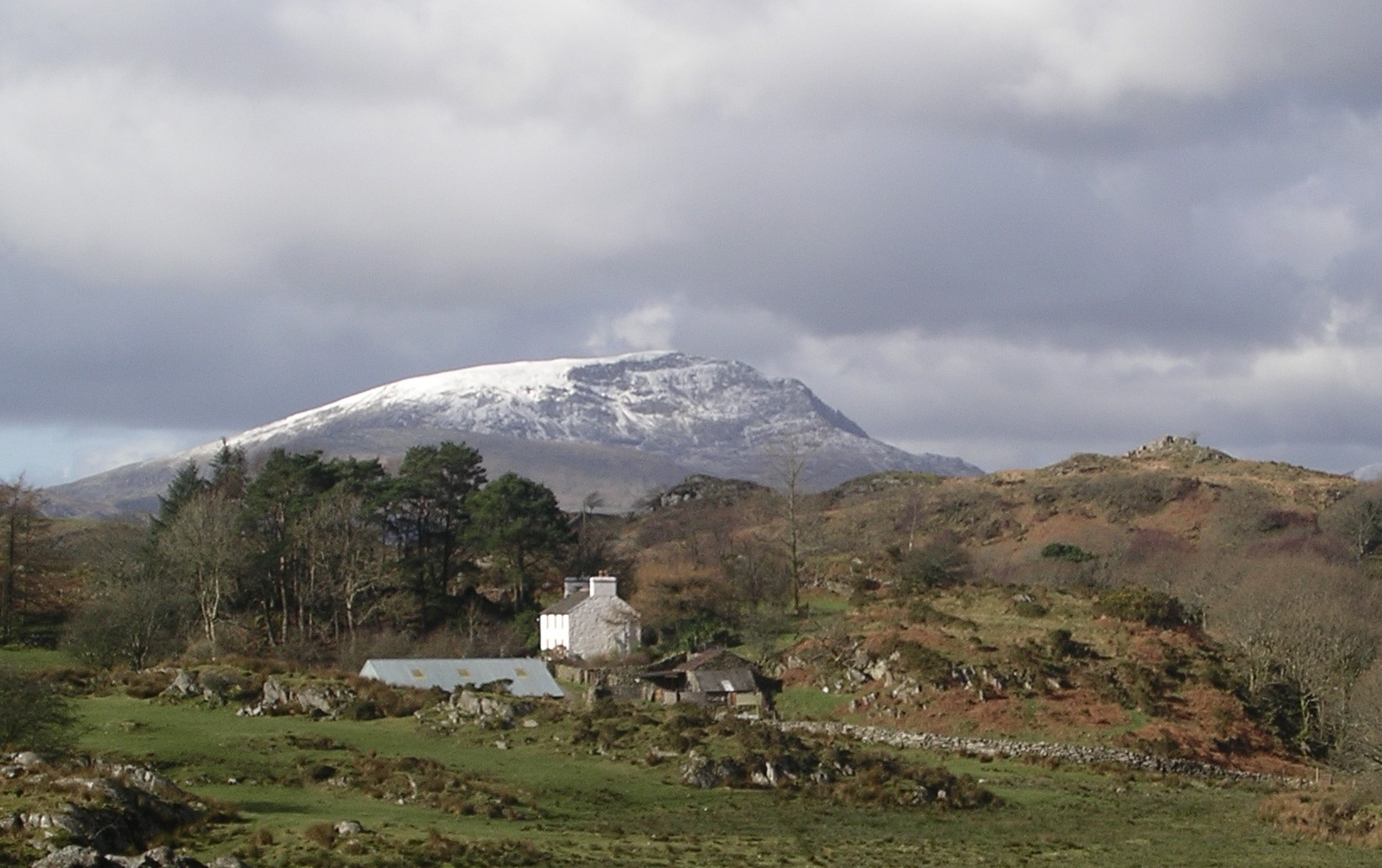
- Yr Arddu from the Rhyd Road

Highest point
- Elevation: 388 m (1,273 ft)
- Parent peak: Moelwyn Mawr
- Coordinates: 52.9958°N 4.0479°W

Naming
- Language of name: Welsh

Geography
- Location: Gwynedd, Wales
- Parent range: Snowdonia
- OS grid: SH627462
- Topo map: OS Landranger 124, Explorer OL17

Climbing
- Easiest route: Hike

Yr Arddu is a large hill in Snowdonia, Wales (Not to be confused with the 589 metre Yr Arddu (North) to the east of Snowdon). It lies approximately 2.5 km south east of the village of Beddgelert and just over 1 km from the rather more famous mountain Cnicht. It is a rugged hill with widespread rock outcrops and cliffs. A small lake, Llyn yr Arddu, is located on the flanks of the mountain. The recognised summit is at 388m to the South of the hill, but the highest point, named Cerrig-y-Myllt on only the most detailed UK Ordnance Survey mapping, is at 463m above the two small lakes to the North of the hill. The craggy nature of the hill is due to the presence of lavas and tuffs (volcanic ash deposits) dating from the Ordovician period when Snowdonia was characterised by numerous volcanic eruptions; Yr Arddu is a particularly good location to see the record of Ordovician volcanism. The Yr Arddu Tuffs may be the earliest eruptive phase of the Lower Rhyolitic Tuff Formation.

The whole hill is a site of special scientific interest designated by the Countryside Council for Wales.

Yr Arddu is commonly approached by a footpath leaving the minor road that links Nantmor to Nant Gwynant running along the valley of Blaen Nanmor, but the final 0.5 km has no paths marked on UK Ordnance Survey mapping. However, a marked path runs South East from Nantmor Mountain Centre at Gelli-Iago. From this an intermittent rough path runs from West of Clogwyn Coch up to the two small lakes. The hill can also be approached with more difficulty from its West flank up to the small lake Llyn yr Arddu.

== See also ==
"Location on Streemap".
