= Coed Cymerau National Nature Reserve =

Nature reserve in Wales

Coordinates: 52.966°N 3.957°W

- IUCN category IV (habitat/species management area)
- Interactive map of Coed Cymerau National Nature Reserve
- Area: 26.31 ha (65.0 acres)
- Established: 3 June 1969
- Governing body: Natural Resources Wales (NRW)

Coed Cymerau National Nature Reserve is a wooded area of approximately 26 hectares on the north side of the Vale of Ffestiniog through which the River Goedol runs. There is one path that runs through the forest but the rest of the area is primarily native broadleaved woodland and thick undergrowth, adjacent to the nature reserve is Coed Cymerau Isaf which is owned by the Woodland Trust.
