= Pengelli National Nature Reserve =

Woodland in Wales

Coordinates: 52°01′01″N 4°43′26″W

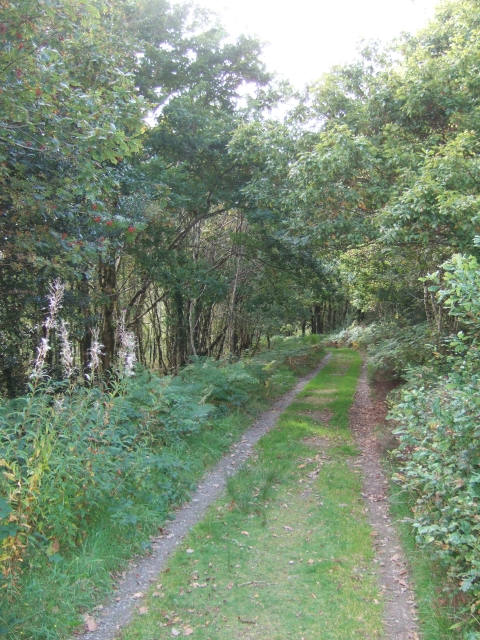
Path in Pengelli Forest

Pengelli National Nature Reserve is part of the largest block of ancient oak woodland in West Wales. It has survived for hundreds of years, despite being modified by people. Lying near the village of Eglwyswrw in the north of Pembrokeshire, it makes up part of the gentle agricultural landscape which lies between the foot of the Preseli hills and the sea. Species found in this rich woodland include badgers, polecats and the elusive dormouse.

The woodland was owned during Elizabethan times by the Pembrokeshire historian George Owen of Henllys. The woodland was designated as a National Nature Reserve in 1995.

In 2021, the Wildlife Trust of South and West Wales (WTSWW) purchased the adjacent 33-acre Pencnwc Mawr Wood. A further 13 acres of adjacent land was purchased by WTSWW in 2023 with the intention of expanding the woodland.
