= Whiteford National Nature Reserve =

Nature reserve in Wales

Coordinates: 51°38′16″N 4°14′49″W

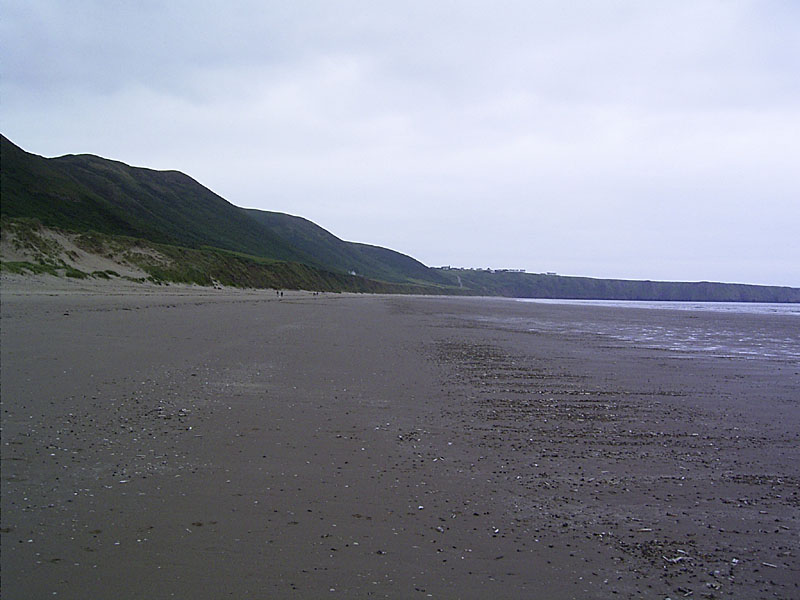
Whiteford Sands, Gower, Wales, UK

Whiteford National Nature Reserve includes an expanse of sandy beach, Whiteford Sands, a wildlife rich sand dune system and forest.

The 3-kilometre stretch of sand that curves gently from the cliffs of Broughton Bay towards the poetically isolated Whiteford Lighthouse is one of the quietest spots on the Gower Peninsula.

The reserve's various mudflats, sands and salt marshes make it one of the most important wintering areas in Wales for wildfowl and wading birds.
