= Cors Caron =

Raised bog in Ceredigion, Wales

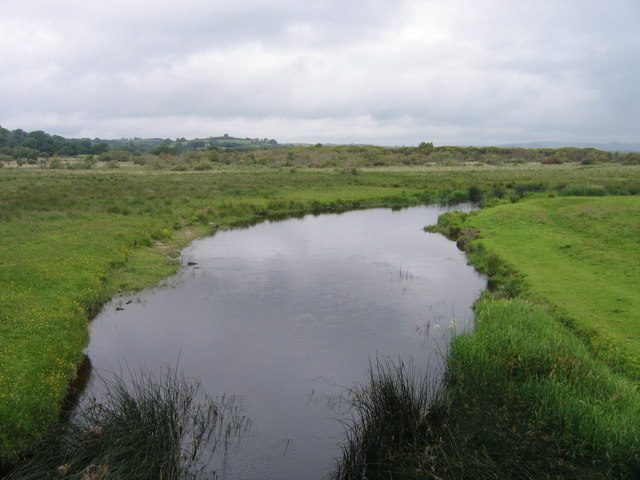
- River Teifi and Cors Caron from Pont Einon
- Interactive map of Cors Caron
- Location: Ceredigion, Wales
- Coordinates: 52.234698°N 3.947980°W
- Governing body: Natural Resources Wales

Cors Caron is a raised bog in Ceredigion, Wales. Cors is the Welsh word for "bog". Cors Caron covers an area of approximately 349 hectares (862 acres). Cors Caron represents the most intact surviving example of a raised bog landscape in the United Kingdom. About 44 different species groups inhabit the area including various land and aquatic plants, fish, insects, crustaceans, lichen, fungi, terrestrial mammals and birds.

== History ==
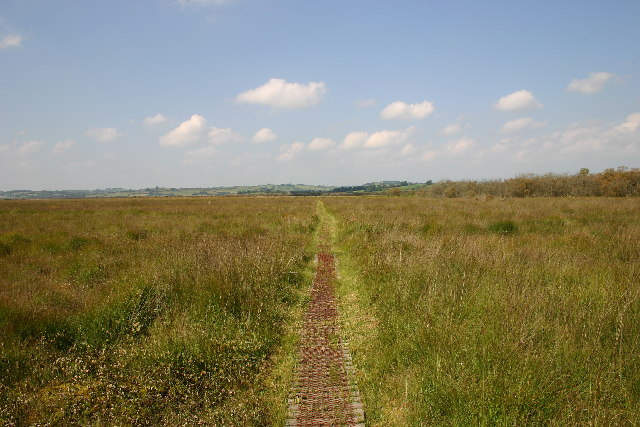
The boardwalk leads across the bog. It is for the use of permit holders only as it leads across a treacherous area.

Cors Caron began to be formed 12,000 years ago, at the end of the last glacial period. A raised bog of this type develops from a lake or flat marshy area, over either non-acidic or acidic substrates. Over centuries there is a progression from open lake, to marsh and then fen (or on acidic substrates, valley bog), as silt or peat fill the lake. Eventually, peat builds up to a level where the land surface is too flat for ground or surface water to reach the centre of the wetland. Trees in the area that died (in about 3000 BC) and were preserved by the conditions in the bog are being studied by scientists looking for information on the past climate of the area.

For many centuries the peat in bogs was cut out and harvested for use as a heating fuel. Many bog ecosystems were completely destroyed by this practice. As a result of international concern, Cors Caron was designated as a national nature reserve in 1955. Formerly in the ownership of the Trawsgoed Estate, and the Earl of Lisburne, the bog is located in the 2,000-acre (8.1 km^{2}) Cors Caron National Nature Reserve. In 1956, the 7th Earl of Lisburne entered into a management agreement with the Nature Conservancy Council, and the reserve lands were sold to the Countryside Council for Wales in 1986. The estate retains grazing and sporting rights over some 700 acres (2.8 km^{2}) of the reserve and adjoining farmland. On 2 September 1992, Cors Caron was put on a list of wetland sites of international importance under the Ramsar Convention. The bog is now maintained by Natural Resources Wales, successor body to the Countryside Council for Wales.

== General site characteristics ==
- Inland water bodies (standing water, running water) (2%)
- Bogs, marshes, water fringed vegetation, ferns (70%)
- Humid grassland, mesophile grassland (21%)
- Broad-leaved deciduous woodland (7%)

=== Primary habitats (priority) feature ===
The assessment designated the primary feature for the selection of Cors Caron as active raised bog described as:

The Cors Caron sequence of peat domes (also known as Tregaron Bog) developed on the floodplain of the Afon (River) Teifi in mid-Wales now represents the most intact surviving example in the UK of a raised bog landscape (macrotope). The three main extant domes are hydrologically isolated by the River Teifi and associated surface drainage features, and all three have suffered extensive damage as a consequence of past drainage and peat-cutting. The river terraces associated with the component bog mesotopes are regularly flooded and support vegetation that includes reed canary-grass Phalaris arundinacea, soft rush Juncus effusus, purple moor-grass Molinia caerulea and, more rarely, water sedge Carex aquatilis. Substantial areas of the surface of each of the three component bogs still retain good quality active raised bog vegetation mainly referable to NVC type M18 Sphagnum papillosum – Erica tetralix community, with frequent bog-rosemary Andromeda polifolia and white beak-sedge Rhynchospora alba and, more locally, the bog-mosses Sphagnum magellanicum and S. pulchrum. Extensive areas with a high cover of heather Calluna vulgaris and deergrass Trichophorum cespitosum are also present, while purple moor-grass M. caerulea is particularly prominent on the more modified bog margins. Although present as an important peat-former until as recently as the 18th century, Sphagnum imbricatum is absent from the contemporary bog flora.

==== Qualifying habitats (priority) feature ====
Bog woodland designation was a qualifying feature present described as:

Under certain combinations of physical circumstances in the UK, scattered trees can occur across the surface of a bog in a relatively stable ecological relationship as open woodland, without the loss of bog species. This true Bog woodland is a much rarer condition than the progressive invasion of bogs by trees, through natural colonisation or afforestation following changes in the drainage pattern which leads eventually to the loss of the bog community. The habitat type has not previously been well described in the UK, and consequently knowledge of its ecological characteristics is limited. The principal tree species in this form of Bog woodland is Scots pine Pinus sylvestris. Pine bog woodland types are likely to be intermediate in character between NVC type W18 Pinus sylvestris – Hylocomium splendens woodland and more open mire types such as M18 Erica tetralix – Sphagnum papillosum mire or M19 Calluna vulgaris – Eriophorum vaginatum blanket mire.

==== Qualifying habitats (non-priority) feature ====
Cors Caron was additionally assessed as possessing the following qualifying, non-priority habitats:

Transition mires and quaking bogs described as: The term 'transition mire' relates to vegetation that in floristic composition and general ecological characteristics is transitional between acid bog and 7230 Alkaline fens, in which the surface conditions range from markedly acidic to slightly base-rich. The vegetation normally has intimate mixtures of species considered to be acidophile and others thought of as calciphile or basophile. In some cases the mire occupies a physically transitional location between bog and fen vegetation, as for example on the marginal lagg of raised bog or associated with certain valley and basin mires. In other cases these intermediate properties may reflect the actual process of succession, as peat accumulates in groundwater-fed fen or open water to produce rainwater-fed bog isolated from groundwater influence. Many of these systems are very unstable underfoot and can therefore also be described as 'quaking bogs'.

Depressions on peat substrates of the Rhynchosporion described as: occurring in complex mosaics with lowland wet heath and valley mire vegetation, in transition mires, and on the margins of bog pools and hollows in both raised and blanket bogs. The vegetation is typically very open, usually characterised by an abundance of white beak-sedge Rhynchospora alba, often with well-developed algal mats, the bog moss Sphagnum denticulatum, round-leaved sundew Drosera rotundifolia and, in relatively base-rich sites, brown mosses such as Drepanocladus revolvens and Scorpidium scorpioides. The nationally scarce species brown beak-sedge Rhynchospora fusca and marsh clubmoss Lycopodiella inundata also occur in this habitat.

On lowland heaths in southern and eastern England this habitat occurs on humid, bare or recently exposed peat in three distinct situations:

- in and around the edges of seasonal bog pools, particularly on patterned areas of valley mire,
- in flushes on the edges of valley mires in heathlands, and
- in areas that are artificially disturbed, such as along footpaths and trackways and in old peat-cuttings and abandoned ditches.

=== Primary species ===
The habitation of otter (Lutra lutra) at Cors Caron was the primary species listed in the assessment. Cors Caron is one of the largest wetland areas in Wales and feeds into the River Teifi. Historically it is a very important site for otters and has been an important source of breeding for the otters of the River Teifi and other catchments such as the rivers Severn and Dyfi. Cors Caron also provides an important amphibian food resource for breeding otters in spring. One of the last UK strongholds of the European Polecat was in this area.

== Birdlife ==
Among the birdlife which can be seen at Cors Caron are buzzard, peregrine falcon, merlin, Eurasian sparrowhawk and hen harrier. There have also been rare sightings of Montagu's harrier. The reserve provides a habitat for the endangered red kite. Once nearly extinct, the bird of prey has made a dramatic resurgence in the area. The wetlands attract a variety of wild fowl such as the teal, curlew, and water rail. Snipe, red grouse, tree pipit, grasshopper warbler and whinchat can be seen more in the drier areas and the common redstart and willow warbler nest in the willow scrub.

== Visitor facilities ==
Visitor facilities at Cors Caron include three car parking areas, accessed from the B4343 road between Tregaron and Pontrhydfendigaid. There is a 3 km circular path using a boardwalk, and a 7 km riverside walk on a raised path. Alongside the reserve is a cycle path using the disused trackway of the former Aberystwyth to Carmarthen railway, which forms part of the Ystwyth Trail.

In 2005, construction started on a state-of-the-art bird hide at Cors Caron. Opened in February 2006, the hide provides a viewing point to observe wildlife, especially birds at close range. The bird hide was constructed from sustainably harvested materials, such as Welsh oak. The £80,000 cost of the project was covered by the European Union's Objective One Programme.

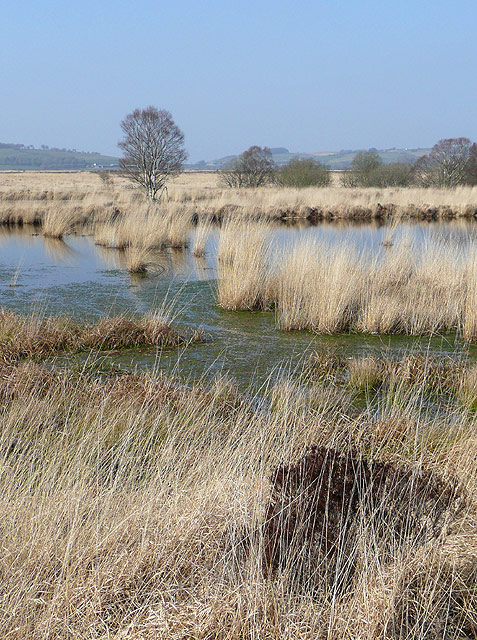

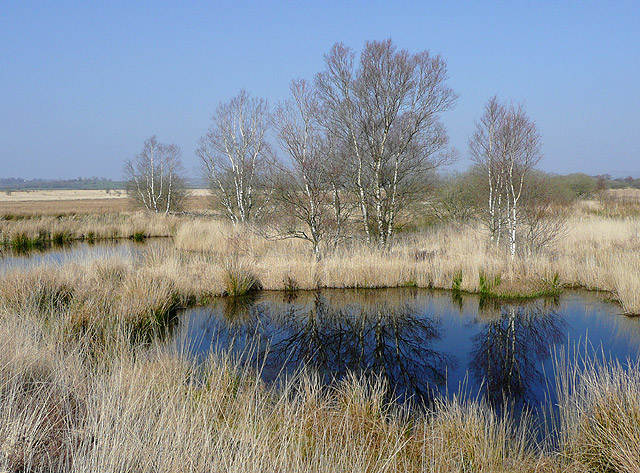

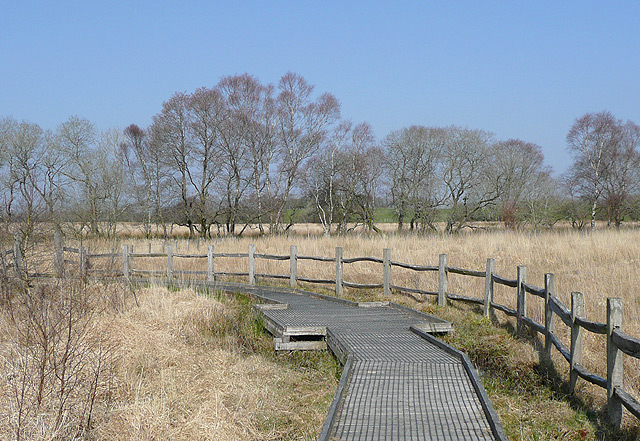

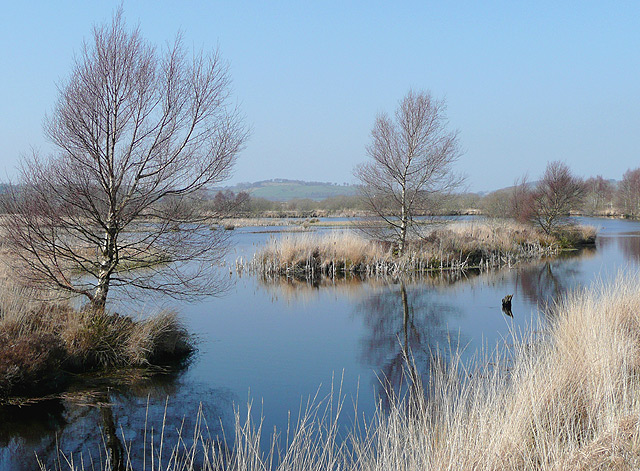
