= Tŷ Canol National Nature Reserve =

Nature reserve in Pembrokeshire, Wales

Coordinates: 51.995°N 4.784°W

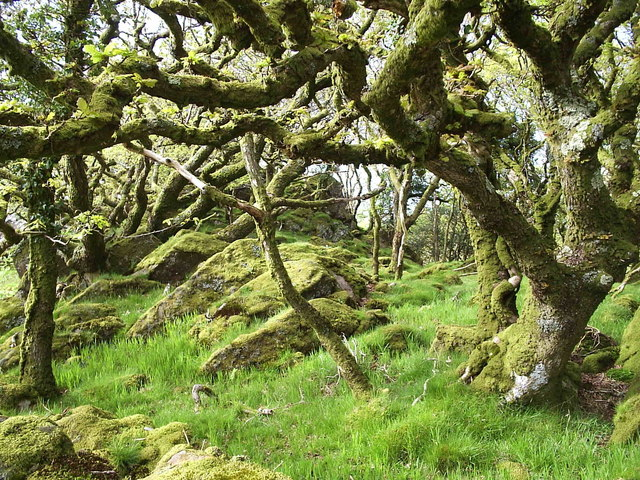

Tŷ Canol National Nature Reserve is a national nature reserve which lies south of the village of Felindre Farchog, Pembrokeshire, Wales, between the Preseli Mountains and the north Pembrokeshire coast. It is notable for its rich diversity of lichens, being home to over 400 species.

The volcanic rock of the moor of Carnedd Meibion Owain, the mossy boulders and gnarled oaks of Tŷ Canol Wood and the nearby presence of the Pentre Ifan burial chamber contribute to the reserve's prehistoric atmosphere. Buzzards and ravens are a common sight in the area.
