= Coed Rheidol National Nature Reserve =

Nature reserve in Ceredigion, Wales

Coordinates: 52.3834°N 3.8617°W

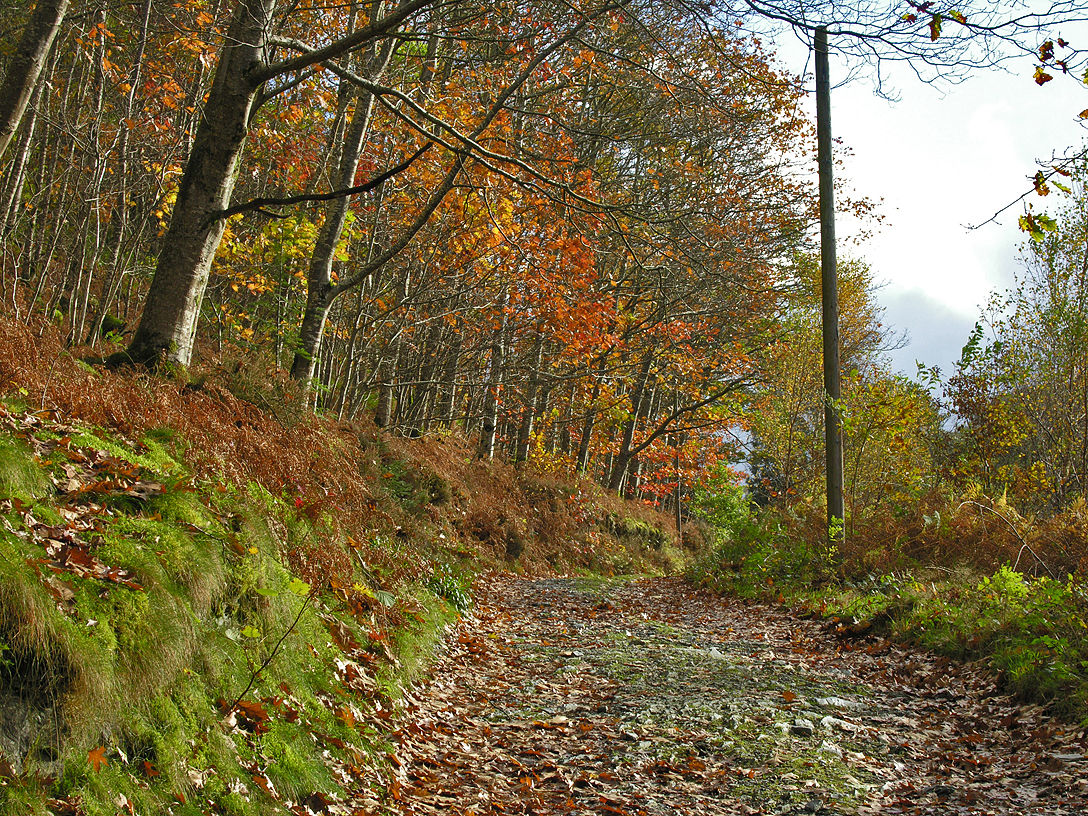
Track in Coed Rheidol.

Coed Rheidol National Nature Reserve forms part of a long ribbon of woodland adjoining the two rivers, Afon Rheidol and its tributary Afon Mynach, around the lower slopes of hills near Devil's Bridge, Ceredigion, Wales, about 10 miles or 16 km east of Aberystwyth.

At the bottom of the gorge the woods take on an ancient appearance with their steep rocky slopes and gnarled trees dripping with moss. It is a picturesque landscape with views of the Rheidol waterfall and valley from the top of this reserve.
