= Cors y Llyn National Nature Reserve =

Protected area in Wales

Coordinates: 52.1874°N 3.4403°W

Cors y Llyn National Nature Reserve can be found about 2.5 kilometres south of Newbridge on Wye, off the A470 road in mid-Wales.

The bogs and open water at the centre of the reserve are enclosed by a band of trees, which are surrounded by an area of pasture. The meadow at the site's entrance is one of the richest in wild flowers in Mid Wales.
