= Allt y Benglog National Nature Reserve =

Nature reserve in Wales

Coordinates: 52°47′45″N 3°46′10″W

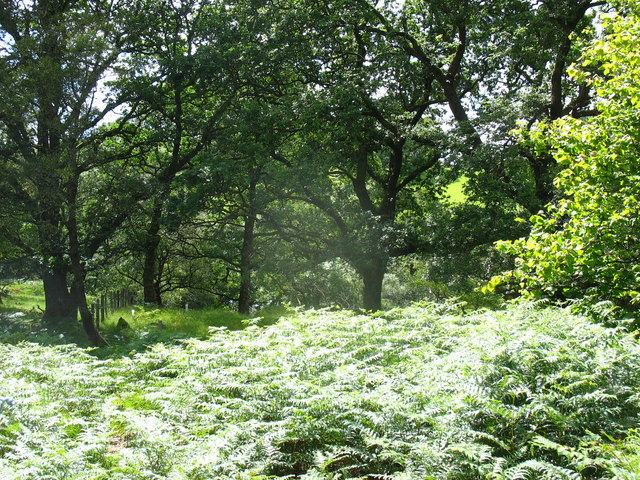

Allt y Benglog is a small national nature reserve near Dolgellau in Wales.

Its position on the lower slopes of Rhobell Fawr, one of north Wales’ extinct volcanoes, results in an unusual mix of plants and trees which spring from its subterranean mix of volcanic rocks. A permanently damp atmosphere is created through a combination of numerous waterfalls and good tree coverage, and allows an unusually rich variety of moisture-loving mosses, plants and trees to thrive.
