= Coed y Rhygen National Nature Reserve =

Protected area in Wales

Coordinates: 52.914°N 3.965°W

- IUCN category IV (habitat/species management area)
- Interactive map of Coed y Rhygen National Nature Reserve
- Area: 2.78 ha (6.9 acres)
- Established: 3 June 1969
- Governing body: Natural Resources Wales (NRW)

Coed y Rhygen National Nature Reserve is located on the western shore of Llyn Trawsfynydd in Gwynedd, North Wales. As an example of Atlantic Rainforest, it is very wet and there are many different examples of mosses and liverworts that cover the ground and the trees. The reserve covers 2.78 hectares, is privately owned and is not open to the public.

== Description and history ==
The reserve lies on the steep, boulder-strewn north- and north-eastern slopes of Snowdonia National Park in Gwynedd, Wales, between about 200 m and 260 m above sea level. The reserve is underlain by coarse-grained greywacke, grit and sandstone, and is dominated by an old-growth canopy of sessile oak (Quercus petraea) and downy birch (Betula pubescens), with veteran oaks aged up to 350 years mixed with areas of coppice and younger regrowth. Pollen analysis from a small hollow in the wood shows that, over the past 1,500 years, the site underwent phases of partial canopy opening—likely managed as a grazed park in medieval and post-medieval times—followed by periods of rapid natural regeneration restoring a closed canopy. Documentary evidence (the Record of Caernarvon of AD 1420) confirms human occupation of the area by at least the early 15th century.

== Biodiversity ==
Despite this history of disturbance, Coed y Rhygen supports one of Britain's richest Atlantic bryophyte (mosses, hornworts, and liverworts) assemblages, with more than 20 moisture-loving liverwort and moss species recorded. Among the rarer taxa are Adelanthus decipiens. Plagiochila punctata, Lepidozia cupressina, Hypnum callichroum and Dicranum scottianum. These Atlantic specialists persist in the permanently humid, shaded microhabitats of north-facing rock cliffs and seepages.

Instrumentation at Coed y Rhygen has further refined the understanding of fine-scale habitat. Callaghan (2024) deployed data-loggers on ten trunks of Quercus petraea and Betula pubescens, recording temperature, relative humidity, vapour-pressure deficit (VPD) and illuminance on both north- and south-facing aspects from 2020–2022. He found that the hyperoceanic liverwort Leptoscyphus cuneifolius is significantly more abundant on north-facing bark, where lower VPD and reduced irradiance maintain stable high humidity. In early spring, southerly aspects show sharp peaks in solar radiation and VPD as the deciduous canopy leafs out, suggesting that shaded north-facing microhabitats act as critical refugia for this drought-sensitive species under a warming climate.
