= Llyn Gwernan =

Lake in Gwynedd, Wales

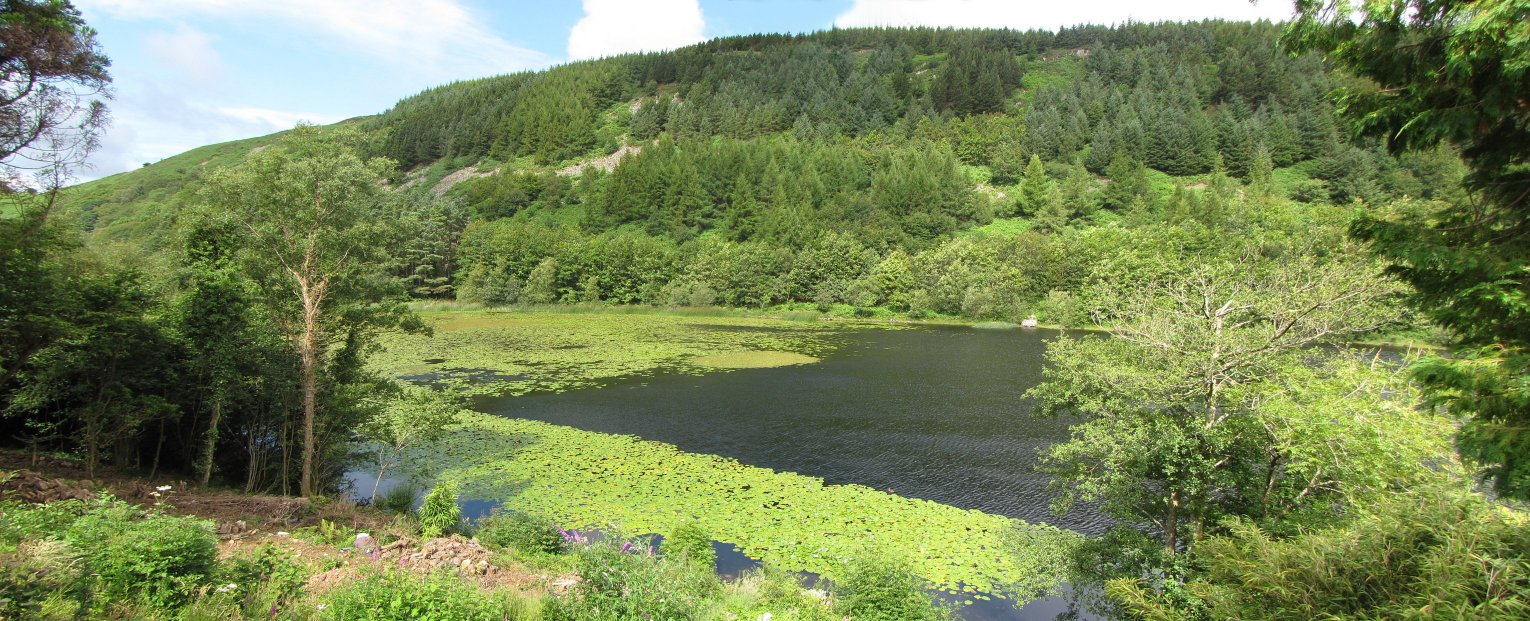
- View of Llyn Gwernan

- Location within Gwynedd
- Location: Wales
- Coordinates: 52°43′32″N 3°55′17″W
- Basin countries: United Kingdom
- Surface area: 3 ha (7.4 acres)
- Settlements: Dolgellau

Llyn Gwernan is a lake in Gwynedd, Wales and an important geological site, notable for an unusual thickness of Devensian Late-glacial organic deposits.
