= Cors Goch National Nature Reserve (Llanllwch) =

Nature reserve in Carmarthenshire, Wales

Coordinates: 51°50′33″N 4°22′30″W

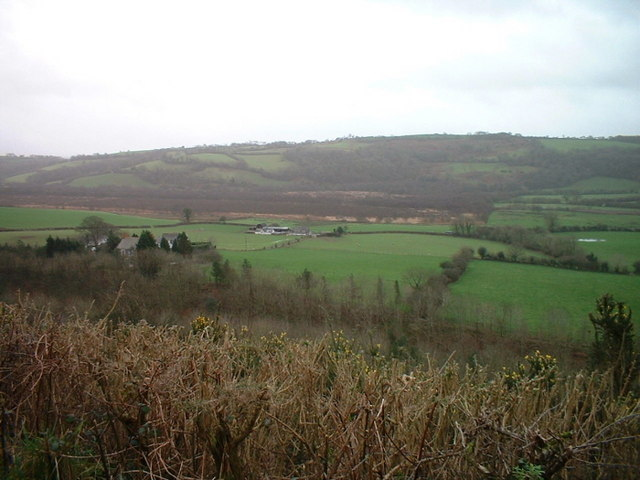
Cors Goch in the middle distance

Cors Goch National Nature Reserve, a couple of miles west of Carmarthen and near the hamlet of Llanllwch, is one of the few raised bogs in West Wales. It is a Site of Special Scientific Interest (SSSI).

Formed through the accumulation of the remains of plants, and later on peat, it reaches a depth of 5 metres in some places. Its various types of wet and dry habitats are home to a wealth of wildlife, from insect-eating intermediate sundews, to buzzards and kestrels.
