= Afon Erch =

River in Gwynedd, Wales

Coordinates: 52°53′27″N 4°24′27″W

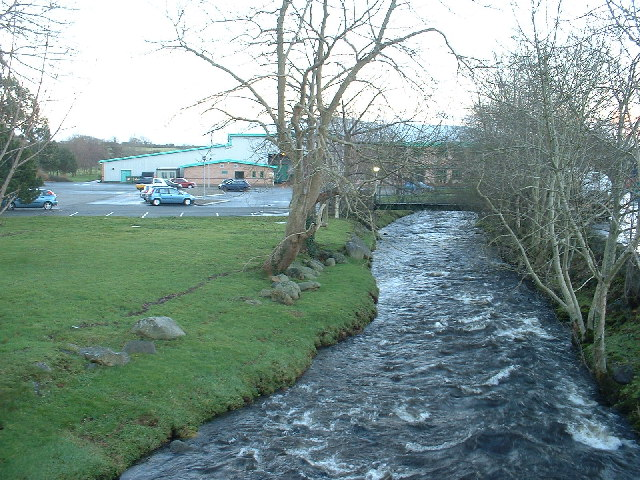
Afon Erch near the Caernarfon Creamery

The Afon Erch is a short river on the Llŷn peninsula, Gwynedd, Wales. It arises near the village of Llanaelhaearn, flowing south and southwest towards the hamlet of Llwyndyrys where it turns abruptly eastwards and curves around to the south, passing to the east of Y Ffor at Rhyd-y-gwystl. It continues towarin a SSW direction towards Abererch where despite the village name, it does not enter the sea but flows west parallel to the coast for 1 mile to Pwllheli. The Afon Rhyd-hir (translates from Welsh as 'river of the long ford') joins the Afon Erch within the tidal basin of Pwllheli Harbour. Its headwaters gather to the south of Llithfaen and flow south past Llannor to approach Pwllheli from the west. It is joined by the Afon Penrhos immediately west of the town, having originated around the extensive bog of Cors Geirch, a national nature reserve. Parts of the courses of each of these rivers occupy valleys that were formed by glacial meltwater. The uppermost Penrhos is a misfit stream within its valley.

The name of the Erch either signifies 'dappled/dark' or is possibly a personal name. Until the 16th century Aber-erch did sit at the point at which the river entered the sea but the longshore drift of the sands of Morfa Abererch diverted it west thereafter.
