= Cors Goch National Nature Reserve (Anglesey) =

Protected area in Anglesey, Wales

Coordinates: 53.3083°N 4.2528°W

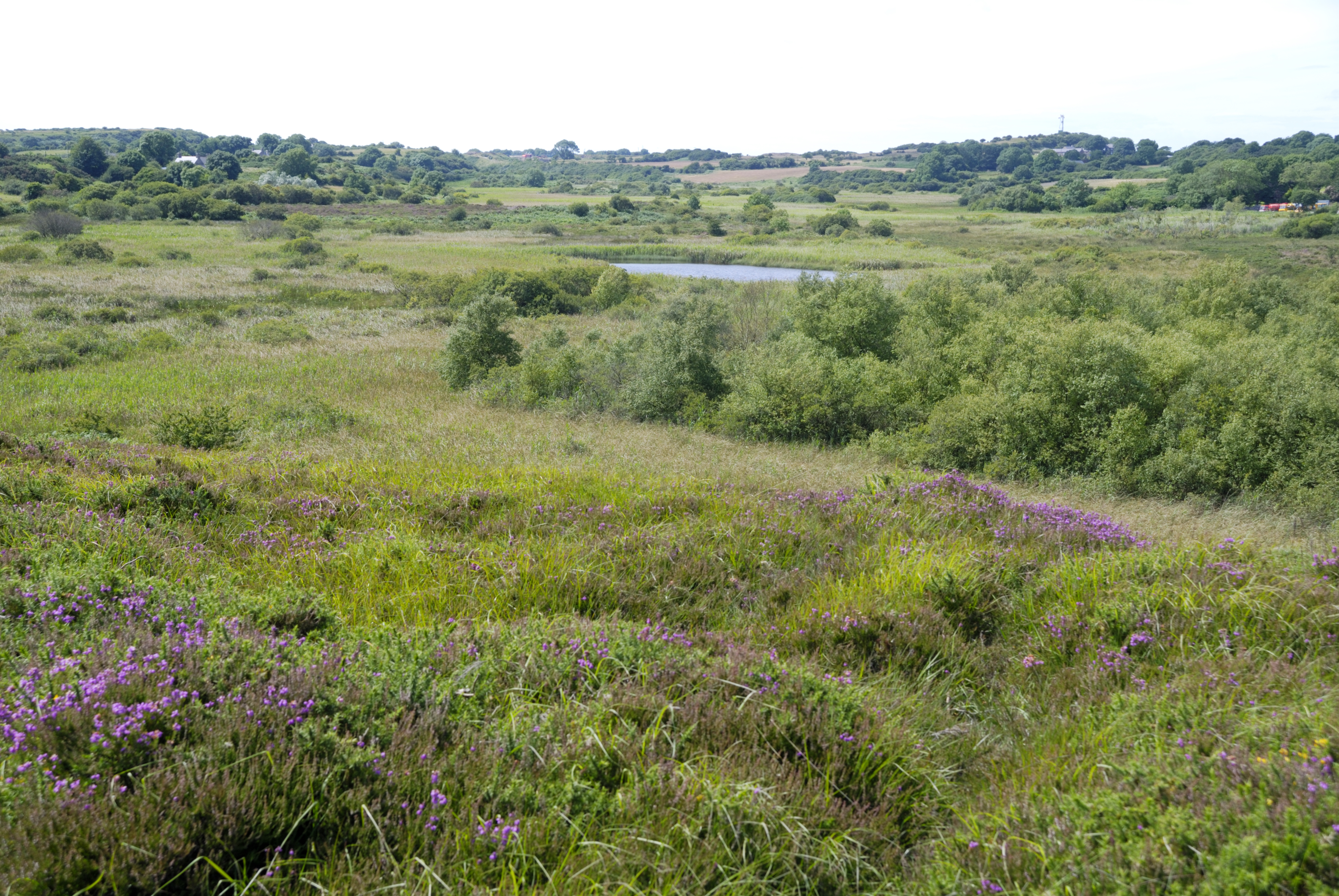
A view across Cors Goch, Anglesey, Wales.jpg

Cors Goch National Nature Reserve is principally a fen in a shallow valley near the village of Llanbedrgoch, on the eastern side of Anglesey. The site is managed by the North Wales Wildlife Trust and also includes calcareous heath, meadow and an acid heath overlain on millstone grit. There is some area of open water including Llyn Cadarn but much is marsh or shallow bog which supports a species rich ecosystem dominated by reeds. Over 2700 species have been recorded on the reserve including the medicinal leech and glow worm. A number of rare plants and animals are able to flourish in this environment, including great crested newt and adders. The site is managed by the North Wales Wildlife Trust.
