= Cors Gyfelog National Nature Reserve =

Wetland site in Gwynedd, Wales

- IUCN category IV (habitat/species management area)
- Location within Gwynedd Location within Wales Location within the United Kingdom
- Coordinates: 53.0056°N 4.295755°W
- Area: 36.97 ha (91.4 acres)
- Established: 23 January 2013
- Governing body: Natural Resources Wales (NRW)

Cors Gyfelog National Nature Reserve is a wetland site near the village of Pant Glas in the community of Clynnog, Gwynedd, Wales. It is important as a habitat for the marsh fritillary butterfly, as well as lesser redpoll and grasshopper warbler.

== Ecology and post-glacial development ==
Cors Gyfelog occupies a 68.2-hectare basin in the northern Llŷn Peninsula that began as a shallow lake immediately after the last ice age and rapidly infilled with peat in the early Holocene. Pollen and peat-stratigraphy studies show that during the Atlantic period the site expanded as a rich fen, then alternated between poor fen and alder carr woodland throughout much of the mid-Holocene. In the sub-Atlantic phase, reedswamp and early valley-bog communities developed before succession stabilised as sedge-dominated fen. More recent attempts at drainage have lowered water levels, allowing Molinia grass and willow scrub to invade drier patches. Continued monitoring, removal of invading scrub and careful water-level management are recommended to maintain its characteristic mesotrophic mire habitats.

== Biodiversity ==
Cors Gyfelog supports one of the largest mosaics of transition mire and quaking bog in Wales, interspersed with wet willow carr (Salix cinerea) and wet acid heath. Its sedge-rich fens are dominated by slender sedge (Carex lasiocarpa), white sedge (C. curta), common sedge (C. nigra), Bottle Sedge (C. rostrata) and the locally scarce mud sedge (C. limosa). A spectacular array of wetland wildflowers includes globeflower (Trollius europaeus), marsh helleborine (Epipactis palustris) and the tiny bog orchid (Hammarbya paludosa), alongside marsh violet (Viola palustris), marsh marigold (Caltha palustris), bog asphodel (Narthecium ossifragum), marsh cinquefoil (Comarum palustre), bogbean (Menyanthes trifoliata) and the uncommon royal fern (Osmunda regalis). These plant communities in turn sustain a suite of specialist invertebrates — particularly the silver fly (Acrometopia whalbergi) on slender sedge, marsh fritillary butterfly larvae feeding on devil's-bit scabious (Succisa pratensis), the snail-killing flies Tetanocera freyi and Antichaeta analis, and the aquatic weevil Bagous frit. Otter (Lutra lutra) and water vole (Arvicola terrestris) are regularly recorded along the site's two outflowing rivers, while grasshopper warblers and lesser redpolls breed in the drier carr and heath margins.
