= Coed Tremadog National Nature Reserve =

National nature reserve in Gwynedd, Wales

Coordinates: 52.945°N 4.140°W

Coed Tremadog National Nature Reserve is located near Porthmadog, Gwynedd, Wales. Its most striking features are huge volcanic cliffs which drop down to steep slopes of scree beneath. The rocks at the reserve are very unstable, and there is a significant danger from rockfalls. Although the site is dry and sunny, the deep rocky ravines and shade cast by trees allow damp-loving mosses and liverworts to thrive.
