= Ceunant Cynfal National Nature Reserve =

River gorge in Gwynedd, Wales

Coordinates: 52.949°N 3.944°W

Ceunant Cynfal National Nature Reserve is a river gorge which forms part of a wet wooded ravine of the Afon Cynfal near Ffestiniog in Gwynedd, Wales. The reserve is administered by Natural Resources Wales

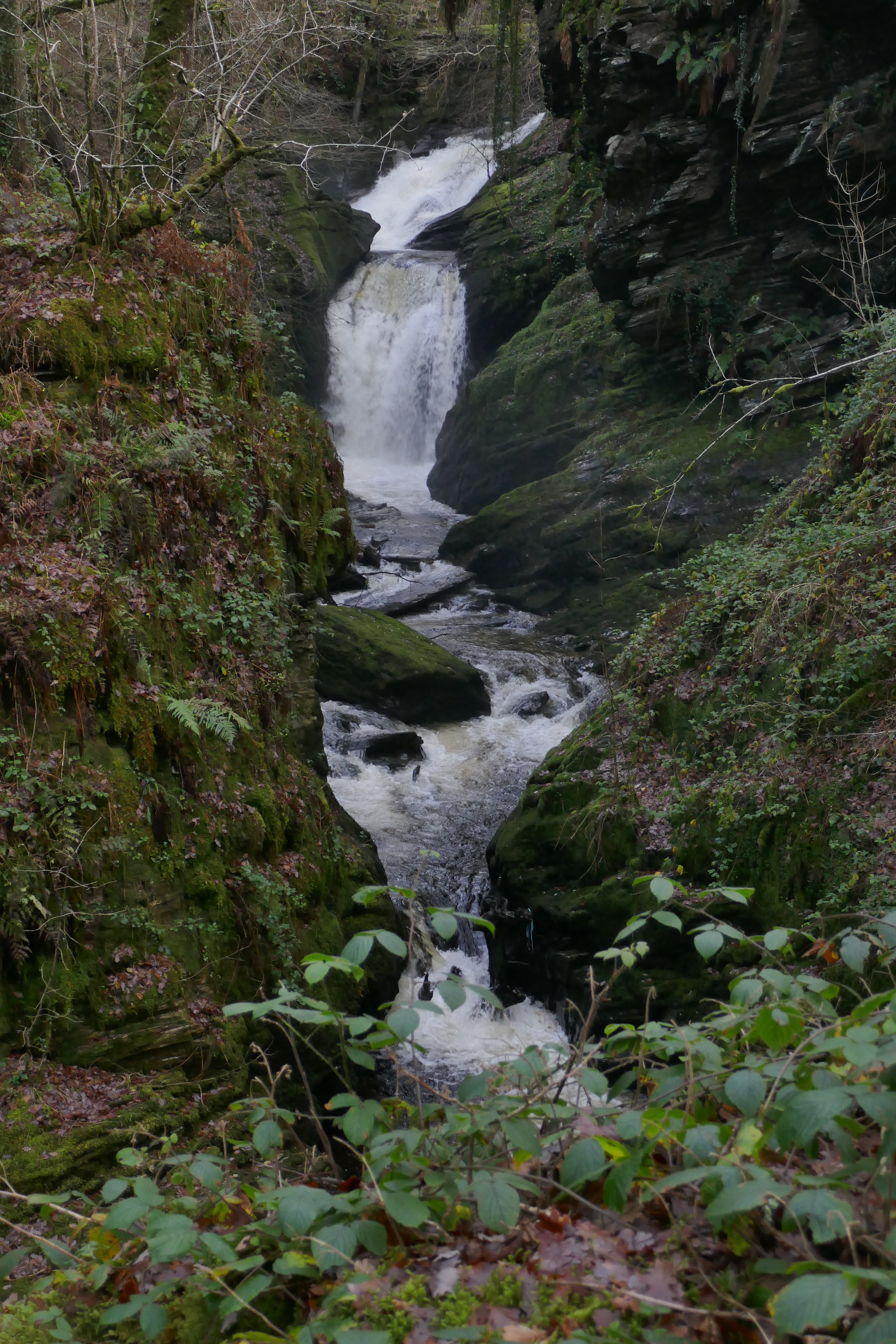
Afon Cynfal Gorge
