= Snowdon Volcanic Group =

- Stratigraphic range: Caradoc Ordovician
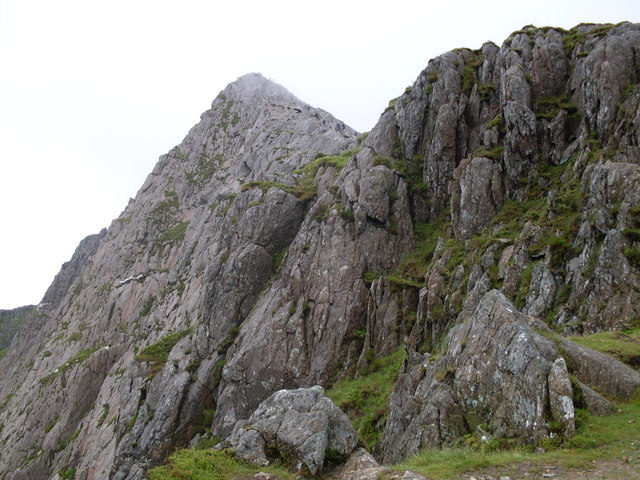
- Lower Rhyolitic Tuff Formation on the slopes of Y Lliwedd
- Type: Group
- Sub-units: Upper Crafnant Volcanic Formation, Middle Crafnant Volcanic Formation, Lower Crafnant Volcanic Formation, Tal y Fan Volcanic Formation, Bedded Pyroclastic Formation, Lower Rhyolitic Tuff Formation
- Underlies: Cadnant Shales Formation etc
- Overlies: Cwm Eigiau Formation
- Thickness: up to 1800 m

Lithology
- Primary: ash flow tuffs
- Other: basalt, mudstones, siltstones, hyaloclastite

Location
- Region: northwest Wales
- Country: Wales

Type section
- Named for: Snowdon

The Snowdon Volcanic Group is an Ordovician lithostratigraphic group (a sequence of rock strata) in Snowdonia, north-west Wales. The name is derived from Snowdon, the highest peak in Wales where it outcrops. This assemblage of rocks has also been referred to as the Snowdon Volcanic Series.

== Outcrops ==
The rocks occur across the Snowdon massif and to its south, southeast and west, around the eastern flanks of the Carneddau and within the Idwal syncline.

== Lithology and stratigraphy ==
The Group consists of up to 1800 m thickness of ash flow tuffs with sandstones, mudstones and siltstones and important basalt, hyaloclastites and breccias erupted or sedimented during the Caradocian Epoch of the Ordovician Period. The Group includes (in descending order, i.e. oldest last):

- Upper Crafnant Volcanic Formation
- Middle Crafnant Volcanic Formation
- Lower Crafnant Volcanic Formation

The Tal y Fan Volcanic Formation occurs towards the northeast and the Bedded Pyroclastic Formation and Lower Rhyolitic Tuff Formation occur to the southwest.
