= River Teifi =

River in Wales

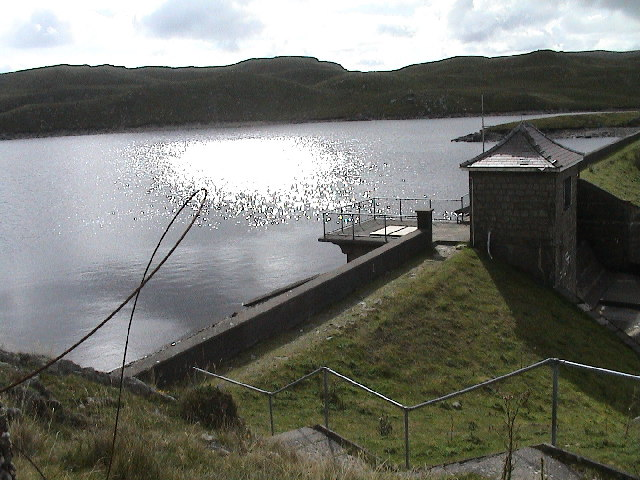
- Llyn Teifi, the source of the Teifi

- Course of the Teifi
- Native name: Afon Teifi (Welsh)

Location
- Country: Wales
- Counties: Ceredigion, Carmarthenshire, Pembrokeshire

Physical characteristics
- Source
  - location: Llyn Teifi
  - coordinates: 52.2918°N 3.7900°W
  - elevation: 455 m (1,493 ft)
- Mouth
  - location: Cardigan Bay
  - coordinates: 52.103°N 4.689°W
  - elevation: 0 m (0 ft)
- Length: 122 km (76 mi)
- Basin size: 1,008 km^{2} (389 sq mi)
- Discharge
  - location: Glan Teifi
  - average: 29.1 m^{3}/s (1,030 cu ft/s)
  - maximum: 373.6 m^{3}/s (13,190 cu ft/s)

Basin features
- Tributaries
  - left: Tyweli, Cych
  - right: Dulas, Clettwr, Ceri

The River Teifi (Welsh: Afon Teifi) is a river in Wales. It forms the boundary for most of its length between the Welsh counties of Ceredigion and Carmarthenshire, and for the final 3 miles (4.8 km) of its total length of 76 miles (122 km), the boundary between Ceredigion and Pembrokeshire. Its estuary is northwest of Cardigan, whose Welsh name is Aberteifi, meaning 'mouth of the Teifi'.

== Geography ==
The source of the River Teifi is the Llyn Teifi, the second-largest of the five Teifi lakes (Welsh: Llynnoedd Teifi) after Llyn Egnant located in Elenydd. It is situated towards the north of the county of Ceredigion in Elenydd at 1,493 feet (455 m). The river flows past Strata Florida Abbey and then through Pontrhydfendigaid before turning broadly southwest. Here it passes through Cors Caron, an extensive peat morass also known as Cors Goch Glanteifi (translated from Welsh as red bog on the banks of the Teifi). From here the river descends through pastures and bogs forming meanders on farmland below. Several small tributaries join from the valley with gorges, rocky and tree-lined sections also in the area.

Over the next 30 miles (48 km), the Teifi meanders southwest in a gentle arc passing through Tregaron, Llanddewi Brefi, Cwmann, Lampeter, Llanybydder, Llandysul, Newcastle Emlyn, and Cenarth. The river is tidal below Llechryd, descending through the steep-sided Cilgerran Gorge to Cardigan. West of Cardigan and St Dogmaels, the river broadens into a wide estuary with Poppit Sands on its west bank and Gwbert on its east bank as it enters Cardigan Bay.

On the lower parts of the river the wildlife at one time was reported as rich. There was a large variety ranging from water-crowfoot to Atlantic salmon as well as otters, wetland birds and multi fruited river moss. There have also been sightings of bottle-nosed dolphins where the river opens into the estuary.

It is sometimes asserted that the River Towy at 75 miles (121 km) and River Teifi at 76 miles (122 km) are the longest rivers wholly in Wales though at about 78 miles (126 km), the River Usk exceeds both.

The river is susceptible to flooding and there were some heavy floods in 2007 and 2008. If the swollen river is backed up by a high tide, flooding can occur in Cardigan and as far up river as Llechryd. A recent flooding was in December 2015.

The principal tributaries of the Teifi (ordered from source to sea) are as follows: Afon Mwyro, Nant Glasffrwd, Afon Meurig, Afon Fflur, Camddwr Fach, Camddwr, Brennig, Nant Carfan, Afon Brefi, Nant Digonest, Nant Clywedog, Ffrwd Cynon, Nant Gou, Nant Dulas, Nant Hathren, Nant Eiddig, Nant y Gwragedd, Nant Dolgwm, Afon Granell, Afon Duar, Nant Hust, Nant Ceiliog, Nant Caradog, Nant Cwm-du, Nant Cledlyn, Nant Fylchog, Afon Clettwr, Nant Wern-macwydd, Gwenffrwd, Afon Cerdin, Afon Tyweli, Nant Merwydd, Hoffnant, Afon Gwr-fach, Afon Siedi, Camnant, Nant Bachnog, Nant Iago, Nant Bargod, Afon Cynllo, Afon Cwm-wern, Nant Halen, Afon Arad, Nant Sarah, Afon Ceri, Afon Nawmor, Afon Hirwaun, Afon Cych, Afon Eifed, Nant Arberth, Afon Morgenau, Afon Plysgog, Nant Rhyd-y-fuwch, Afon Piliau, Afon Mwldan, Nant Degwen, Nant-y-ferwig.

== Geology and landscape ==
The Teifi and its tributaries are underlain by ancient Ordovician and Silurian mudstones which have been extensively glaciated during the ice ages. The resultant landform is one of rolling hills and valleys that support sheep and dairy farming.

The river enters a narrow gorge between Llechryd and Cilgerran, the sides of which are thickly wooded with a distinctive under-storey flora of wood rush.

== SSSI ==
Afon Teifi
- Site of Special Scientific Interest
- Location within Wales
- Location of Afon Teifi.
- Area of search: Ceredigion
- Grid reference: SN5153250832
- Interest: Biological and Geological
- Area: 772.6 ha (1,909 acres)
- Notification date: 1997

The Teifi has been designated as a Site of Special Scientific Interest (SSSI) since December 1997 in an attempt to protect the rare and unique features and species within it. This SSSI has been notified as being of both geological and biological importance. It is protected by law. The site has an area of 772.6 hectares and is managed by Natural Resources Wales.

== Hydrology ==
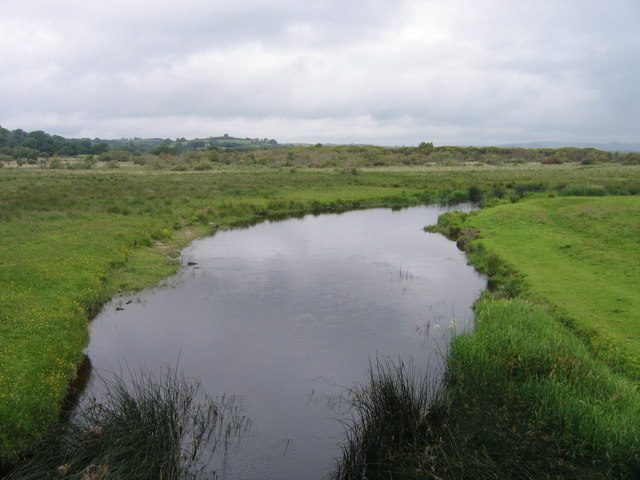
River at Cors Caron

The catchment of the river is estimated to be 1,008 square kilometres (389 mi^{2}) yielding an average flow at Glan Teifi, just upstream of Llechryd Bridge, of 29.126 m³/s. The maximum recorded flow between 1959 and 2011 was 373.6 m³/s on 18 October 1987. The average annual rainfall varies from 1,552 millimetres (61.1 in) in the upper catchment to 1,176 millimetres (46.3 in) in the lower catchment, which is higher than the average for United Kingdom at 1,101 millimetres (43.3 in).

== Culture and history ==
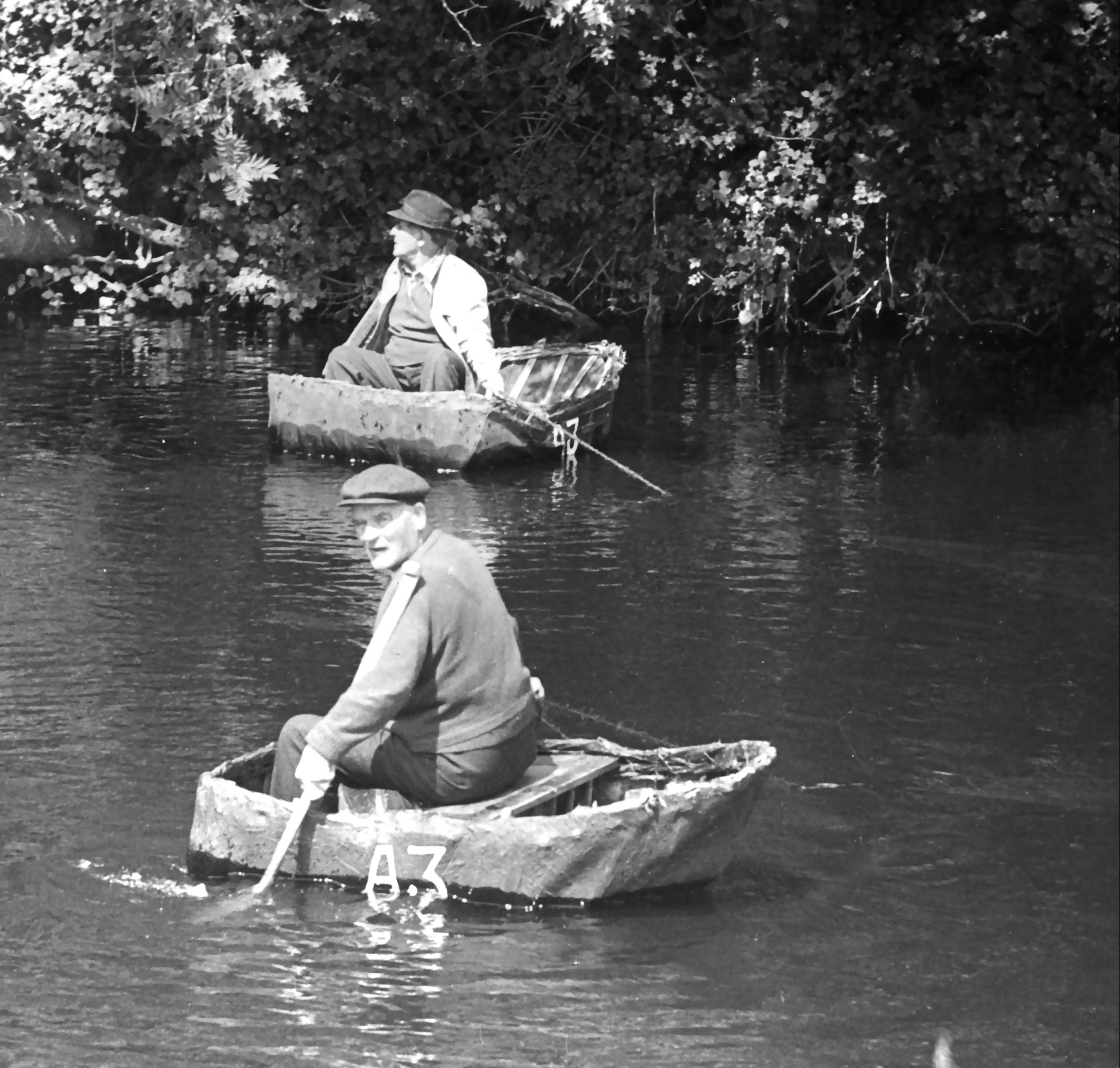
Coracles on the River Teifi (1972)

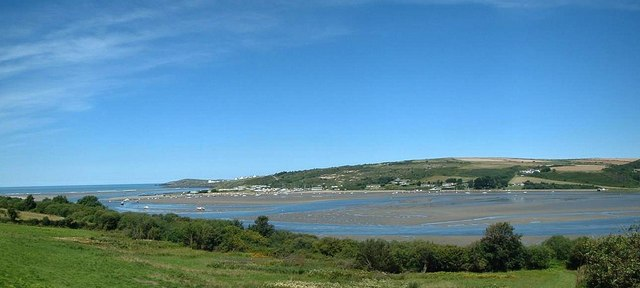
Teifi estuary between Poppit Sands and Gwbert

The Teifi valley has been inhabited since pre-history. There are many remains of Iron Age and Stone Age man including cromlechs (burial chambers) and standing stones.

Gerald of Wales wrote that the River Teifi was the only river that beavers inhabited in Wales in his time and it exceeded all other rivers in the abundance and delicacy of its salmon.

Between Cenarth and Cardigan, there is an ancient tradition of fishing and travel using coracles – very simple light-weight boats made of bent sticks covered with waterproofed hide or skins. These are paddled by a single oar used at the front of the craft which requires great skill. The principal use for coracles is for salmon fishing using nets. Today there are very few licences issued for coracle fishermen.

The remains of a medieval abbey stand at Strata Florida with examples of encaustic tiles on the floors. The river flows near to the Lampeter campus of the University of Wales Trinity Saint David, its predecessor, the University of Wales, Lampeter (est. 1822) having been the oldest university established in Wales. The river forms the southern boundary of the hamlet of Pen-y-wenallt.

In modern times, the source of the river, Llyn Teifi, is used as a reservoir for public water supply. The River Teifi is the complete water source for the local area of Mid & South Ceredigion. A former anglicisation "River Tivy" had also been used as a name of the river.

Concern over the health of the river has been reported, which include the levels of phosphates, nitrates, and sewage pollution. Following an analysis of data collected by environmental agencies, it has been stated the River Teifi has the most sewage discharges in Wales. A 2023 report of this analysis concluded the River Teifi was the ninth most polluted river in the UK. Further concern was reported in March 2023 after 10 tonnes of debris and agricultural waste was pulled from a 3 kilometres (1.9 mi) stretch of the river in Llandysul.

== See also ==
- Cardigan Castle
- Cenarth Falls
- Cilgerran Castle
- Coedmor National Nature Reserve
- Teifi Valley Railway
