= Efailnewydd =

Coordinates: 52°53′45″N 4°27′07″W

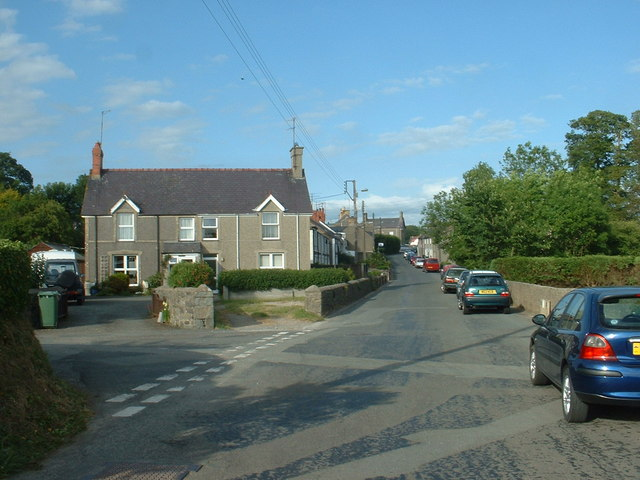
- Efailnewydd village

- Location within Gwynedd
- Population: 1,275 (ward 2011)
- OS grid reference: SH350359
- Community: Llannor
- Principal area: Gwynedd
- Preserved county: Gwynedd
- Country: Wales
- Sovereign state: United Kingdom
- Post town: PWLLHELI
- Postcode district: LL53
- Dialling code: 01758
- Police: North Wales
- Fire: North Wales
- Ambulance: Welsh
- UK Parliament: Dwyfor Meirionnydd
- Senedd Cymru – Welsh Parliament: Dwyfor Meirionnydd

Efailnewydd is a village on the Llŷn Peninsula (Welsh: Penrhyn Llŷn) in the Welsh county of Gwynedd. It lies 1.2 miles (2 km) north west of the market town of Pwllheli. The village forms part of the community of Llannor along with the villages of Y Ffor, Abererch and Rhos-fawr. The wards population was 1,275. and includes the community of Buan.

Pwllheli Rugby Club's playing field and clubhouse are located in the village. There was a small shop located at the centre of the village until 2024.
