= Vale of Ffestiniog =

Valley in Gwynedd, Wales

Coordinates: 52.944°N 4.006°W

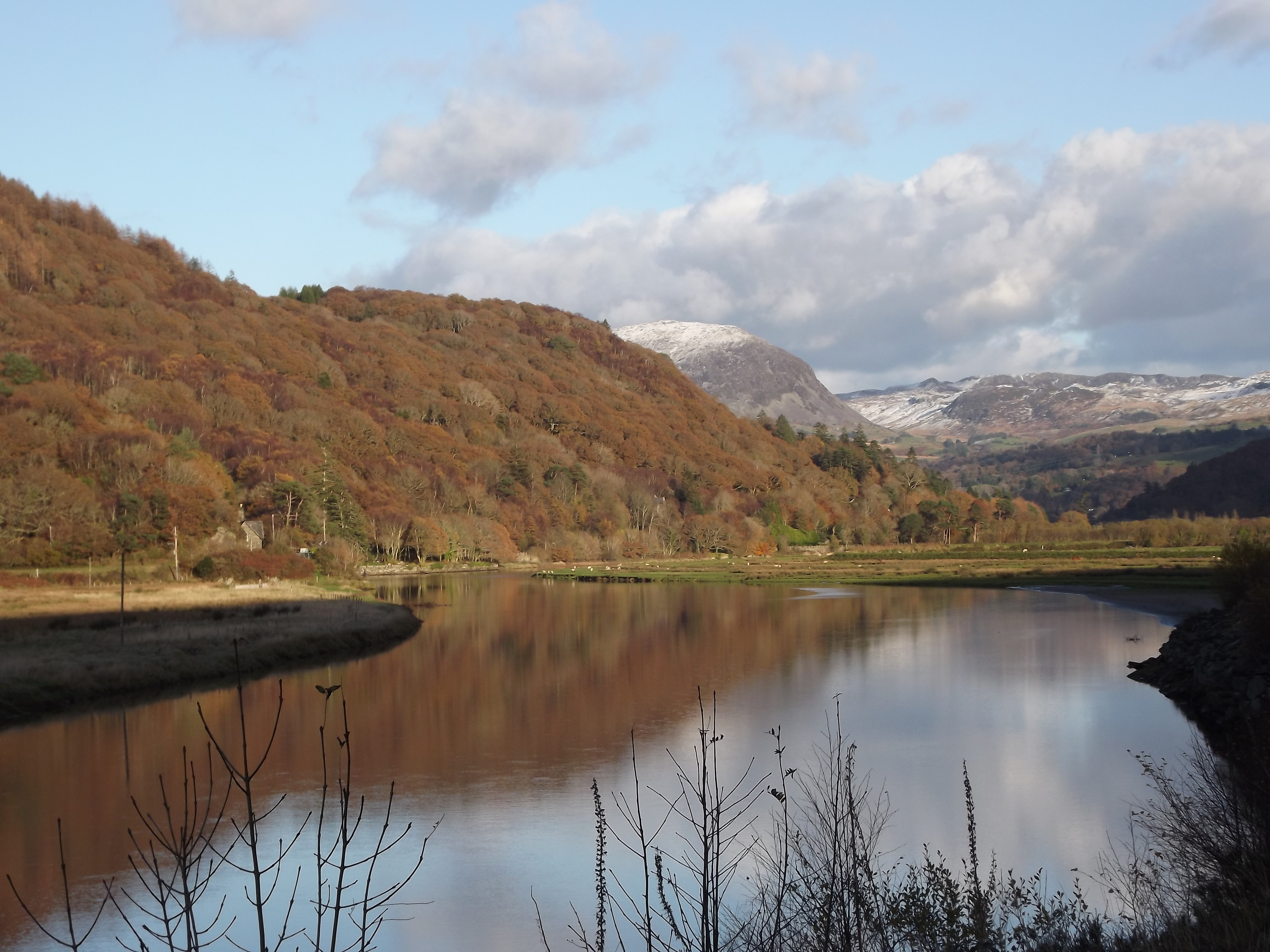
The Vale of Ffestiniog between Maentwrog and Penrhyndeudraeth

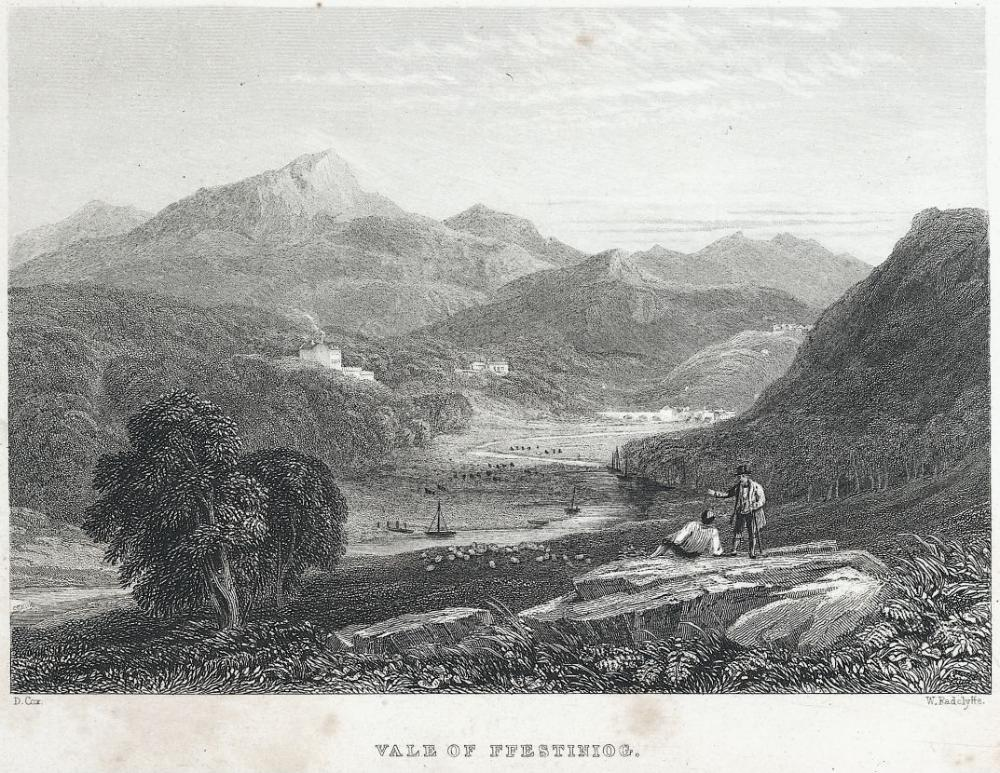
1844 etching of the Vale of Ffestiniog

The Vale of Ffestiniog is a valley in the Snowdonia National Park in Gwynedd, North Wales. It stretches from Ffestiniog in the east and runs in a westerly direction towards Tremadog Bay, terminating near Porthmadog. The Afon Dwyryd runs through the Vale; pastoral farming is practised along its length.

The Vale is chiefly famous for the Ffestiniog Railway, a narrow gauge railway running from Porthmadog to Blaenau Ffestiniog. Once used for transporting slate mined in Blaenau to docks on the coast, the line is now a major tourist attraction.
