= Cors Geirch National Nature Reserve =

Wetland site in Wales

Coordinates: 52.902°N 4.532°W

Cors Geirch National Nature Reserve is an extensive wetland site on the Llŷn Peninsula, in the central part of the valley that runs between Nefyn and Pwllheli in Wales. It is maintained by Natural Resources Wales.

In spring, the woodland on the slopes above the bog is transformed by a spectacular cover of primroses, wood anemone and bluebells. The variety of insects found here includes the rare marsh fritillary butterfly and many kinds of dragonfly and damselfly. It is drained by the Afon Rhyd-hir which flows to the sea at Pwllheli.
