= Endaf Emlyn =

Welsh musician and film and television director

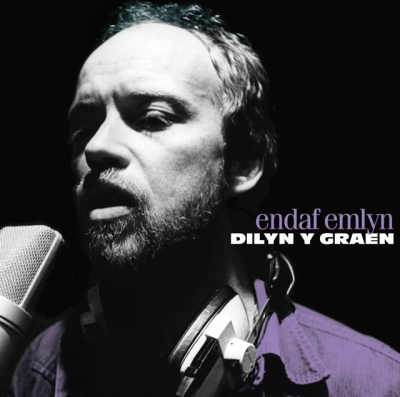
- Emlyn on the cover of his 2003 album Dilyn Y Graen
- Born: 31 July 1944 (age 82); Bangor, Caernarfonshire, Wales
- Known for: Shampŵ, Gaucho
- Awards: Full list

Endaf Emlyn (born 31 July 1944) is a Welsh musician and film and television director.

== Early life ==
Emlyn was born in Bangor, Caernarfonshire, Wales. He was brought up in Pwllheli and played violin in the National Youth Orchestra of Wales alongside Karl Jenkins and John Cale.

== Career ==
Emlyn trained initially as a teacher but shortly afterwards decided to pursue a career in the media instead. Upon the founding of Harlech Television in May 1968, he became one of the franchise's first four announcers as host of the quiz show Up to Date. He also worked as a script-writer, but had a simultaneous career as a musician.

=== Music ===
Emlyn has been producing music since the early 1960s. He is signed to Tony Hatch's publishing company, M&M Music. In 1971, he released his first single "Paper Chains / Madryn" on the Parlophone label. Recorded at EMI Studios, the A-side was named Record of the Week upon release by Tony Blackburn on BBC Radio 1. Two further singles for Parlophone followed: "Goodbye "Cherry Lill" / All Of My Life" (1972) and "Starshine / Where Were You?" (1973).

His first album, Hiraeth (1972), which combined interpretations of old folk tunes and original lyrical songs, was released in 1973. It was his only release on Carmarthenshire-based Welsh-language label Recordiau'r Dryw. Emlyn's second album, his first for Sain, was Salem (1974). Described as the first Welsh-language concept album, it contains songs inspired by Salem, the 1908 painting by the English painter Sydney Curnow Vosper depicting a scene inside Capel Salem, a Baptist Chapel in Pentre Gwynfryn, Gwynedd, Wales. The album was recorded in Emlyn's kitchen on four-track tape. His third album Syrffio Mewn Cariad (1976) was another concept album with songs about the sea while his fourth album Dawnsionara (1981) debuted "a sophisticated funk rock sound" and features Pino Palladino.

The first group he was a member of was Yr Eiddoch Yn Gywir (Yours Sincerely) with Hywel Gwynfryn and Derek Boote. He went on to become a member of the band Injaroc in 1977, and later a short-lived supergroup called Jîp, which included some former members of 'Brân'.

In 1974 he composed the opening music of the BBC's Welsh-language soap opera, Pobol y Cwm, and the theme has since been used in various forms.

=== TV and Film ===
He began his television career as a scriptwriter and publisher with HTV, and then a presenter on some of the first Welsh language pop programmes, as well as working behind the scenes as a floor manager. In the late 1970s he was producer of the HTV Wales music program Sgrech.

In 1983 he began to make his name as a director, releasing the documentary Shampŵ, which won the Celtic Film and Television Festival Spirit of the Festival award.

His film Gaucho was released in 1984, which brought attention and praise to his directorial work. He established a film and television company in the 1990s, also named Gaucho, in reference to his earlier release.

In May 2017 he was awarded the John Hefin Lifetime Contribution Award at the Carmarthen Bay Film Festival.

== Recordings ==
- Hiraeth ("Longing", 1974)
- Salem (1974)
- Syrffio Mewn Cariad ("Surfing In Love", 1976)
- Halen Y Ddaear (1977) ("Salt of the Earth", with the band Injaroc)
- Dawnsionara (1981)
- Barod Am Roc 1 ("Ready to Rock", 1984)
- Dilyn Y Graen (2003) ("Following the Grain", compilation)
- Deuwedd ("Twice", 2009)

== Filmography ==
- Gaucho (1983)
- Dyn Nath Ddwyn y Nadolig ("The Man Who Stole Christmas", 1985)
- Y Cloc ("The Clock", 1986)
- Stormydd Awst ("August Storms", 1988)
- Un Nos Ola Leuad ("One Moonlight Night", 1991)
- Gadael Lenin ("Leaving Lenin", 1992)
- Y Mapiwr ("The Mapper", 1995)
- Tair Chwaer ("Three Sisters", 1997-1999)
- The Company of Strangers (1999)

== Awards ==
Year	Award	Category	Work	Result
1983	Celtic Media Festival	Spirit of the Festival award	Shampŵ	Won
2017	Carmarthen Bay Film Festival	John Hefin Lifetime Contribution Award	—N/a	Won
