= Ryan and Ronnie =

Welsh TV comedy series (1971–1973)

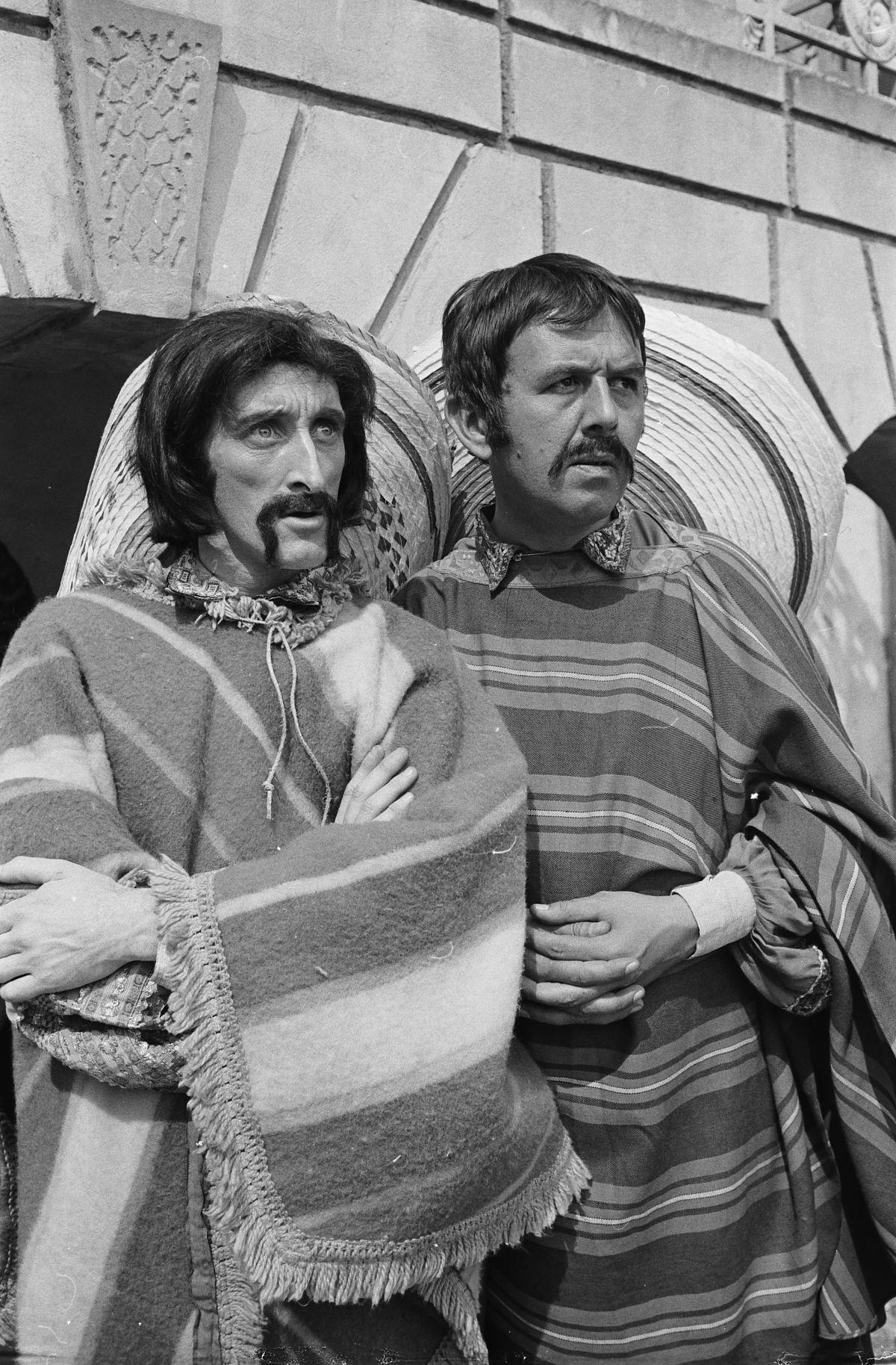
- Ryan (left) and Ronnie filming at Portmeirion in 1971
- Genre: Sketch comedy Surreal comedy Variety
- Starring: Ryan Davies; Ronnie Williams
- Country of origin: United Kingdom
- No. of series: 3

Production
- Production company: BBC Wales

Original release
- Network: BBC
- Release: 1971 – 1973

Ryan and Ronnie is a television comedy series, starring Ryan Davies and Ronnie Williams, made by BBC Wales and originally broadcast in the Welsh language under the title Ryan a Ronnie.

== Origins and format ==
The programme began with three Welsh-language series before the English version appeared in 1971. This then ran for three series, ending in 1973.

The programme consisted of sketches and stand-up comedy sessions in which Ronnie took the role of "straight man" to Ryan's clowning. There was also music, from the duo themselves and regular guests such as Welsh singer Margaret Williams. Each programme ended with an episode of a spoof soap opera entitled "Our House", in which Ryan played the mother of the family and Ronnie the father. Myfanwy Talog played their daughter, "Phyllis Doris".

The running joke in "Our House" was that "Mam" doted on her son, Nigel Wyn (originally played by Derek Boote and later by resident singer Bryn Williams), and forgave him anything, whilst being strict with Phyllis Doris, whom she always addressed as "you brazen hussy". Both children were played by adults, the former appearing dressed in school uniform. The father, "Will", was the silent type, but each week, Nigel Wyn would address him as "Will" and "Will" would say, "Don't call Will on your father". (The phrase "call on" is a direct translation from the Welsh "Paid a galw Wil ar dy dad!"). With its almost surreal humour, "Our House" has achieved an iconic status. On one occasion, the show's guest star Ken Dodd also appeared as a character in "Our House".

== Legacy ==
An S4C film about Ryan and Ronnie won several BAFTA Cymru awards in May 2010.

Recurring characters Blodwen and Mary had their own song, in both English and Welsh versions. An English version was released as a single in 1975.
