= Salem (painting) =

Painting by Sydney Curnow Vosper

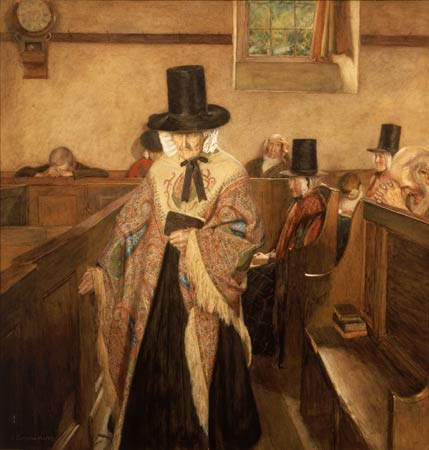
- Artist: Sydney Curnow Vosper
- Year: 1908
- Type: Watercolour on paper
- Dimensions: 71.1 cm × 69.8 cm (28.0 in × 27.5 in)
- Location: Lady Lever Art Gallery, Port Sunlight, Wirral

Salem is a painting created by the English artist Sydney Curnow Vosper in 1908. It depicts a scene within Capel Salem, a Baptist chapel in Pentre Gwynfryn, Gwynedd, Wales. It is noteworthy as a depiction of Welsh piety, the traditional Welsh national costume, and for a contentious belief that the devil is depicted within it.

Mass reproductions in the early and mid 20th century allowed the image to become widespread throughout the United Kingdom. It has been described as an iconic symbol of Wales, as The Hay Wain by John Constable is described as a symbol of England.

== History ==
Vosper had found success as a watercolour painter before coming to Wales; he had exhibited work in galleries throughout England, at the Paris Salon and the Royal Academy in London. He was noted for his paintings of people, particularly the residents of Le Faouët in Brittany. Vosper's Welsh period began with his marriage to Constance James of Merthyr Tydfil in 1902, and ended after her death in 1910.

Vosper first saw Capel Salem in 1906, not long after the "Welsh Revival". He had already painted many famous images of prayer and piety in Brittany, and it would seem the chapel and its congregation inspired him in much the same way.

== Composition ==
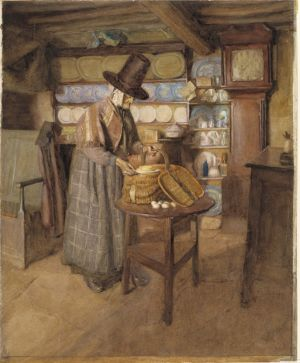
Market Day in Old Wales (1910), a later painting by Vosper also featuring Siân Owen

The main figure is Siân Owen (born at Maesygarnedd farm in 1837). At the time of painting she was 71 and lived in Tŷ'n y Fawnog on the backroads from Llanbedr. Why Vosper chose Siân (who was not a member of the chapel) to be the main focus of the painting is unclear. There was a contemporary cultural image in Wales of a strong maternal figure (Mam Cymru) which was considered iconic to Welsh family life. For Vosper, Siân's own life and background would have reflected this image. Having lost her husband George in the 1880s, Siân lived as a widow, her son William had two sons himself, who Siân raised in her tiny cottage. Both grandsons would be tragically killed in the First World War, but Siân would live on until 1927, and is buried in Llanfair churchyard, Harlech.

Siân Owen would have had to stand for days wearing the shawl so that Vosper could paint its intricate detail and folds. Vosper later complained that she twitched and moved so much that it became impossible for him to accurately reproduce the shawl's pattern and colour. Eventually Vosper decided to paint the final stages without Siân, pinning the shawl to a borrowed tailor's dummy instead. Despite this Vosper would again ask Siân Owen to model for another of his paintings, Market Day in Old Wales (1910).

Of the other figures depicted, only one was a member of the chapel. Robert Williams of Caer Meddyg (a carpenter, farmer and deacon at Capel Salem), can be seen on the far left seated beneath the clock. Next to him, and slightly obscured is Laura Williams of Tŷ'n-y-Buarth, Llanfair. Left of her, with his back against the wall is Owen Jones (commonly called Owen Siôn) of Carleg Coch. The small boy is Evan Edward Lloyd and by his side is Mary Rowland. On the extreme right with his head bowed, is William Jones (William Siôn), brother of Owen. Vosper paid each model 6d. (2.5p) an hour for sitting.

The eighth figure (second right of Siân Owen, wearing a Welsh hat) is not actually a model, but the tailor's dummy which Vosper had borrowed and named "Leusa Jones". The chapel elders were uncomfortable with a dummy being in a sacred place of worship, and insisted that it was removed each Saturday night before the "seiat" (weekly church meeting) the following morning.

The Welsh hat was a fashion that had been current in the 1830s and 1840s. By the time of painting the hats were no longer worn by women in Wales, and the wearing of hats inside a chapel would have been considered a great faux pas, especially for women. Vosper, however, wanted the women to wear the traditional tall stove pipe hats that many believed were a permanent feature of rural Welsh life. In fact, Vosper could only find one remaining hat in the area and had to share the item amongst the models, painting the same hat into the composition four times. Siân Owen's ostentatious shawl was likewise an uncommon item and had to be borrowed from the wife of the vicar of Harlech.

== Mass appeal ==
Vosper exhibited Salem in 1909 at the Royal Academy in London, where it came to the attention of the industrialist William Hesketh Lever. Lever bought the painting for £105 and the original can be seen today in the art gallery he established at Port Sunlight. The painting may have remained obscure in his private collection had Lever not decided to use the painting in a promotion of the Lever Brothers' popular product Sunlight soap.

The soap bars came with collectable tokens, and buying seven pounds of soap would acquire enough tokens to exchange for a print of the painting (an early example of marketing premiums). This promotion resulted in Salem appearing in many homes across Britain. At that time many homes owned no form of visual art and the innovative 'free gift' offer ensured that prints of Salem became widely, and uniquely popular amongst working-class communities, especially in Wales.

By 1933 the painting was famous enough to be the subject of a notable article in the Welsh-language magazine Y Ford Gron ('The Round Table') and in 1937, Salem gained yet more popularity when Sir Ifan ab Owen Edwards sold thousands of prints to supporters of Urdd Gobaith Cymru for 6d. By 1942 it was described by Yr Aelwyd ('The Hearth') as "One of the most beautiful pictures of the religious life of Wales in old times", and in 1950, 1956 and 1957 many more Welsh households obtained copies when the picture was used in the Cymru Fydd calendar. By the 1960s, the painting was famous throughout Wales and was ubiquitous in many Welsh communities.

Today a framed print of Salem hanging on the wall is a feature of many Welsh museums and historical buildings. In 2013, the painting featured in the first episode of the Welsh drama series Hinterland.

== Hidden figures and interpretations ==
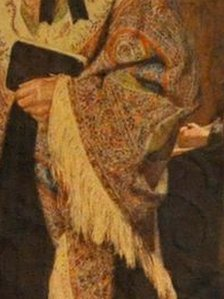
Detail of the shawl

As reproductions became popular, so did the notion that the composition contained a hidden figure. Discussions of the painting's intended meaning often used this notion to support their interpretations.

Aside from pious interpretations, there was much speculation that the painting had a more disapproving meaning. Some suggested that the painting was a comment on the sin of vanity. The chapel clock suggests that Siân Owen is arriving belatedly at a few minutes before ten (during the traditional Welsh silence before the morning service), possibly to ensure that her presence is noted, and appears to be wearing comparatively ostentatious clothing. The interpretation was often synonymous with a popular belief that Vosper had hidden an image of the devil in the folds of Siân Owen's shawl. The postulated image can be seen in the section of shawl around her left arm. The paisley pattern forms a horn, the folds his eye and nose and the shawl's trim his beard.

When questioned on this, Vosper always denied any such detail had been intentionally painted into the shawl. The enigmatic painter did confirm, however, an intended ghostly face painted into the verdant window scene. The partial knowledge of a hidden face somewhere within the painting is a likely starting point for the popular theory of a devil within the shawl.

The painting's varying interpretations (especially as an admonishing lesson on pride) are now considered a valuable example of how the Welsh viewed themselves, and their rural nonconformist past, in the twentieth century. The devil in the shawl is now most commonly considered an example of pareidolia.

== Exhibition ==
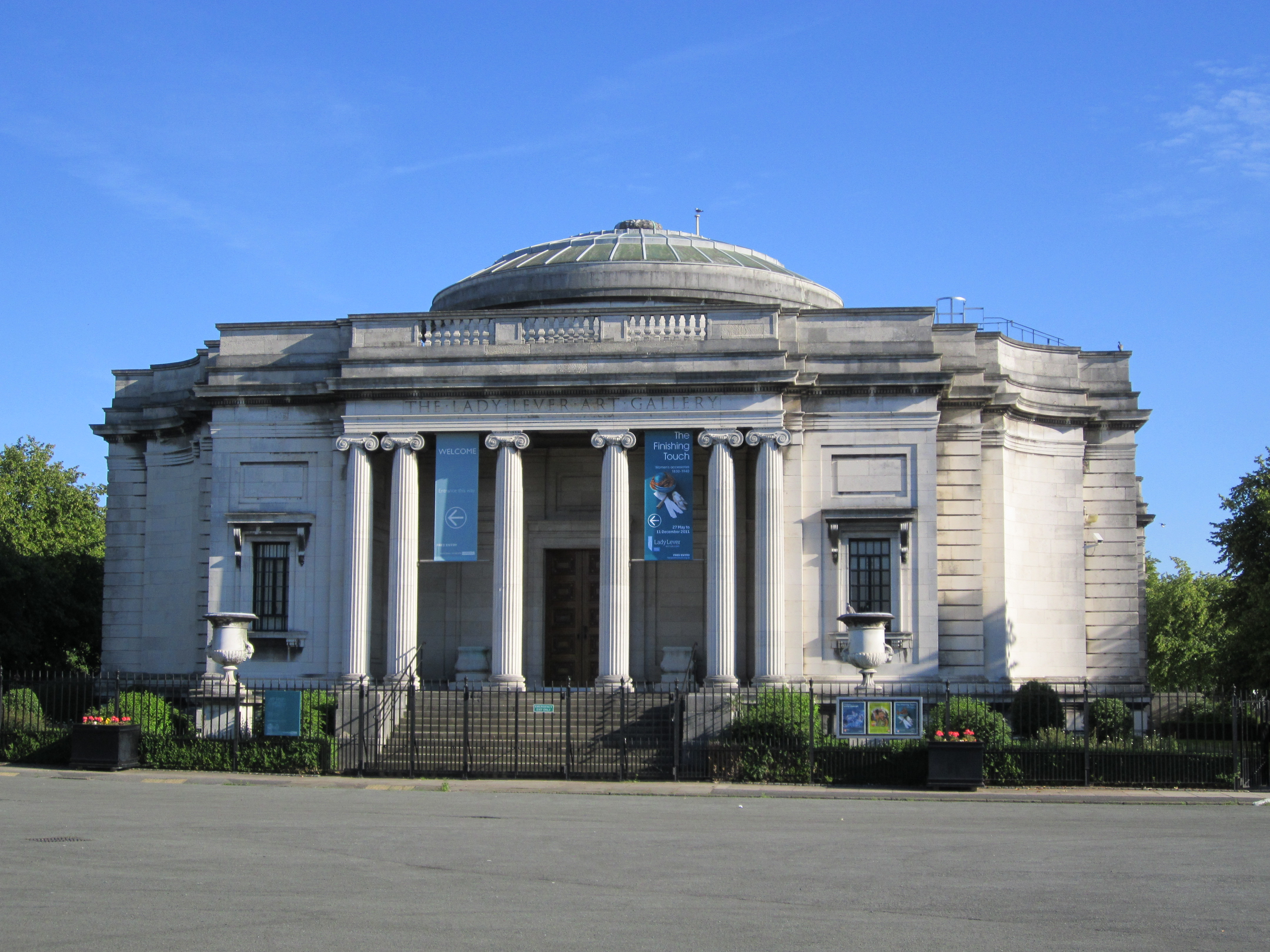
The Lady Lever Art Gallery in Port Sunlight

The painting is on display at the Lady Lever Art Gallery at Port Sunlight, though there have been several attempts to permanently house it within Wales, most notably by a campaign in 2005 headed by Plaid Cymru's culture spokesman Owen John Thomas. In 2013 it formed the centrepiece of a temporary exhibition at the Gwynedd Museum and Art Gallery in Bangor.

Many Welsh museums and galleries hold and exhibit paintings by Vosper from the same period. Most notably, National Museum Cardiff houses Market Day in Old Wales (1908), a later painting featuring Siân Owen. Often considered a sister work, the painting was gifted to the museum by Constance Vosper's brother, Frank Treharne James, in 1914. Speaking in 2005 on the possibility of acquiring Salem, the Museum's director said that "It was commissioned by the Lever family therefore belongs in the gallery they created, now belonging to the National Museums Liverpool".

== James Version ==
Hel Straeon a 1988 S4C arts programme revealed the existence of a slightly different version of Salem, owned by a descendant of Frank Treharne James. Vosper produced this second slightly different version in 1909, a year after painting the first version. Peter Lord, an authority on Welsh painting, verified this second work as a Vosper composition. This painting was at one point on display at Cyfarthfa Castle in Merthyr Tydfil, along with many other Vosper works bequeathed to the town upon the death of his second son.

On 10 October 2019, the National Library of Wales (Llyfrgell Genedlaethol Cymru) announced that it had purchased the James version of the Salem painting on behalf of the nation, "to protect and cherish it forever".

== See also ==
- Culture of Wales
- Cythraul
- Welsh art
