= Ryan Davies =

Welsh comedian, actor and musician (1937–1977)

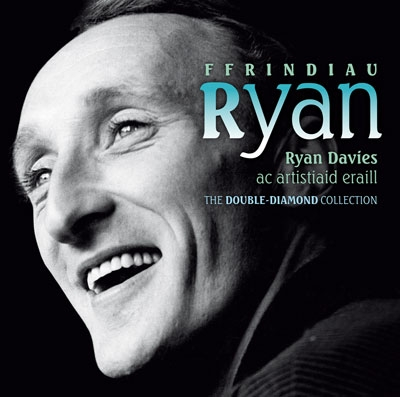
- Posthumous tribute album Ffrindiau Ryan
- Born: 22 January 1937; Glanamman, Wales
- Died: 22 April 1977 (aged 40); Buffalo, New York, U.S.
- Education: Royal Central School of Speech and Drama
- Occupations: Comedian; actor; musician; singer; songwriter
- Years active: 1966–1977
- Spouse: Irene
- Children: 2, including Arwyn

Ryan Davies (22 January 1937 – 22 April 1977) was a Welsh comedian, actor, musician, singer, and songwriter. Though his career lasted just 11 years, he became widely known in Wales through his work with Ronnie Williams as the comedic double act Ryan and Ronnie.

== Early life ==
Davies was born in Glanamman on 22 January 1937. He attended Llanfyllin County School and then Llanfyllin High School when his parents were appointed Master and Matron of Y Dolydd Llanfyllin. He was educated in Bangor and at London's Central School of Speech and Drama.

== Career ==
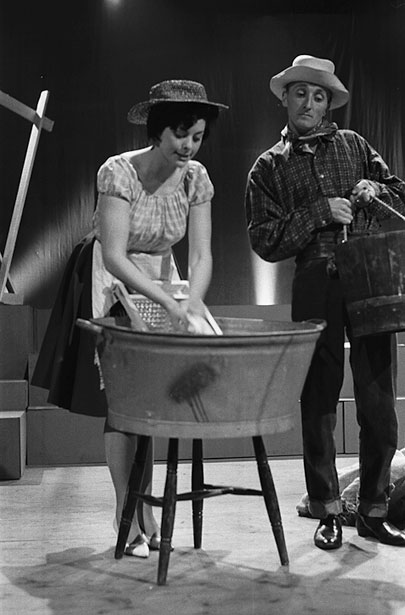
Davies performing with Margaret Williams in 1967

Davies' first professional appearance was in the National Eisteddfod of Wales in Aberavon in 1966. His talents were quickly recognised by BBC Wales, and he made his name on Welsh-language television shows such as the sitcom Fo a Fe. Meredydd Edwards, the head of Light Entertainment, brought Davies and Ronnie Williams together as a double act and the pair had immediate success, first in their Welsh-language television show Ryan a Ronnie. This also launched them onto the concert and cabaret circuit across Wales.

The duo's show became so popular that it was moved to BBC1 and broadcast in English, winning them a much wider audience, and three series were shown between 1971 and 1973. Davies' speciality was dressing up as a "typical" Welsh housewife for a weekly sketch on the show known as "Our House", in which he played "Mam" and Williams played Will, the father. The two were hugely popular in Wales, and were the first comedians to make TV series in both Welsh and English. They were often thought of fondly as the Welsh answer to Morecambe and Wise.

Davies had a simultaneous solo career as an actor, singer, pianist, and songwriter. He had a role in the 1971 film Under Milk Wood. His best known compositions are "Hen Geiliog y Gwynt", "Nadolig Pwy a Wyr", and "Blodwen a Meri".

Other songs written by Davies and performed with Williams in their television series have been covered by other artists, including "Ti a dy ddoniau" being covered by Jodie Marie and "Yn y bore" being covered by Emyr Wyn Gibson and Steve Pablo Jones.

Davies and Williams split in 1975, citing Williams' ill health as the official reason, though Williams would ultimately outlive Davies by 20 years.

Following Williams' decision to stop performing, Davies pursued a solo career, with a live show at the Swansea Top Rank nightclub. The evening saw Davies give a notable performance of Myfanwy, a song he described as "The greatest love song ever written". The live recording of this version was included on Davies' album Ryan at the Rank, with the song quickly became one of Davies' most notable and familiar performances. The album itself is now regarded as a classic.

Davies continued to appear extensively on television and in traditional Christmas pantomime appearances in at the Swansea Grand Theatre.

== Personal life ==
Ryan married his childhood sweetheart Irene; they had a daughter named Bethan and a son named Arwyn, the latter of whom also became an actor.

== Death ==
On 22 April 1977, Davies died suddenly of an asthma attack while visiting American friends in Buffalo, New York. He was 40 years old. One of his own songs, "Pan Fo'r Nos yn Hir", was performed at his funeral. It has since been covered by other performers, including Rhydian Roberts and the Whitland Male Voice Choir.

== Filmography ==
- Under Milk Wood (1971) – Second Man
