= Ronnie Williams (comedian) =

Welsh actor and comedian (1939–1997)

- Born: Ronald Clive Williams; 29 March 1939; Cefneithin, Wales
- Died: 28 December 1997 (aged 58); Cardigan, Ceredigion, Wales
- Occupations: Actor; comedian

Ronald Clive Williams (29 March 1939 – 28 December 1997) was a Welsh actor and comedian, who remains best known for his association with Ryan Davies during the 1970s.

Ronnie Williams began his career as an actor, but struggled for recognition, making an isolated television appearance in The Wednesday Play in 1966 as a newsreader, which by then he was; the episode, "Where the Buffalo Roam", was written by Dennis Potter and starred Hywel Bennett. He worked as a bus conductor before finding fame with his appearances on Welsh language television, working as a continuity announcer and newsreader for BBC Wales. In 1970, he created a double act with Ryan Davies; their comedy series, Ryan & Ronnie, was broadcast first on BBC Wales and later, in English, on BBC1.

Broadcaster Hywel Gwynfryn, in his 2014 biography of the two comedians, describes the contrast between their appearance and character, enhanced by the fact that Williams was a baritone who could hold his own in duets with Davies's tenor. For a while, Gwynfryn lodged with Williams and his wife Einir, who lived in Rhiwbina, Cardiff. One of the scriptwriters on Ryan and Ronnie, Meic Povey, later wrote a play about their career.

Although Davies was seen as the more talented member of the duo, Williams made a major contribution to the writing of the series. Having been forced to take a lesser role in view of Davies's versatility and popularity, Williams became an alcoholic. The break-up of the partnership in 1975 was attributed to Williams' ill health, but they remained friends and it was Davies who suddenly died in 1977. In the 1970s, Williams also owned the White Lion pub at Cerrigydrudion. He continued to appear on Welsh television and played Mr. Vissianni, a cafe owner, in the S4C series Tan Tro Nesa in 1985. He was also one of the stars of the film Twin Town (1997). He starred in Crime Pays (Mae'n Talu Weithe), a bilingual S4C film.

Williams suffered from severe depression. In the 1990s, he said of his work with Ryan Davies: "The more successful you are, the more strain there is. The idea that you’re only as good as your last show worried us all the time […] we were working too hard, and we knew we were". On 28 December 1997, he died by suicide in Cardigan, Ceredigion.
