= Derek Boote =

Welsh singer and actor

Derek Boote (13 December 1942, Anglesey East, Anglesey, Wales - 29 November 1974) was a Welsh singer and actor.

Boote came from Star, near Gaerwen on Anglesey. He was educated in Llangefni and at the Royal Welsh College of Music and Drama in Cardiff.

Boote played the guitar and double bass and sang with the Welsh broadcaster Hywel Gwynfryn; they later formed a group with singer Endaf Emlyn. Boote competed in the 1971 edition of Welsh singing competition Cân i Gymru.

Boote performed alongside Ryan and Ronnie, playing the original Nigel Wyn character on their sketch show. After his death, he was replaced by Bryn Williams. He also appeared in the Welsh-language television programme Dau a Hanner (Two and a Half).

Boote released an EP record Byw'n Rhydd on the Recordiau'r Dryw label.

Boote occasionally taught at Ysgol Gyfun Llanhari, and at six feet four inches (1.93 m) tall was a keen amateur rugby player.

On October 17, 1974, Boote was dressed up in a space monster costume for a children's scifi programme named Maldwyn Aldwyn and waiting to go on at BBC Studios. Screams were heard from his dressing room and he was found engulfed in flames. He was badly burned and rushed to hospital in critical condition. The explanation given by Gareth Price in his work Broadcasters of BBC Wales was that he had been smoking a cigarette during a break and the ash from his cigarette had dropped on his costume, which had ignited after a short time. He later died from his injuries in Chepstow hospital. The costume was supposed to have been fireproof, but the protection was ineffective.
