= Owen Morgan =

Welsh journalist and writer

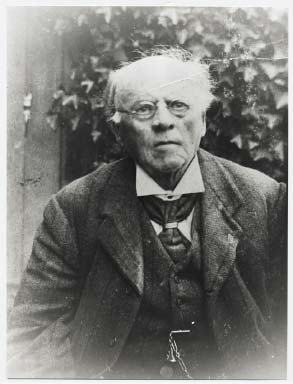
- Born: Owen Morgan; 1836; Rhondda, Wales
- Died: 16 December 1921 (aged 84–85)
- Occupations: journalist, author
- Writing career
- Genres: theology, history
- Subjects: druidism, mythology

Owen Morgan, also known by his bardic name Morien (1836 – 16 December 1921) was a Welsh journalist, and a writer of books on the subject of neo-druidism. Morgan developed the mythology of both Iolo Morganwg and Myfyr Morganwg, and his druidical writing is not taken seriously by historians.

== Life history ==
The exact date and place of Morgan's birth is unknown, as Morgan himself hid the details. Although the 1881 census states his year of birth as 1839, latter studies have placed it as 1836. Born to a Thomas T. Morgan, a coal miner, and his wife, Margaret, of Penygraig in the Rhondda, research in The Oxford Companion to the Literature of Wales states that an Owen Morgan was born to a Thomas Morgan and Margaret (née Owen) and christened in 1836. Although no explicit evidence is available, Morgan would later claim connection with the families of Morgan of Llantarnam and Thomas of Llanmihangel.

In 1870 Morgan took on a job as a writer on the Western Mail, and around the same period he began to write his own books after taking an interest in local history. He made his name as a journalistic writer when he covered the Tynewydd Colliery rescue in Porth in 1877. Morgan closely associated himself with Myfyr Morganwg (Evan Davies), a self-proclaimed archdruid and Welsh writer in neo-druidry, who himself was a student of Iolo Morganwg (Edward Williams) one of the most popular and imaginative developers of Welsh legends. In 1889 Morgan published Pabell Dafydd, a Welsh language book on druidism which he followed with Kimmerian Discoveries, covering Morgan's research and thinking on the alleged Chaldean origins of the Welsh people. In 1893 he wrote his magnum opus The Light of Britannia which again explored Druidism in Britain, but also included chapters on phallic worship, King Arthur and his twelve knights and Saint Paul's supposed journey to South Wales. In 1901 Morgan released, The Royal Winged Son of Stonehenge and Avebury a reprint of Kimmerian Discoveries under a different title. The Royal Winged Son was republished in 1984 under the title Mabin of the Mabinogion.

Other books written by Morgan include A Guide to the Gorsedd (n.d.) and a 1903 publication, A History of Pontypridd and the Rhondda Valleys, the latter was described by Welsh historian Robert Thomas Jenkins as "an odd jumble of Druidism, mythology, topography, local history and biography". Paul R. Davis in his 1989 publication Historic Rhondda, goes further, blaming the book for misleading future historians, giving one example concerning Ynysgrug, a motte and bailey castle once located in Tonypandy: Morgan not only misidentifies the height of the 30 ft. mound as 100 ft. but states that "...all these sacred mounds were reared in this country...when Druidism was the established religion", but gives no historic proof. A History of Pontypridd and the Rhondda Valleys also contained an illustration of Ynysgrug, to which the artist has added a moat and several druids, neither of which are factual. Despite Morgan's spurious research into Welsh history, this final book has become worthy of some note due to its account of 19th century life in the industrial valleys, the time from which he was writing.

Despite working for the Western Mail, some of Morgan's more outlandish behaviour or claims were often challenged in the newspaper, and he was several times the subject of the daily cartoon, drawn by J.M. Staniforth. Other's were not so quick to ignore or ridicule Morgan's work. Scottish folklore compiler and occultist writer Lewis Spence, dedicates a chapter to Morgan in his 1905 work The Mysteries of Britain, and though Spence does not disagree that Morgan's work, especially The Light of Britannia, is difficult to source, he also believed that his works are of "primary importance" in revealing "the faith and mythology underlining the British Secret Tradition [Druidism]".

== Bibliography ==
- Kimmerian Revalations. Pontypridd. n.d.
- Pabell Dafydd. Cardiff. 1889.
- The Light of Britannia. Cardiff. 1890.
- Guide to the Gorsedd or Round table and the Order of the Garter. Cardiff. 1890.
- The Royal Winged Son of Stonehenge and Avebury (reprint of Kimmerian Revalations ed.). Cardiff: Glarmorgan Free Press. 1900.
- A History of Pontypridd and the Rhondda Valleys. 1903.
- The Mabin of the Mabinogion (reprint of The Royal Winged Son of Stonehenge and Avebury ed.). Thorsons for the Research into Lost Knowledge. 1984.

== Gallery ==
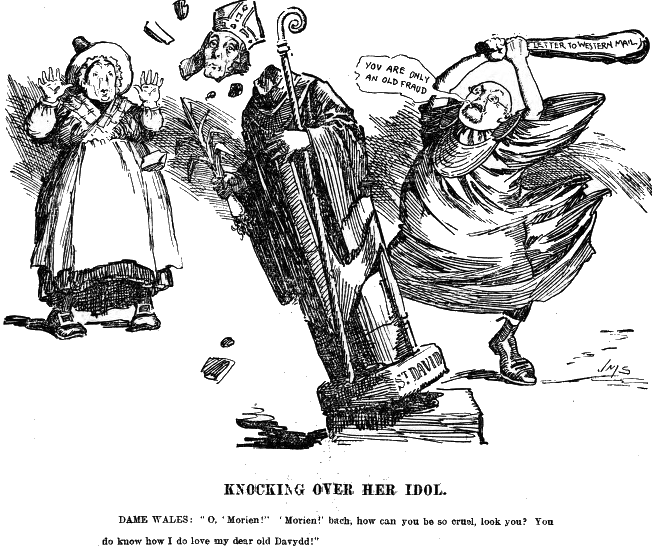
Newspaper cartoon by J. M. Staniforth, Morgan destroys an image of Saint David with a cudgel, Dame Wales looks on in dismay 1899. Date 6 January 1899

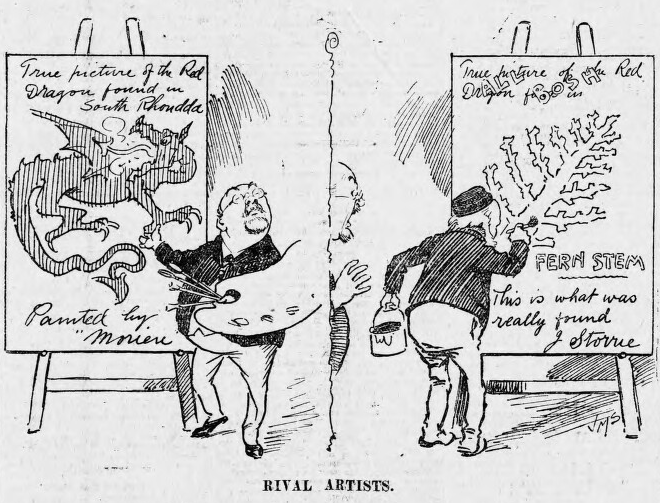
Morgan claims to have discovered a dragon in his native Rhondda Valley, but it is debunked by a rival, botanist Sir John Storrie.

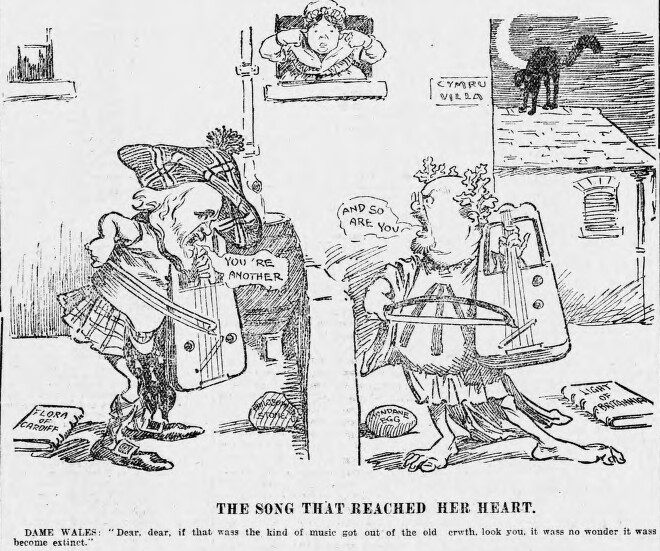
Dame Wales complains as botanist John Storrie and Morgan quarrel, both playing the crwth.
