= Capel Salem, Llanbedr =

Chapel near Llanbedr, Gwynedd, Wales

Coordinates: 52.8257°N 4.0750°W

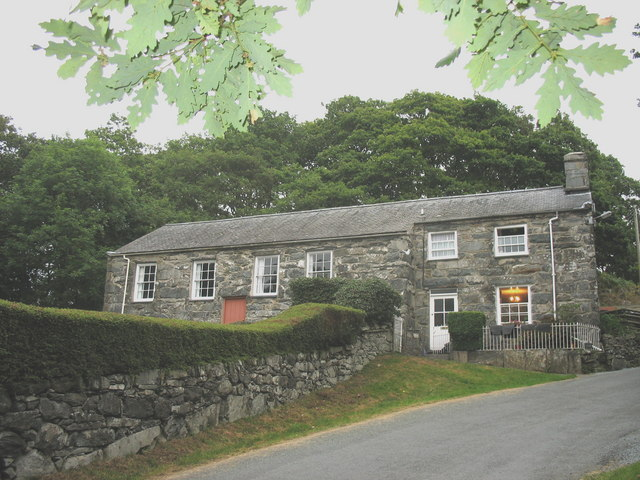
Capel Salem

Capel Salem is a Grade II listed building in the hamlet of Pentre Gwynfryn, near Llanbedr, Gwynedd, Wales. This Baptist chapel building is about a mile upriver of Llanbedr, on a ridge between the two valleys, 300 yards (270 m) upstream from where the two rivers meet. The building was begun in 1826 and completed in 1851, but ten years later it was extended to include the chapel house and to remodel the interior.

== Salem by Vosper ==
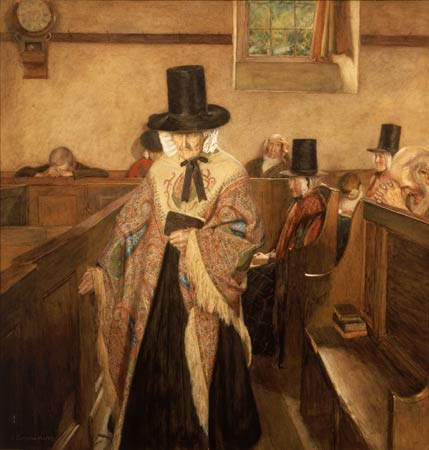
Salem (1908)

The Chapel is the subject of a 1908 painting by Sidney Curnow Vosper, (b. 29 October 1866). The painting was purchased by Lord Leverhulme in 1909, and became popular when he used it to promote Lever Brothers' Sunlight Soap, which offered to send purchasers a colour print. At a time when many homes owned no form of visual art, prints of Salem became widely and uniquely popular amongst working class communities, especially in Wales.

As the painting's popularity spread, so did the discussion and rumours around the notion that it contained a hidden figure, most notably that the devil was depicted in the central figure's shawl. The various interpretations of the painting, themselves became considered as examples of how people viewed rural nonconformist communities, and how the Welsh viewed themselves.

Vosper always denied he had painted any faces into the shawl. However, the painter did confirm that he painted a ghostly face in the window above the central figure. The partial knowledge (that somewhere within the painting is a hidden face) was probably the starting point for the belief that a devil was painted into the shawl. Today, the painting and its hidden faces are often cited as an example of pareidolia. The original picture now hangs in the Lady Lever Art Gallery, Port Sunlight.
