= Welsh hat =

Traditional Welsh headwear

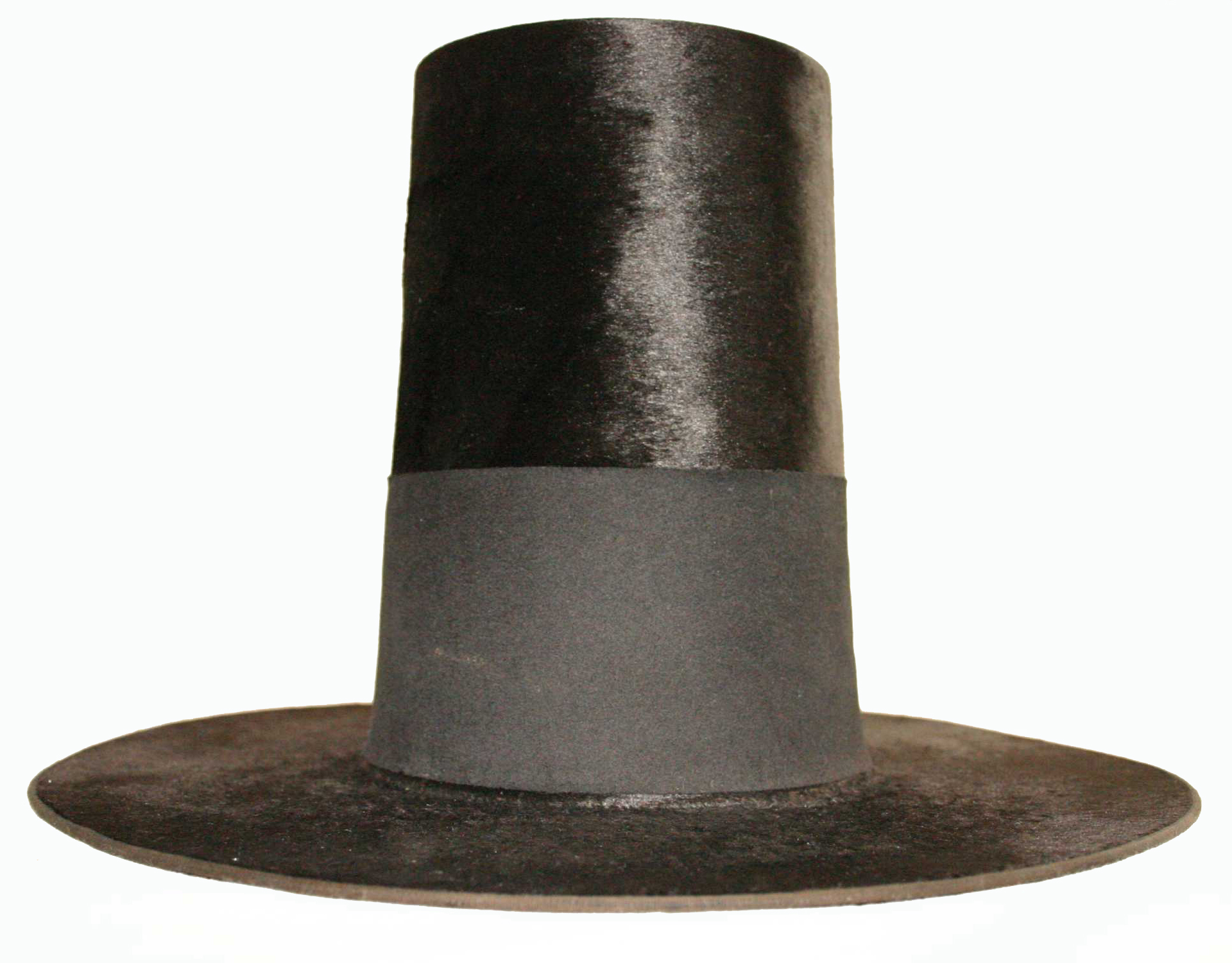

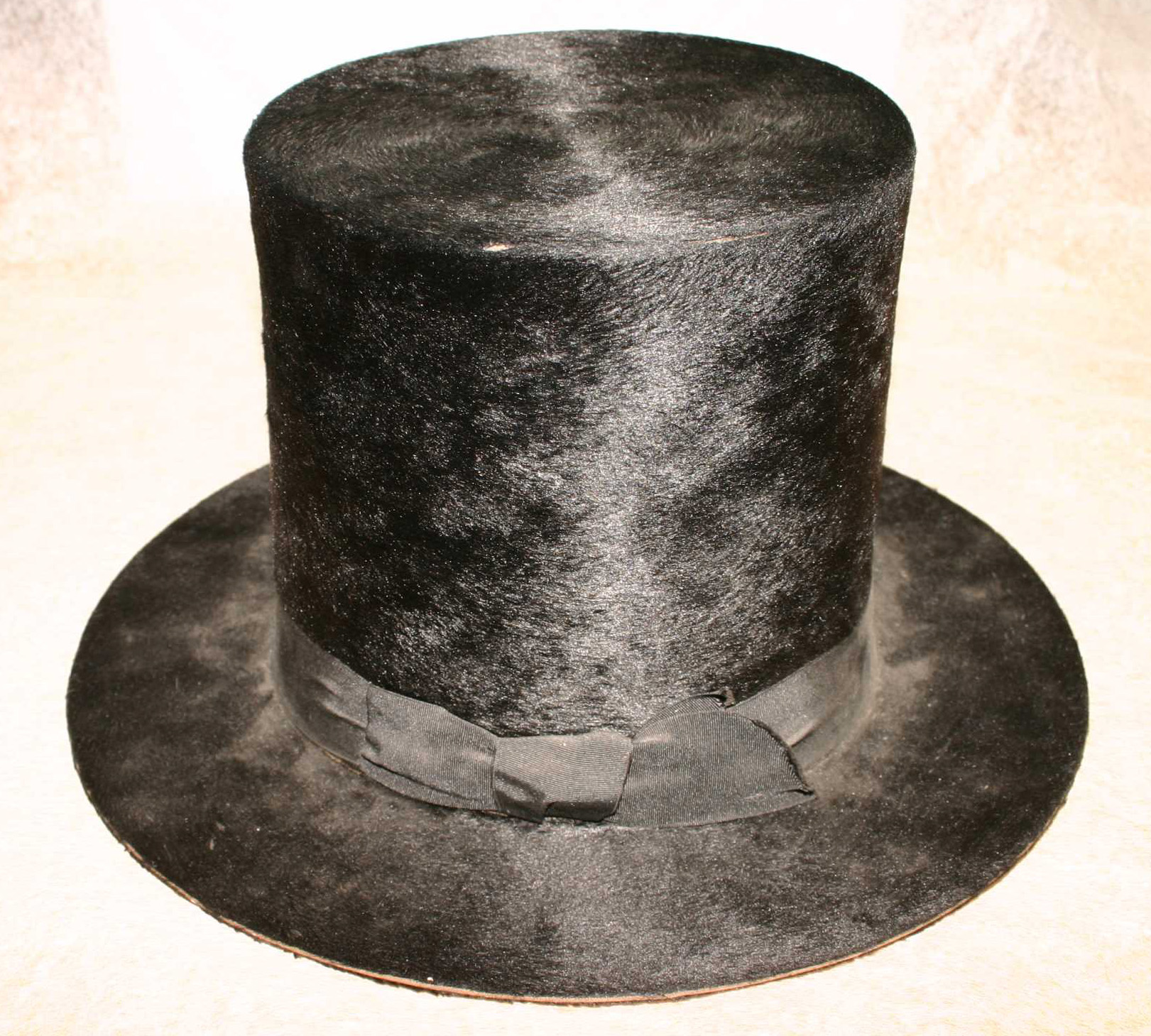

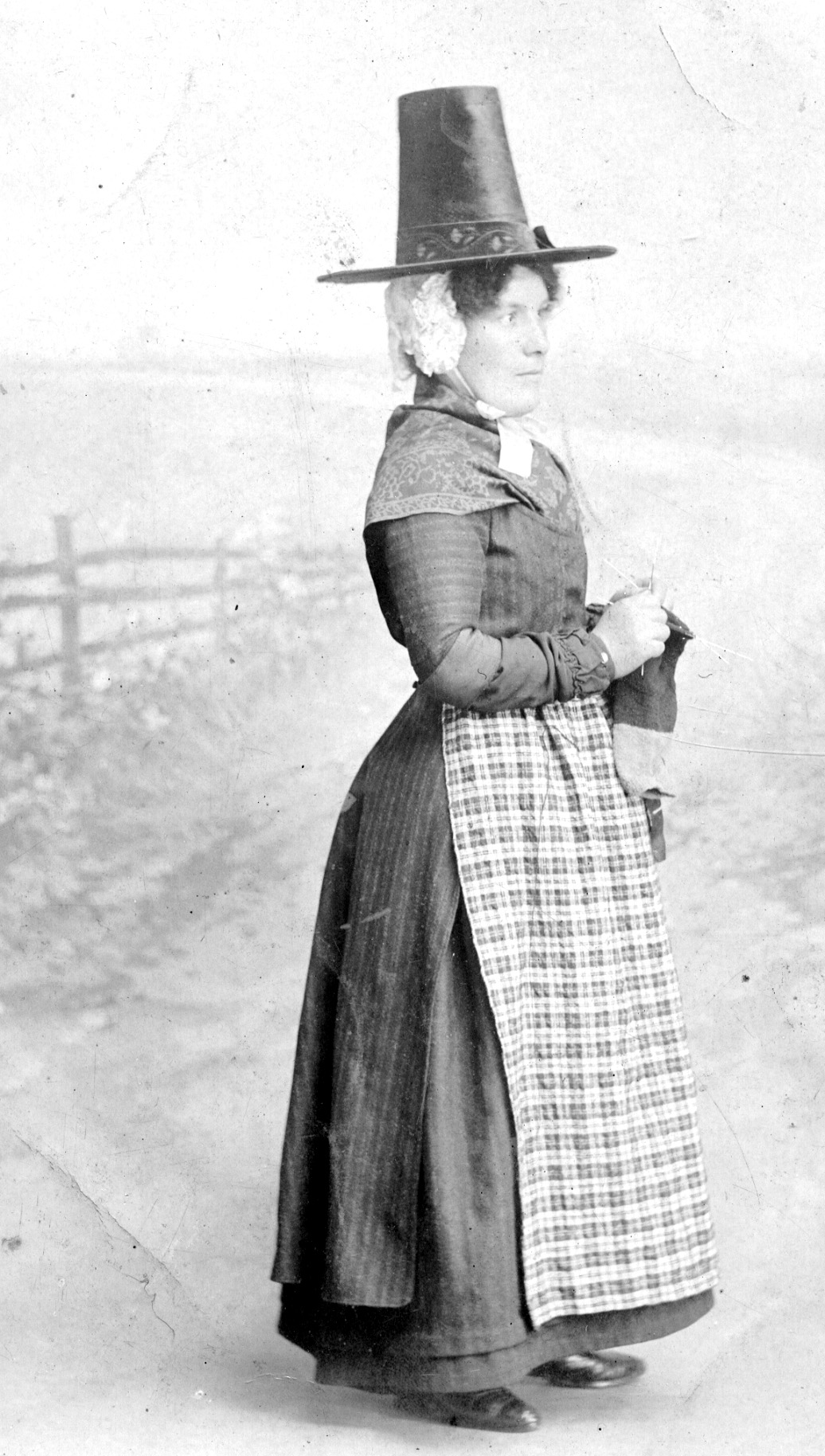

The Welsh hat (Welsh: Het Gymreig) worn by women as part of Welsh national costume is a tall hat, similar to a top hat, or the capotain. It is still worn by Welsh folk-dance women, and schoolgirls, in Wales on St David's Day, but rarely on other occasions.

Two main shapes of Welsh hat were made during the 19th century: those with drum shaped (vertical sided) crowns were worn in north-west Wales, and those with slightly tapering crowns were found in the rest of Wales.

== History ==
The Welsh hat first appeared during the late 1700s; it became widely popular in the 1830s and over 380 examples are known to have survived. The Welsh hat was part of a traditional Welsh costume propagated by Augusta Hall, Baroness Llanover (1802–1896) but it is unlikely that she had much influence on anyone other than her friends and servants.

The hat may have developed from a number of types of tall hat including the riding hat, which ladies wore during the early part of the 19th century, (as illustrated in the Llanover prints) but no evidence has been discovered which explains why, during the 1830s, the tall hat with the stiff, flat brim, which is unique to the Welsh hat, replaced the other types of men's hat worn by many rural women in Wales at the time.

By the late 1840s the Welsh hat had become an icon of Wales and was used in cartoons to represent Wales as a nation. It brought forward the image of a happy, hearty, healthy, hard-working Welsh woman. It became part of the national identity and was normally worn with the other elements of Welsh costume, especially the gown or bedgown (Welsh: gŵn or betgwn). It continues in use as an icon of Wales in tourist literature.

By the time Sydney Curnow Vosper painted the iconic Salem in 1908, the hat was no longer fashionable, but Vosper still felt the women he painted should wear the now iconic hats. The hat was so rare by the early 20th century that it is thought Vosper could only find one in the local area, and had to share it amongst the models, painting the same hat into the composition four times.

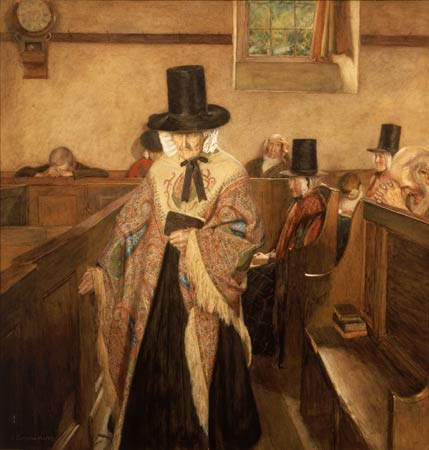
Sydney Curnow Vosper's 1908 watercolour Salem is one of the most iconic images of Wales. It depicts four women all wearing the same hat. In reality, the "Welsh hat" hadn't been worn for decades at this point, and the artist struggled to even find one for the models to wear.

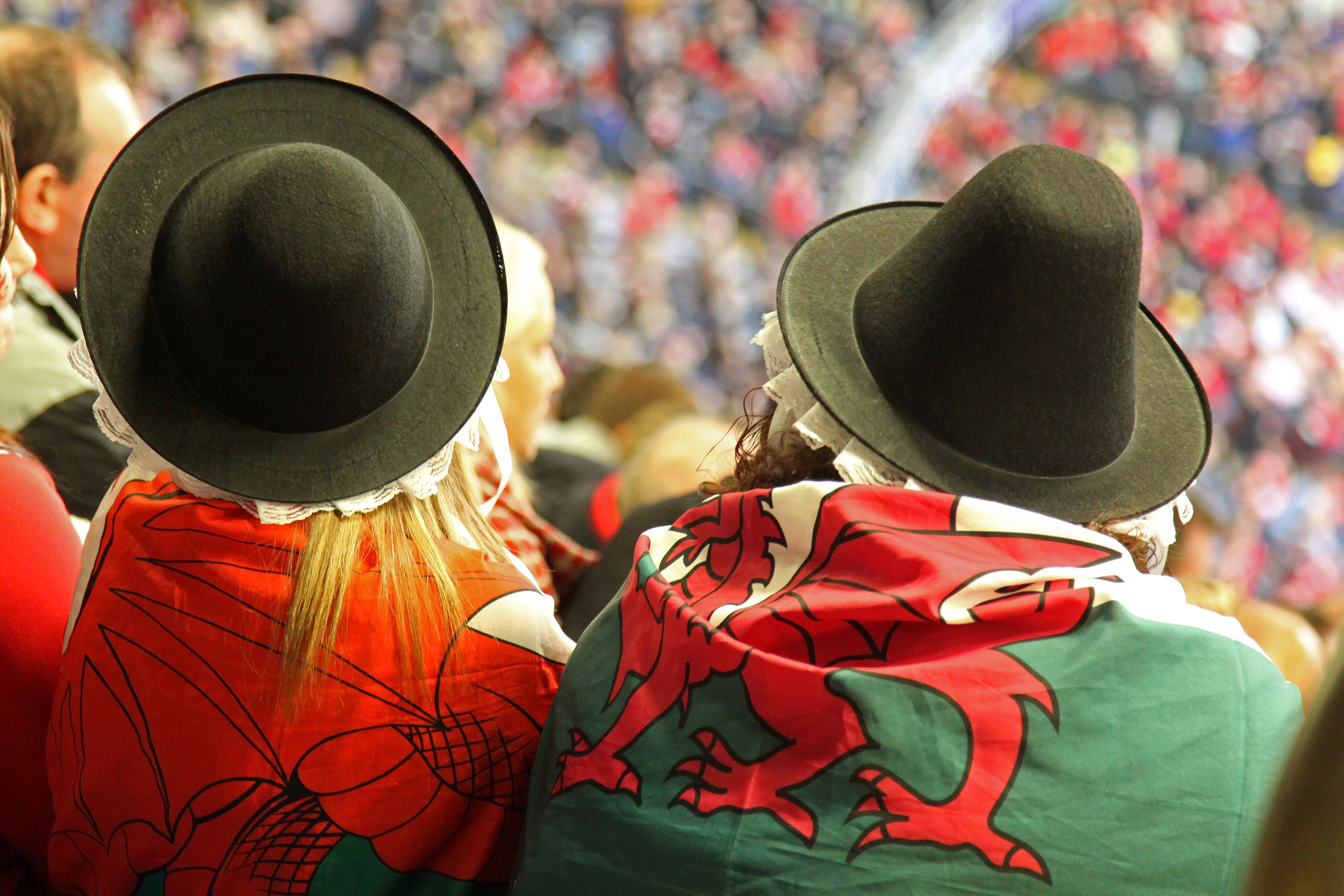
Two fans wearing the Welsh hat at an International Rugby match in Cardiff.

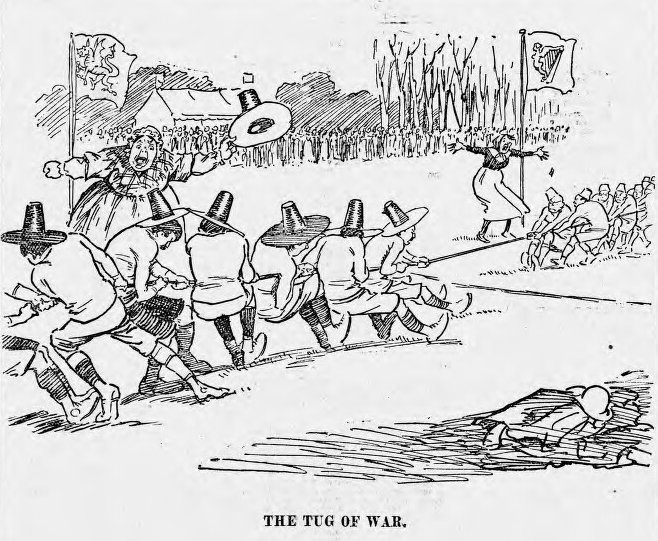
Cartoon by J. M. Staniforth depicting the Ireland–Wales rugby game of 18 March 1899 as a tug-of-war; the Welsh team wear Welsh hats.

== Battle of Fishguard ==
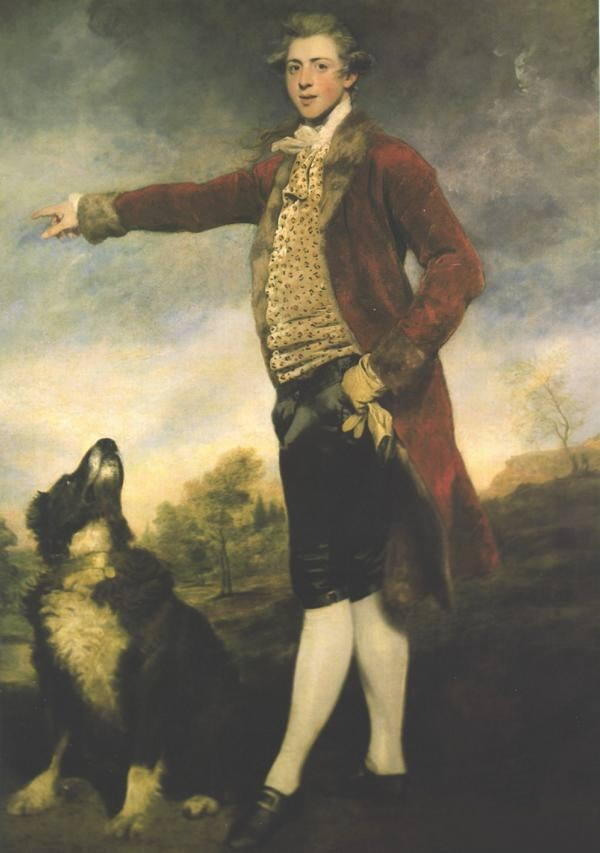
Lord Cawdor, whose successful bluff caused the French to surrender during the War of the First Coalition

During the War of the First Coalition, France attempted an invasion of Britain. During the February 1797 Battle of Fishguard, Colonel William Tate an Irish-American commanding French and Irish troops, landed near Fishguard in Wales. English and Welsh militia and civilians under the command of John Campbell, 1st Baron Cawdor hastily assembled to defend the town. When discipline began to break down among Tate's troops and their attempted invasion slowed down, Tate asked for surrender terms that would permit his command to leave. Instead of offering terms, Cawdor demanded unconditional surrender. As Tate and his subordinates considered Cawdor's demands overnight, Cawdor backed up his bluff with several deceptive measures. According to local lore, these included having women in traditional Welsh costumes and Welsh hats line the cliffs near the French camp. From a distance, the women appeared to be British soldiers in red coats and shakos. Convinced that he was outnumbered, Tate surrendered and his troops were taken prisoner.

== Dating Welsh hats ==
It is difficult to date silk Welsh hats; they were being produced in significant numbers during the 1840s and it is possible that they went out of production only a decade or so later. Unlike other fashionable hats, the Welsh hat may have been worn by its owner for many years and then passed down to succeeding generations. The large numbers of surviving hats implies that they were invested with much more than being just an expensive fashion item.

== Manufacture ==
Nineteenth-century Welsh hats were made in the same way and with the same materials as top hats. Most surviving examples were made by Christy's of Stockport and London, and Carver and Co of Bristol who also made top hats. Some were made by hat makers in Wales.

The shell was made of buckram (linen fabric), strengthened with shellac or resin and covered with black silk plush (sometimes confusingly known as beaver) but some were made of felt (originally beaver fur, but later fur from other animals). During the 20th century most Welsh hats for adults were made of card covered in black fabric but a few were made of felt especially for Welsh dance teams and women's choirs. Welsh hats for children are made of felt and are normally worn with a cotton or lace cap underneath or may have lace attached to the underside of the brim.

== Cockle hat ==
There is an 'alternative' women's hat for those who consider the traditional Welsh hat unflattering, in the form of a "cocklewoman's hat", a flat felt hat tied with ribbons on which women balanced the heavy baskets of cockles which they gathered from the coast around Carmarthen Bay when taking them home to cook, and thence to market.

== Alternative usage ==
A derived meaning of 'Welsh hat' is an ancillary stack, usually black in colour and slightly conical, attached to the funnel of a ship to ensure cleaner disposal of exhaust from the engines. This arrangement was used in several passenger liners by the Orient Line in the 1950s.

== See also ==
- List of hat styles
