= Traditional Welsh costume =

Rural women's clothing in the 19th century, later adopted as national dress

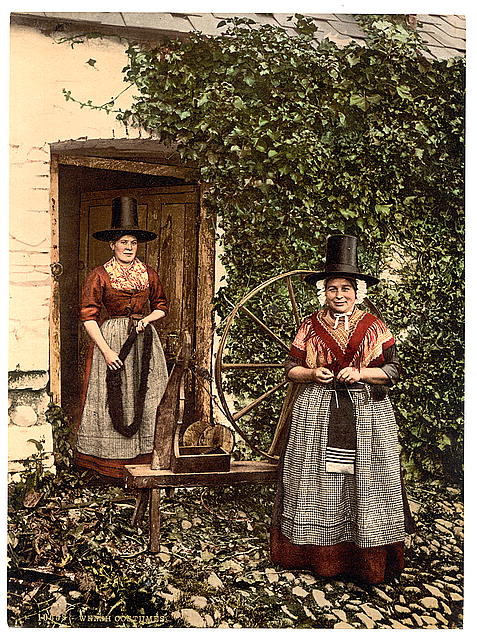
A late 19th century photo of women in a rural Welsh costume

The traditional Welsh costume (Welsh: Gwisg Gymreig draddodiadol) was worn by rural women in Wales. It was identified as being different from that worn by the rural women of England by many of the English visitors who toured Wales during the late 18th and early 19th centuries. It is very likely that what they wore was a survival of a pan-European costume worn by working rural women. This included a version of the gown, originally worn by the gentry in the 17th and 18th centuries, an item of clothing that survived in Wales for longer than elsewhere in Britain. The unique Welsh hat, which first made its appearance in the 1830s, was used as an icon of Wales from the 1840s.

It is likely that the Welsh costume began as a rural costume (with regional variations within Wales) and became recognized as a traditional costume by the wives and daughters of the better-off farmers, who wore it for special occasions and when going to market to sell their produce.

From the 1880s, when the traditional costume had gone out of general use, selected elements of it became adopted as a National Costume. From then on it was worn by women at events such as royal visits, by choirs, at church and chapel, for photographs and occasionally at eisteddfodau. It was first worn by girls as a celebration on Saint David's Day just before the First World War. The costume is now recognised as the national dress of Wales.

== History ==
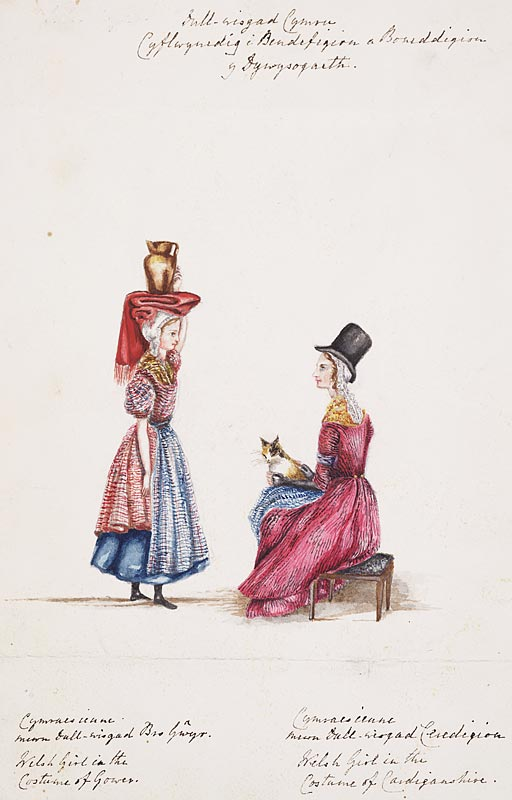
A study of the Welsh costume in parts of Gower (left) and Cardiganshire (right)

Very little evidence for traditional Welsh costume survives before about 1770 when the first tourists came to Wales and recorded in words and pictures the costumes worn by women in Wales. They noted that the women in rural parts of Wales wore a distinctive costume which varied from place to place. Women in towns and those who lived near the Welsh-English border or near busy ports were already wearing English fashions, often made of cotton.

During the 1830s, certain members of the gentry, especially Augusta Hall (later Lady Llanover) of Llanover near Abergavenny, recorded and tried to preserve some Welsh traditions, including costume. The prints of costumes of parts of Wales which she may have commissioned did not have a wide distribution. Some of them were published in an article in 1951. This was the first time that they had been published since the 1830s. Her apparent influence on Welsh costume was greatly exaggerated following the publication in 1963 of an article on Welsh Peasant costume and this caused the general misapprehension that she was responsible for either inventing or preserving traditional Welsh costume. From then on, many writers assumed that she had a great influence on the wearing of Welsh costume by rural women throughout Wales during the 19th century, which, it was supposed, led to the creation of a National Costume but there is very little evidence for this.

=== The origins of the national costume ===
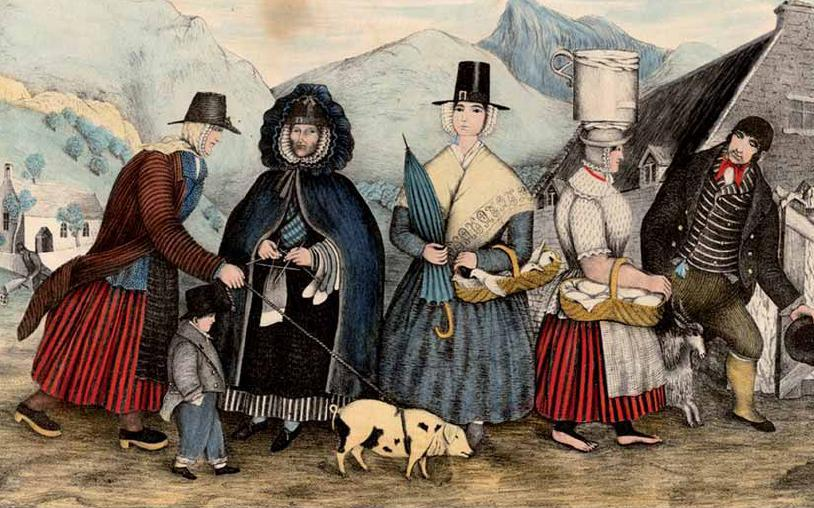
Welsh Fashions Taken on a Market Day in Wales (R. Griffiths, 1851)

Although the traditional costume went out of common use by the middle of the 19th century it was still worn by some women at market and for special events. There were calls for Welsh costume to be revived and used at major national events, especially royal visits. In 1834, Augusta Hall wrote a prize-winning essay for the Monmouthshire and Glamorganshire eisteddfod held in Cardiff but this contains very little about costume, and nothing about National costumes. In the 1840s Hall organised balls at which her friends wore costumes based on the set of fashion plates which she may have commissioned, but they were made of satins, not wool.

The adoption of the costume coincided with the growth of Welsh Nationalism, where the industrialisation of much of south Glamorgan was seen as a threat to a traditional agricultural way of life. The national costume made from Welsh wool was therefore seen as a visual declaration of a Welsh identity. During an 1881 visit by the Prince of Wales to Swansea, the Welsh costume was worn by a number of young women including members of a choir.

From the 1880s both old and modern versions of the costume were worn by performers at concerts and eisteddfodau, by stall holders at fund raising events and for royal visits. The numbers of women who wore Welsh costume in this way was always small but its use was remarkable enough to mention in reports of such events. Some of those who wore it may have been the younger members of the new middle-class families who could afford the money to buy the costumes and the time to attend such events. Although there was only a little encouragement to wear costumes at these events, those few who did were often spoken of with pride.

For some, wearing Welsh costume after the 1880s was an attempt to maintain tradition; for others it was to do with Welsh identity and nationality and possibly an attempt to distinguish themselves from incomers both in what they sold at market and the fact that many of them probably spoke Welsh; for a few it was to do with marketing traditional businesses, especially weaving. There is little evidence to support the suggestion that the Welsh costume was worn just to please visitors, but it possible that this happened.

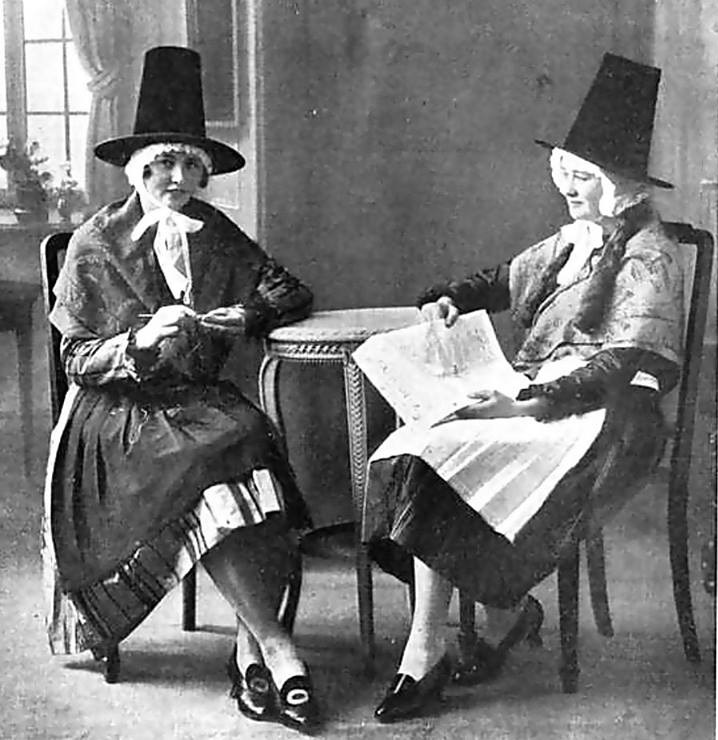
"Two Beauties Born in Chubut" The Traditional Welsh costume in the Welsh settlement in Argentina, September 26 1925

The young women who adopted the costume for special events from the 1880s were seen as the spirit of the new Wales and the costume became associated with success, especially after the Welsh Ladies’ Choir, dressed in Welsh costume, won a prize at the Chicago World Fair Eisteddfod World's Columbian Exposition in 1893 and went on to sing for Queen Victoria and performed at concerts throughout Britain.

=== Modern usage ===
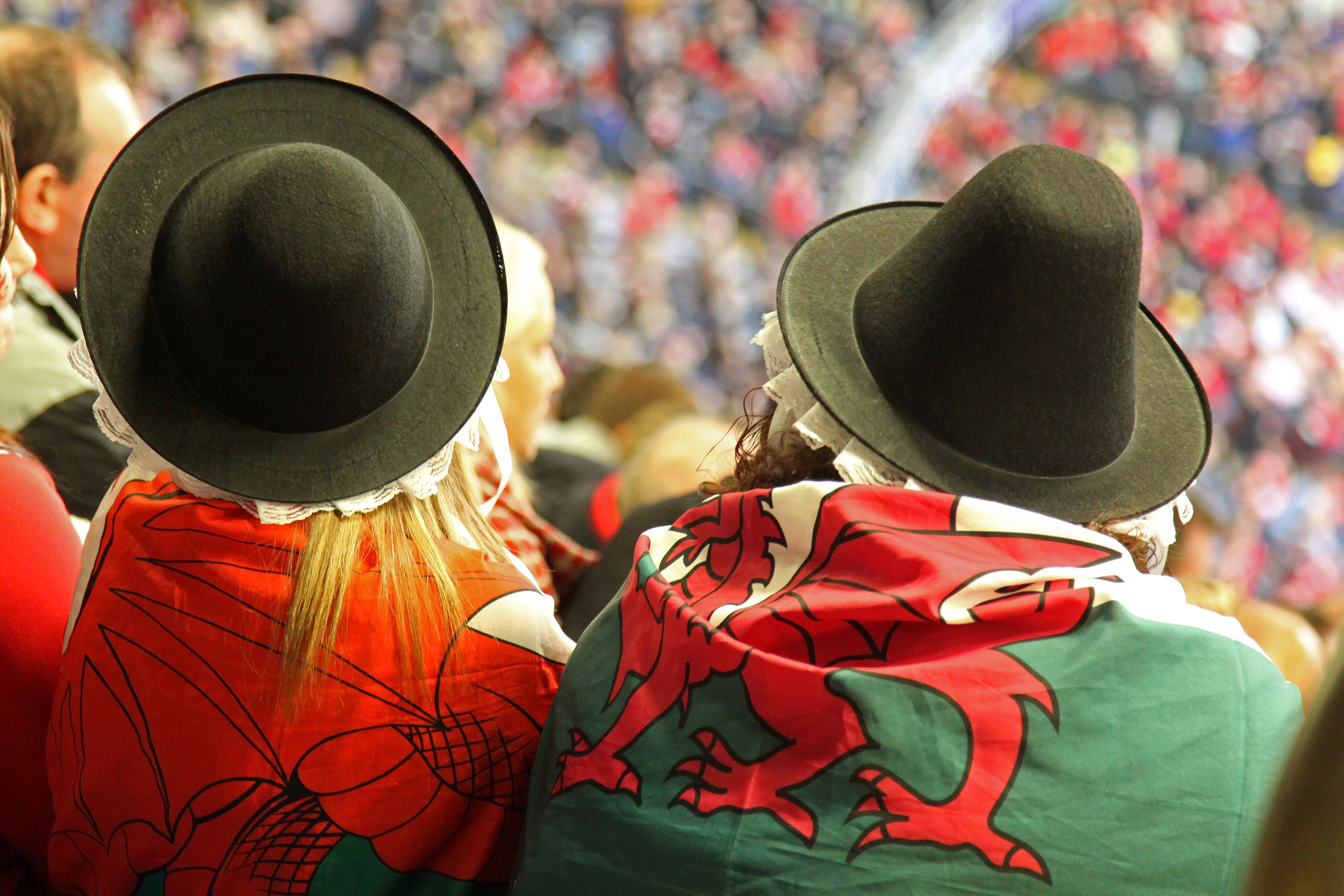
Two Welsh fans wearing elements of the national costume at an International Rugby match in Cardiff.

The modern costume worn by girls on St David's Day, which used to be made by mothers from old costumes, is now commercially available. The design, colours and use of lace (which was very rarely associated with Welsh costume during the 19th century), may well be derived from costumes made especially for those competing at the International Eisteddfodau at Llangollen (established in 1947) and other events where dancers required a comfortable and practical costume which was distinct from those worn by representatives from other nations. The costume now generally worn by dance teams is based on the tailored gowns originally found in south west Wales. The modern costumes worn by girls are normally red with white lace detailing, accompanied by a black and white chequered apron. A white shawl and a black hat are also worn, with many wearing the costume on St David's Day (Diwrnod Dewi Sant) accompanying the outfit with a yellow daffodil pinned onto it; the flower most associated with Wales.

== The elements of Welsh costume ==
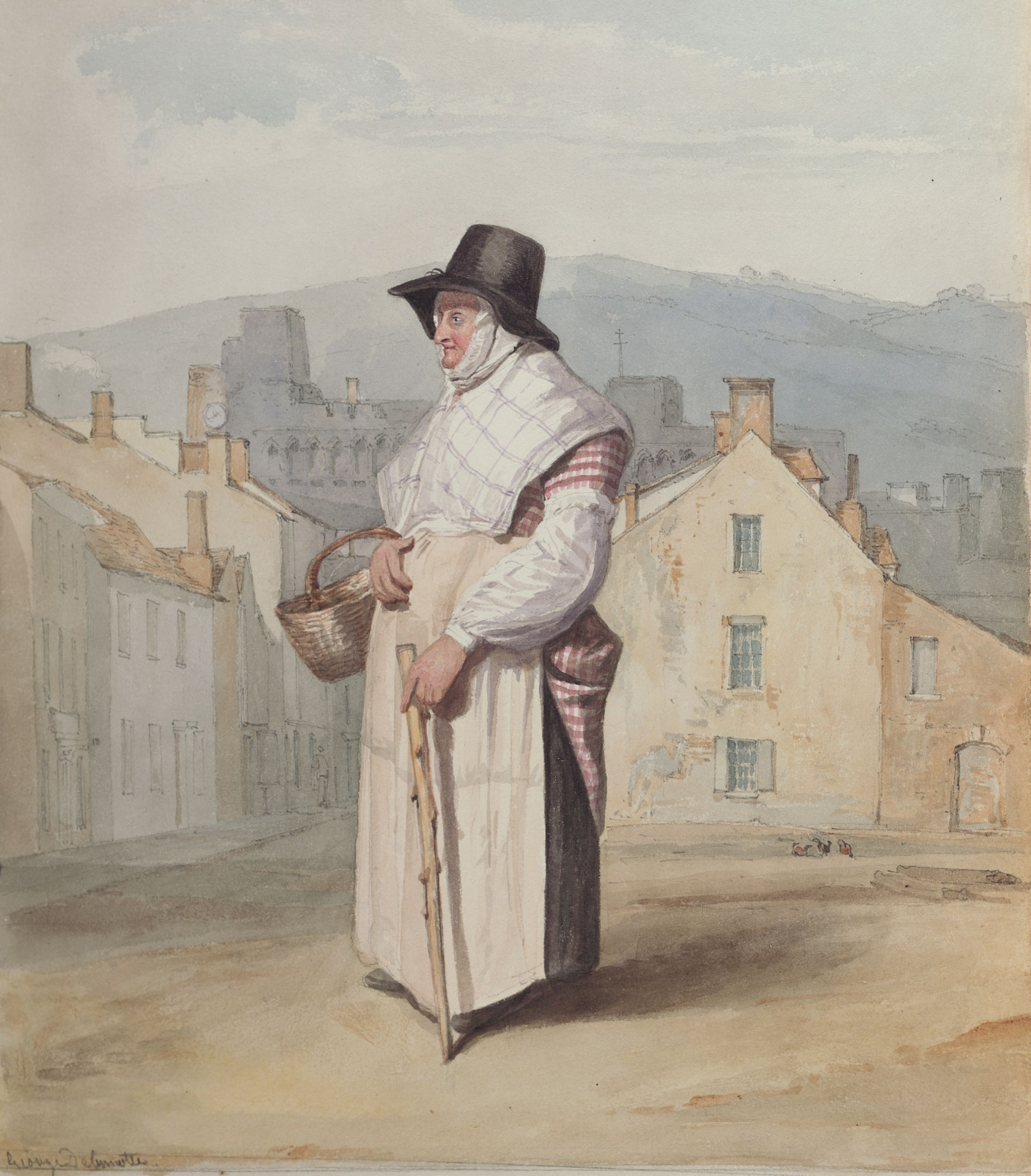
A portrait of a Swansea woman in Welsh dress, 1818

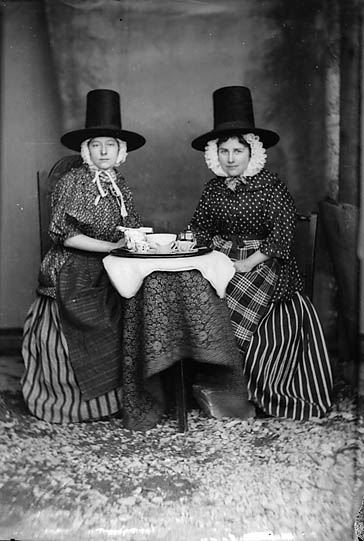
Two women in national dress drinking tea (c. 1875)

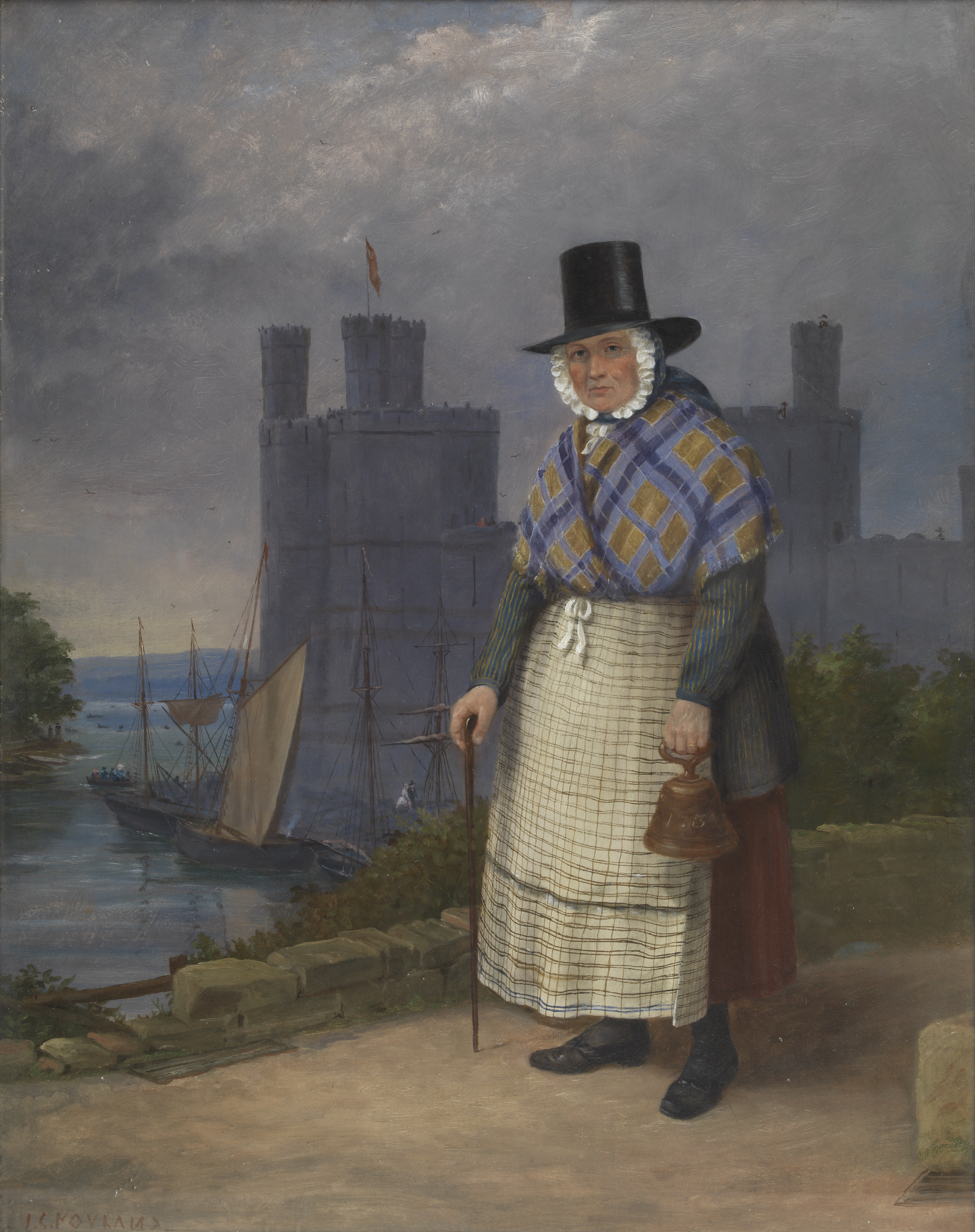
Bellringer of Caernarvon in costume of trade by John Cambrian Rowland, 187-

=== Components ===
==== The gown or bedgown ====
The most distinctive feature of the Welsh costume, other than the hat, is the gown and bedgown. Although both have often been referred to as bedgowns (spelt in various ways in Welsh, most commonly now as betgwn) the term gown is now used for the long-tailed, tailored garment.

(1) a tailored form with a tightly fitted low-cut top and long wide tail These were common in Ceredigion and Carmarthenshire and possibly in parts of mid-Wales and were often made of red and very dark blue or black striped flannel which was sourced locally. See example on the left in the illustration above 'Welsh Fashions Taken on a Market Day in Wales'.

(2) a loose T-shaped bedgown. The T-shaped form was found in north-west and south-east Wales; these were often of printed cotton.

(3) a shorter tailed, jacket, in plain fabric, worn in Pembrokeshire.

==== The skirt and underskirt (pais) ====
These were normally of heavy flannel with vertical or occasionally horizontal stripes in bold colours, often reds and dark blue or black and white.

==== The cape or mantle ====
They were long and often had large hoods (to cover the Welsh hat). Blue woollen cloaks were far more common than red ones in much of Wales until the 1860s.

==== The shawl ====
A variety of shawls were worn in Wales

(1) Square Shawl: Square shawl of wool in natural colours with a fringe all round. This was worn folded to form either a triangle or a rectangle and worn over the shoulders.

(2) Turnovers: Some of the finer printed shawls were made with two adjacent edges sewn face up on one face, and the opposite way on the other two edges so that when the shawl was folded diagonally, they both appeared face up.

(3) Whittle: Large rectangular or square woollen shawls with long fringes were worn around the waist and used to carry bread and other provisions. They were sometimes also worn as a mantle over the shoulders. Many of these were white or cream and occasionally red. They appear to have been more common in south Wales. A small version in red wool was worn round the shoulders in north Pembrokeshire and are said to have been worn by women who helped to repel the French during the Last invasion of Britain.

(4) Nursing shawl: A large square shawl with long fringes on all sides, made of natural white or cream wool was worn around the shoulder and waist to hold a baby, freeing the hands to do other tasks. These seem to have been worn throughout Wales, but were occasionally found in Welsh expatriate communities and continued in use until the 1960s and early 1970s.

(5) The Paisley shawl: Medium to large shawls of wool, silk or printed cotton were decorated with bright Paisley patterns. Many were fringed. Although these are thought to have been an essential part of Welsh costume, most were expensive and probably only worn only for very special occasions.

==== The handkerchief ====
Sometimes now referred to as a fichu, the handkerchief was a square piece of fabric, normally of printed cotton or linen, worn around the neck and tucked into the top of the gown, or worn over the head like a head scarf.

==== The apron ====
The apron was often of natural colours (white through cream and grey to black) in chequered patterns.

==== Stockings ====
Many women spent a lot of time knitting stockings but most were sold for export. Before about 1850 many rural women walked barefoot to and from market, or wore footless stockings.

==== The cap ====
Also known as the mob cap, the cap was a linen or cotton head cover with goffered folded fabrics around the face. Some had long lappets which hung down the front below shoulder level.

==== The Welsh Hat ====
The distinctive features of Welsh hats are the broad, stiff, flat brim and the tall crown. There were two main shapes of crown: those with drum shaped crowns were worn in north-west Wales and those with slightly tapering crowns were found in the rest of Wales. They were probably originally made of felt (known as beaver, but not necessarily made of beaver fur), but most surviving examples are of silk plush (also sometimes known as beaver) on a stiffened buckram base. A third type of hat, known as the cockle hat, was worn in the Swansea area.

=== Men's costume in Wales ===
Men were rarely illustrated or described wearing traditional attire in 19th century paintings. This was due to the fact that it was very similar to the attire worn by men in England. It consisted of a waistcoat (often of bright colours); a jacket often of blue or grey wool; a neckerchief; a pair of breeches; woollen stockings and a black felt hat, either like a bowler or one with a low, drum-shaped crown with a broad floppy brim. Although Welsh and English men's clothing were similar, the main difference between them in that Welsh clothing were often produced at locally. This meant that the majority of Welsh men wore blue or grey wool in the 18th century.

According to People's Collection Wales certain groups of men appeared in these illustrations more than every-day men:

(1) eccentric mountain guides;

(2) grooms at their wedding ceremonies;

(3) harpers;

(4) Welsh Cartoon men;

(5) coracle fishermen

The majority of men in these images are wearing breeches and stocking, as trousers did not start becoming popular until the French Revolution in 1789, however Welsh Men continued to prefer the wearing of these breeches. In the Welsh published book 'History of Penmachno' it stated that in 1807 trousers began to replace the use of breeches. However men who are depicted wearing breeches even after the rise in popularity of the use of trousers is due to the fact that those documenting their clothing wanted to depict traditional clothing or their 'Sunday Best' instead of their work clothes.

Unfortunately, due to working clothing being consistently worn by these men in the period, almost none of these clothes have survived from the 18th and 19th century. There has also been few documentation or evidence of the use of fabrics and style. It is seen probable that as the majority of Welsh clothing at the time was made out of wool, and that the wool was produced locally, this could be said the same for men's working clothes. However further research is needed. From descriptions given by tourists about rural Welsh workers was that their clothing was often drab in colour, although kerchiefs and waistcoats were sometimes described as brightly coloured.

==== Descriptions of men's costume ====
(1738)

"The summit of his head is commonly crown'd with a Monmouth Cap and its crown is commonly pinnacles with the Battlement of a button"

(1775)

"Saw several pair of flannel sheets drying. These were chiefly used by the common people who also frequently wear red flannel shirts"

(1791)

"Men and women are almost indistinguishable except for breeches"

(1798)

"The modern [man], like the ancient Briton, is not very attentive to food or clothing. The latter consists of a flannel jacket and breeches for men"

(1803)

"A farming party also appeared at this instant, proceeding with goods for Carmarthen market. This group was opened by a robust young fellow driving a couple of cows; he wore the general dress of the country, a short blue coarse cloth coat; and breeches of the same, open at the knees; but he also possessed the luxury of shoes and stockings"

(1804)

"I here had a specimen, if not a clerical poverty, at least of rusticity. A clergyman of the established church, dressed in a blue coat, striped waistcoat, a silk handkerchief round his neck, and a riding stick in his hand, stood in the throng, selling geese"

(1805)

"the men generally wear grey or drab coloured cloth, manufactured out of the wool of their own country sheep, coarsely and tickly woven"

(1807)

"The men wear a coarse woollen cloth of a sky blue colour for coat, breeches, and waistcoat, with worsted stockings of the same colour; through in Radnorshire the colour is a drab. Even many of the clergy are so prejudiced in favour of their paternal dress, that they despise a sable havit, and retain the country clothing"

(1827)

"Today the Welsh lasses have thot proper to clothe their legs and feet. Yesterday in one walk from Merthyr we saw so much nakedness as quite to shock us. This, bye the bye is one of the means of distinction between the sexes for we never see the men without shoes or stockings"

(1861)

"The men wear low-crowned hats, and are for the most part clothed in coats and vests of deep blue cloth, home spun and with brass buttons, have knee breeches of corduroy, and are very partial to showy silk neckcloths"

(1878)

"A short man, broad, clumsy, wearing a coat of sky-blue cloth, corduroy breeches to the knee, a motley woollen waistcoat, a blue ribbon hanging on his breast, indicating the nature of his office and message through the country which he tramped; black woolen stocking on his legs, and two strong leathern boots on his feet; a hat made of rough cloth on his half-bare head"

=== Gentry costume in Wales ===
Most gentry would have worn the latest fashions which they bought either via agents from Paris and London or from local tailors who read the articles on the latest fashions which most newspapers published. Again, clothing worn by the Gentry were very similar in style in England and Wales, However Welsh Gentry sourced their clothing locally.

=== Eccentric Dress ===
Although eccentric dress was not typically worn, it was worn by some mountain guides to achieve good payment, such as those guiding tourist up Cadair Idris and Snowdon.

== Evidence ==
=== Written descriptions ===
Over 80,000 words of descriptions of Welsh costumes were written during the 18th and 19th centuries, mostly by English middle-aged, middle-class men, but with a few exceptions – the descriptions by women tend to be lengthy and detailed and probably reliable. There are few descriptions in Welsh or by Welsh people in English (but see T. J. Llewelyn Pritchard's descriptions in his novel Twm Sion Catti). Almost no records of what the women who wore the traditional costumes thought about them have been found.

Much of what was written about Welsh costume was influenced by the observer's preconceptions: many of the visitors to Wales at the end of the 18th century came in search of the picturesque and of an Eden or Arcadia and this may have coloured what they recorded. They were often delighted to find that many of the women they saw were healthy, happy and pretty and wore a costume which was distinct from that of English maids.

=== Visual arts ===
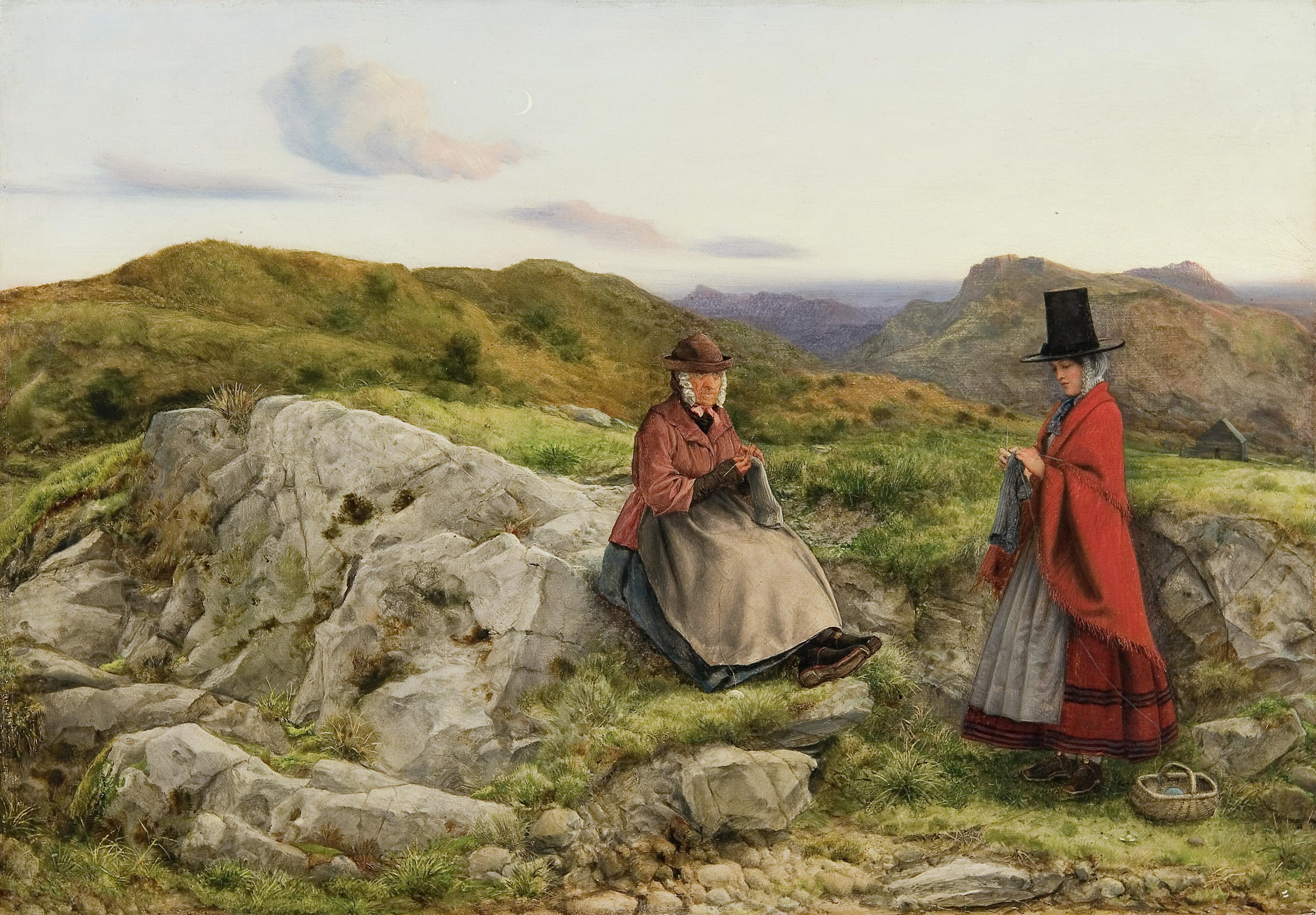
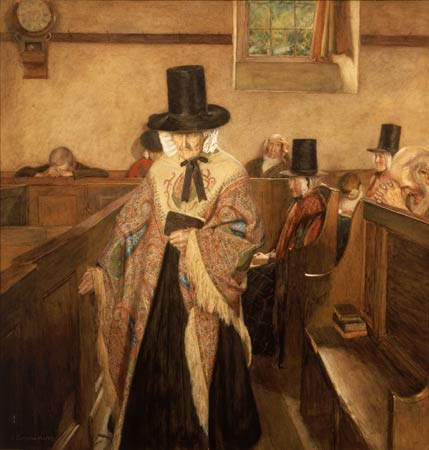
William Dyce's 1860 painting Welsh Landscape with Two Women Knitting (left) and Sydney Curnow Vosper's 1908 watercolour Salem (right) are two of the most recognisable images of the traditional Welsh costume.

The costume is a prominent feature in Welsh art, with about 700 images dated 1770–1900 in which Welsh costume is clearly depicted and a similar number of early 20th century photographs, mostly postcards, some based on earlier photographs while others were comic. Many of these images of Welsh costume were marketed as souvenirs of Wales and they helped to preserve the concept that there was something unique about Welsh costume. Most of the photographs were 'staged' by the photographers and the women often wore their own old costumes or borrowed a set from the photographer as in the example above 'Two women in national dress drinking tea' which is one of 80 photographs taken by John Thomas (1838–1905) of young women who wore a selection of garments from three sets of costumes that he kept.

=== Surviving costume ===
There are a few surviving Welsh costumes in museums and private collections. Most of them are stored in the St Fagans National History Museum near Cardiff and the Ceredigion Museum in Aberystwyth. They are very difficult to date and the source of the original fabrics is often unknown.

=== Dolls ===
About eighty 19th-century dolls dressed in Welsh costume are known. Many have genuine Welsh costume fabrics which may be the oldest surviving fabrics of their kind. Almost every female member of the royal family since Princess (later Queen) Victoria's visit in 1832 was given a doll dressed in Welsh costume when she visited Wales. This shows that even at this early date, the Welsh costume was considered something special, and was being marketed along with costume prints.

== Gallery ==
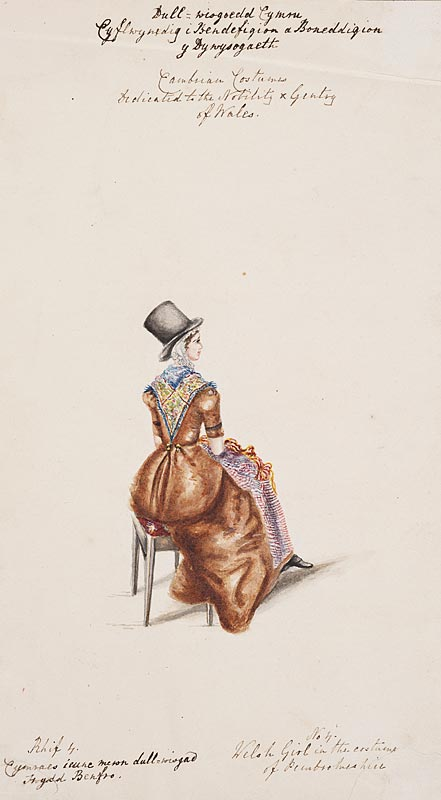
1830; Pembroke

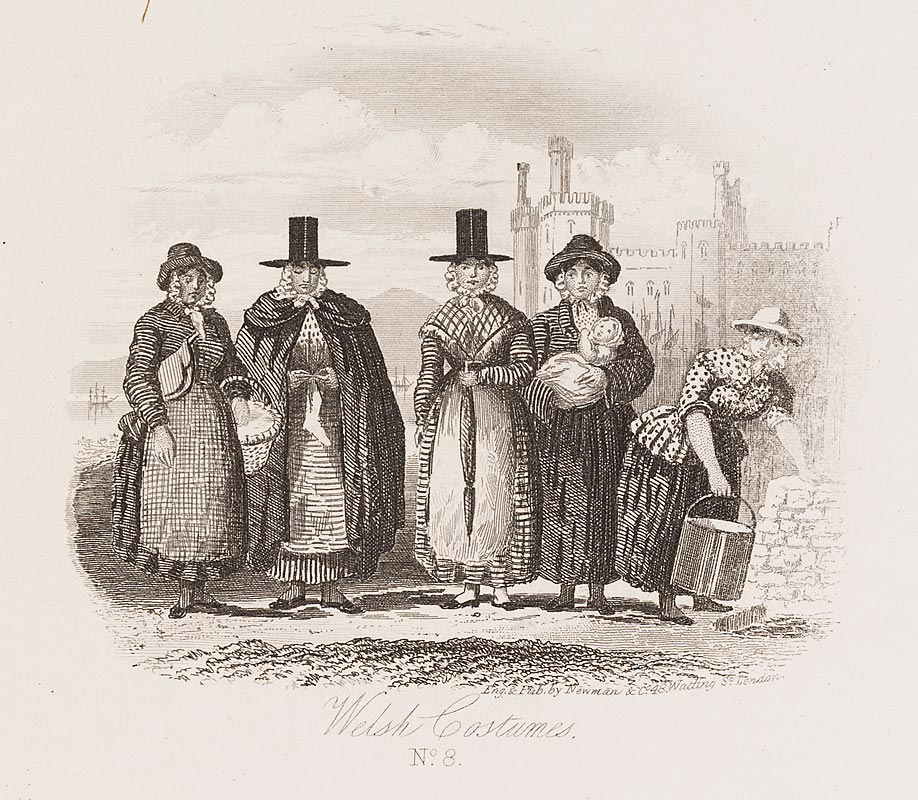
1850s or 60s; Gwent

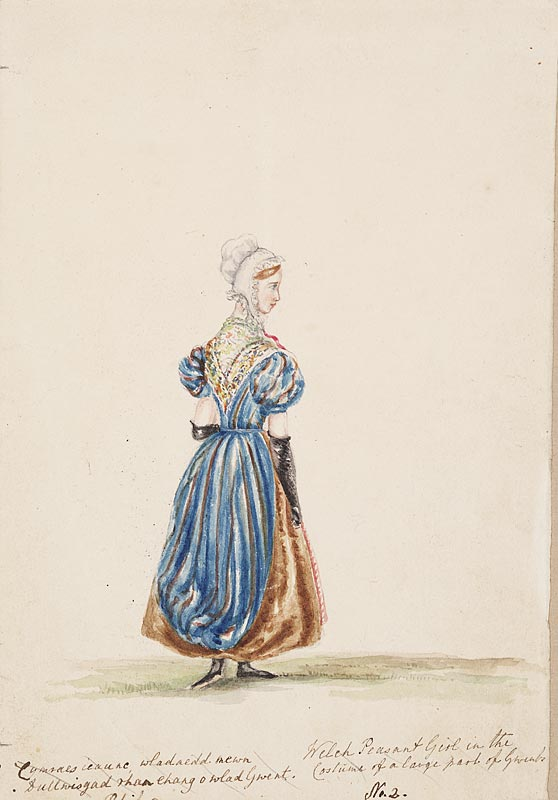
1830; Gwent

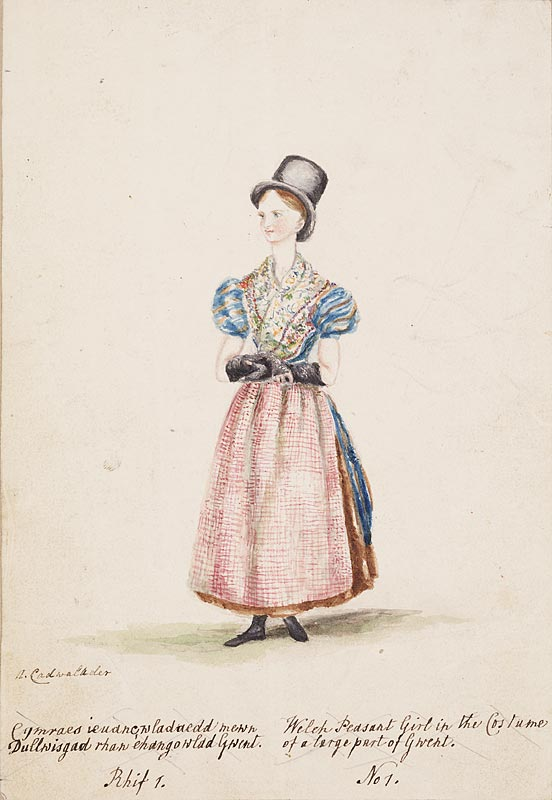
1830; Gwent

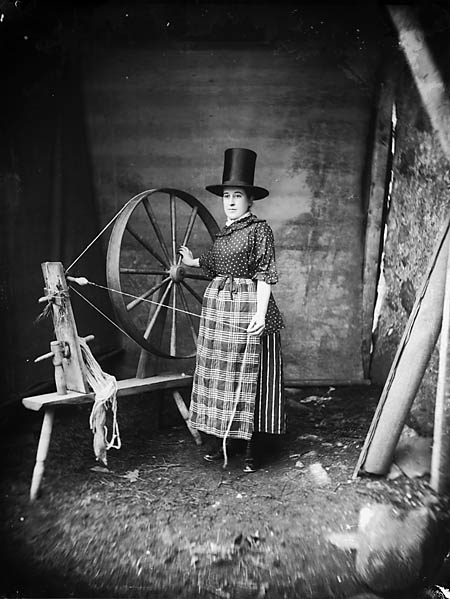
1885

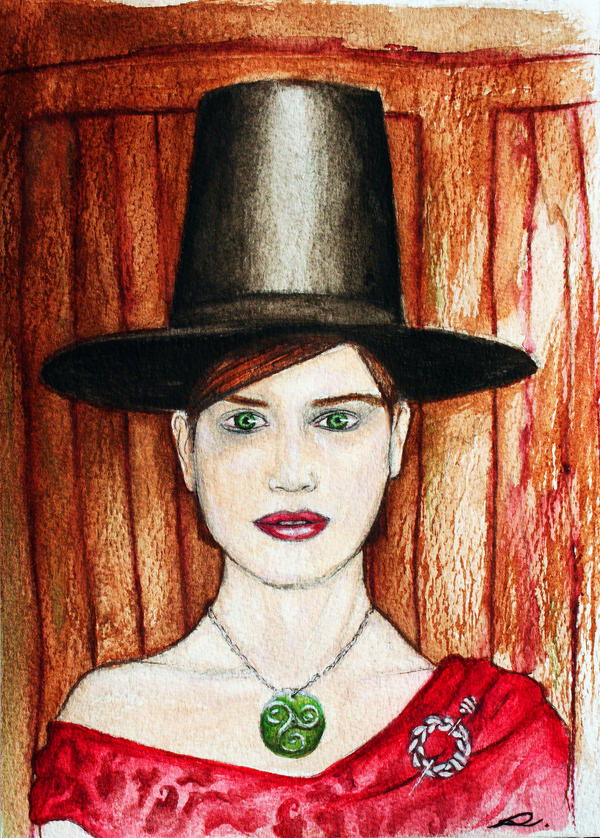
2014
