= Pentre Gwynfryn =

Village in Wales

Coordinates: 52.823°N 4.084°W

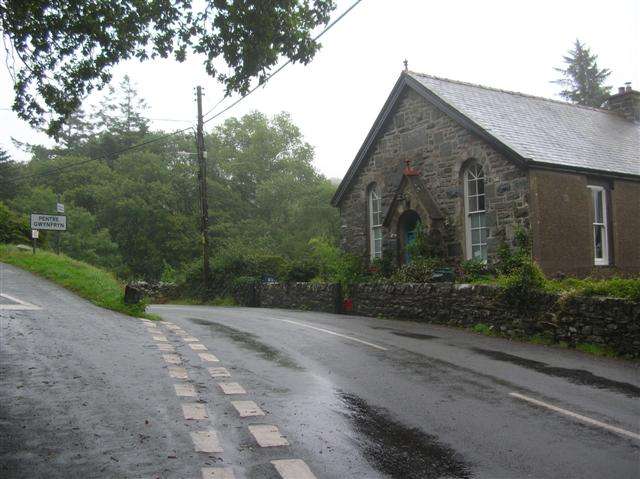
- The chapel at Pentre Gwynfryn

- Location within Gwynedd
- OS grid reference: SH596270
- Community: Llanbedr
- Principal area: Gwynedd
- Preserved county: Gwynedd
- Country: Wales
- Sovereign state: United Kingdom
- Post town: HARLECH
- Postcode district: LL46
- Dialling code: 01341
- Police: North Wales
- Fire: North Wales
- Ambulance: Welsh
- UK Parliament: Dwyfor Meirionnydd
- Senedd Cymru – Welsh Parliament: Dwyfor Meirionnydd

Pentre Gwynfryn is a village in the Ardudwy area of Gwynedd, Wales, about 1 mile (1.6 km) east of Llanbedr. The village is at the confluence of the River Artro and the River Cwmnantcol.

The inside of the village's chapel (Capel Salem) was made famous by the painter Sydney Curnow Vosper, whose 1908 work Salem features a member of the congregation, Siân Owen, in traditional Welsh costume. The folds around the left arm of her richly rembroidered cloak are supposed to form the face of the devil, who has taken over the proud woman. A more obvious devil's face is seen peering in through the window. The painting hangs in the Lady Lever Art Gallery at Port Sunlight on the Wirral.
