= Sydney Curnow Vosper =

English painter

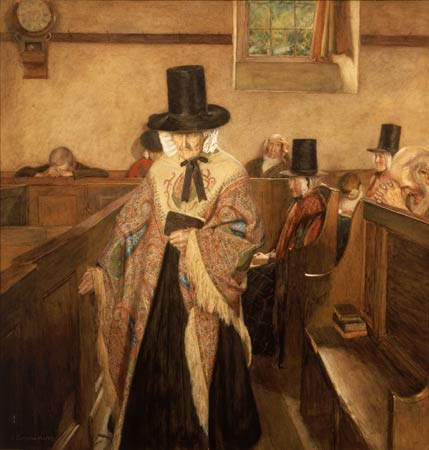
- Salem (1908)
- Born: 29 October 1866; Stonehouse, Plymouth, Devon, England
- Died: 10 July 1942 (aged 75); Shaldon, Devon
- Education: Académie Colarossi, Paris

Sydney Curnow Vosper RWS, RWA (29 October 1866 – 10 July 1942) was an English painter and etcher of landscapes and figure subjects. His later work has a close association with Wales and Brittany. His most famous work is Salem (1908), which shows an old woman in the Welsh national costume, with Welsh hat and shawl, attending a service at Salem Baptist Chapel, Pentre Gwynfryn.

== Personal history ==
Vosper was born in Stonehouse, Plymouth, in 1866 to Samuel, a brewer, and Eleanor Vosper. He attended a school in Somerset and Plymouth College. Following this he spent three years as an architect's apprentice before beginning his artistic career as an illustrator in London. He would later leave to study for three years at the Académie Colarossi in Paris, studying under Raphaël Collin. As a watercolour painter, Vosper began exhibiting his work in local art galleries throughout England, but also at the Paris Salon and the Royal Academy. Vosper painted landscapes but is perhaps best known for his figure painting. A favoured subject was the town and people of Le Faouët in Brittany.

A turning point in Vosper's work occurred when he married Constance James, the daughter of Frank T. James, a solicitor and former mayor of Merthyr Tydfil. This connection to Wales would change his output, and in his later career his paintings would be heavily influenced by Welsh culture and life. He died on 10 July 1942 at the Teign House Hotel, Shaldon, Devon, having also lived at Westbourne Terrace in the Bayswater district of London.

== Salem ==
Vosper's most famous work is Salem, a watercolour of the interior of Salem Chapel in Cefncymerau (modern day Llanbedr, Wales), with its central figure dressed in traditional Welsh costume, wrapped in a shawl and clutching a Bible. The painting, in watercolour on a piece of paper measuring 71.1 × 69.8 cm was completed in 1908 and exhibited in the Royal Academy in London in 1909. Of the eight people in the painting, seven of them sat for Vosper, including the central character who was modelled by Siân Owen (1837–1927) of Tŷ'n-y-fawnog. A dummy was used for the eighth, but only one was an actual member of Salem. The painting was bought in 1909 in by the industrialist William Hesketh Lever for 100 guineas. The painting gained mass appeal in Britain when it was used to promote Lever Brothers' Sunlight soap. The soap bars came with collectable tokens that could be exchanged for prints of the painting, which resulted in many homes owning a copy, during a period when few homes owned any form of art.

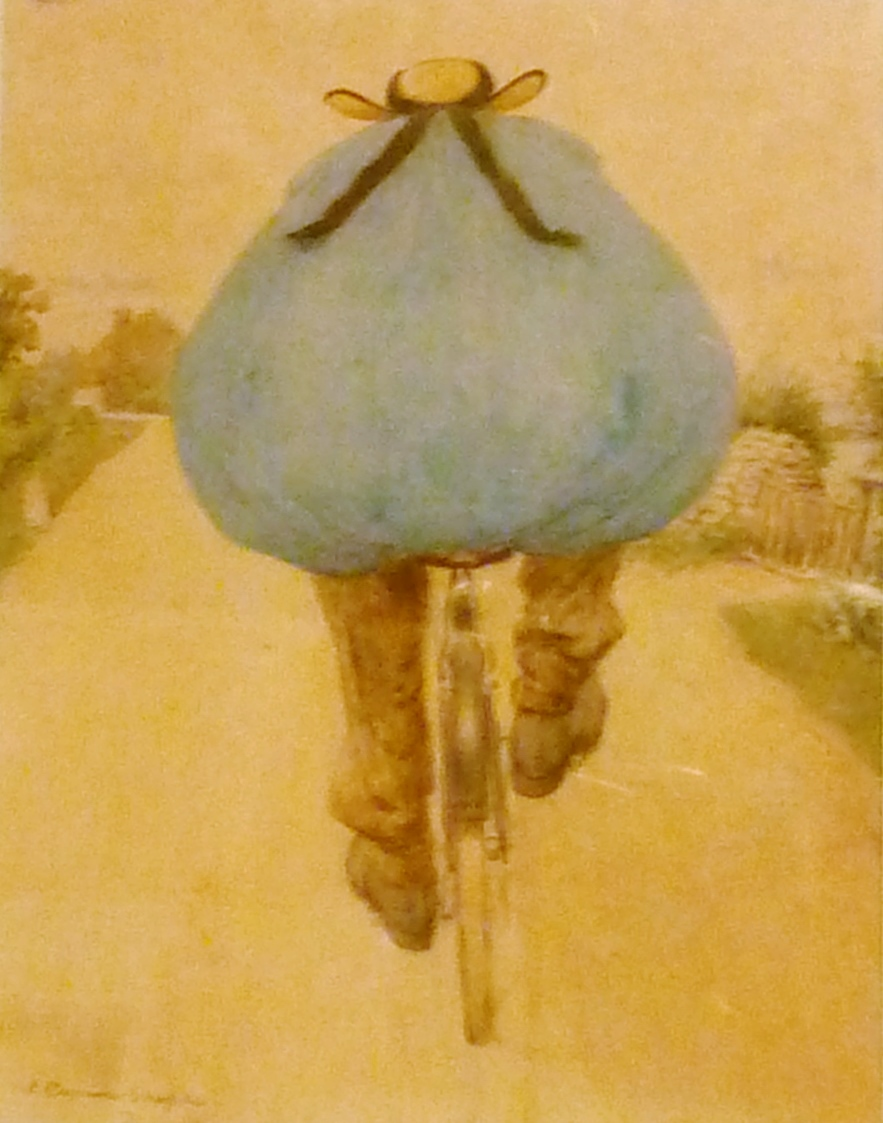
Un cultivateur mécanique (1906), oil on card, Musée du Faouët, Le Faouët, Morbihan, France

The picture featured regularly in Welsh-language publications, including in Y Ford Gron ('The Round Table') in 1933, as print copies sold via the Urdd in 1937, and in the Cymru Fydd calendar in the 1950s. In 1942 it was described by Yr Aelwyd ('The Hearth') as "one of the most beautiful pictures of the religious life of Wales in old times .."

The painting gained notoriety when it was believed that the face of the devil could be seen in the folds of Siân Owen's shawl. Though this may be a reaction to the other often-noticed illusion of a face staring through the chapel window, which in turn made people look for other supernatural elements or mistakenly thinking the face was in the shawl. The artist denied that he ever intentionally painted any such detail into the watercolour. The painting also became extremely popular in Wales, offering to a population which was rapidly becoming industrialised a reminder of a rural past and a close connection to the Nonconformist religious background of the country. The painting is one of the most iconic images of Wales ever created.

The work is currently exhibited at the Lady Lever Art Gallery at Port Sunlight in Merseyside, though there have been several request for the painting to be moved permanently to a Welsh museum. In 2013 it formed the centrepiece of a temporary exhibition at the Gwynedd Museum and Art Gallery in Bangor.

Siân Owen would feature in a second of Vosper's works, Market Day in Old Wales (c. 1910).

== Bibliography ==
- Waters, Grant M. (1975). Dictionary of British Artists Working 1900–1950. Eastbourne Fine Art. ISBN 978-0-904722-37-6.
- Williams, Tal (1991). Salem Y Llun a'r Llan/Painting and Chapel. Cyhoeddiadau'r Barddas. ISBN 978-1-906396-13-8.
