= Bedgown =

Women's informal garment for the upper body

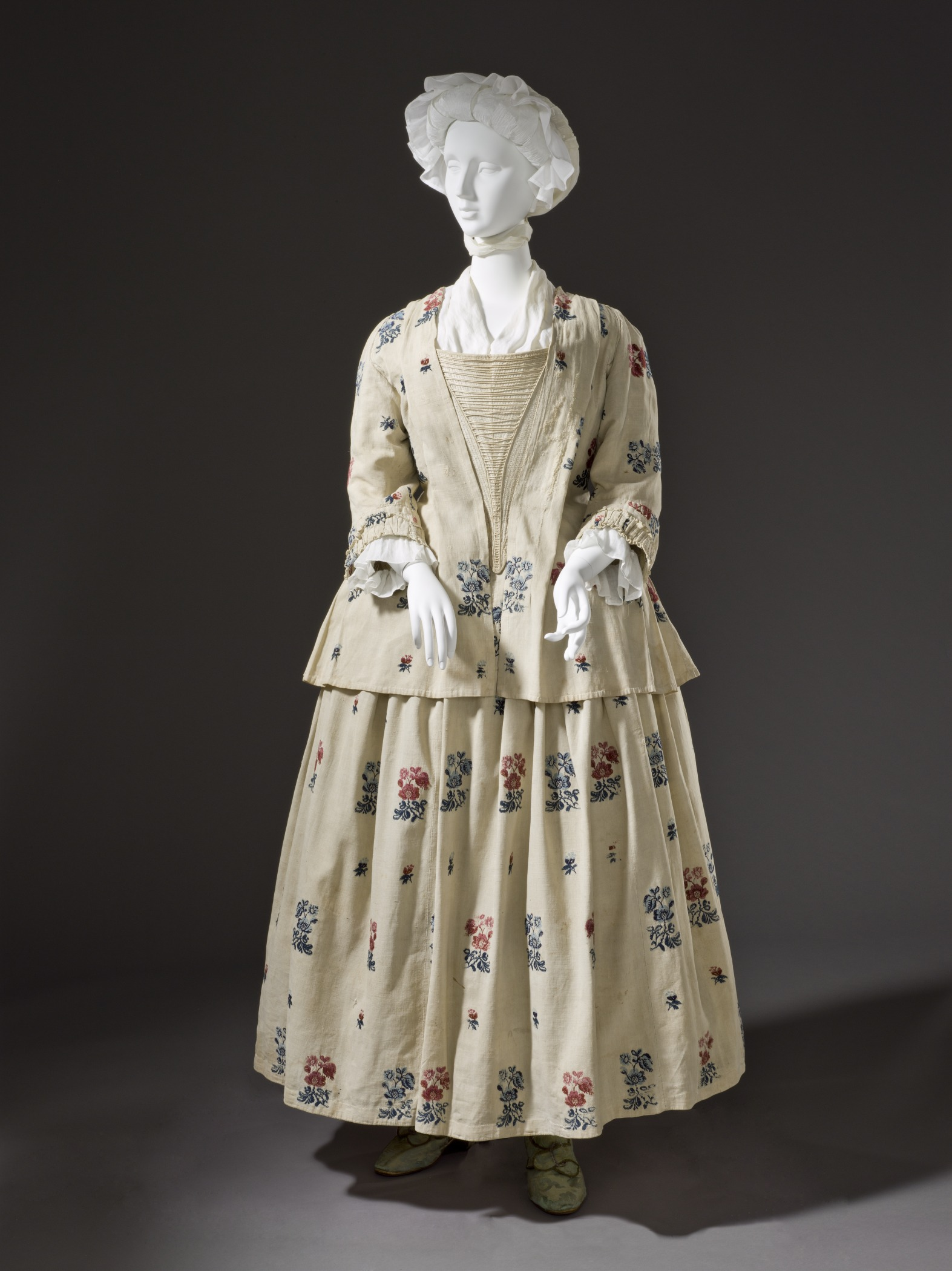
Woman's Bed Gown and Petticoat, France or England 1750–1775.

A bedgown (sometimes bed gown, bedjacket or shortgown) is an article of women's clothing for the upper body, usually thigh-length and wrapping or tying in front. Bedgowns of lightweight printed cotton fabric were fashionable at-home morning wear in the 18th century. Over time, bedgowns (also called in this context shortgowns) became the staple upper garment of British and American female working-class street wear from the 18th to early 19th centuries, worn over petticoats and often topped with an apron. Made of sturdy cotton, linen, wool or linsey-woolsey, these bedgowns were simply cut to a T-shaped pattern, and were worn overlapped in front or with the front skirts cutaway. The term "bed gown" to describe this item of clothing was used as late as 1876.

In the Welsh spelling betgwn, the bedgown is part of traditional Welsh costume.

Bedgowns lingered as fashion garments into the mid-20th century, usually under the newer name bedjackets, in the form of short robes or wrappers worn over a nightgown or negligee for warmth and modesty while sitting up in bed for breakfast, reading, or similar pursuits. They had mostly fallen out of fashion by the 1960s.

== See also ==
- 1750–75 in Western fashion
