= Joseph Morewood Staniforth =

Welsh editorial cartoonist

J. M. Staniforth
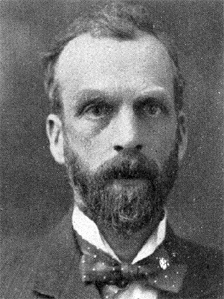
- Born: Joseph Morewood Staniforth c. 1864; Gloucester, England
- Died: 21 December 1921 (aged 56–57); Barnstaple, Devon, England
- Known for: Editorial cartoon; Drawing

Joseph Morewood Staniforth (c. 1864 – 21 December 1921) was a Welsh editorial cartoonist best known for his work in the Western Mail, Evening Express and Sunday weekly the News of the World. Staniforth has been described as "...the most important visual commentator on Welsh affairs ever to work in the country."

== Biography ==
Staniforth was born in Gloucester in c. 1864, the son of a Sheffield tool repairer named Joseph Staniforth. His family moved to Cardiff in South Wales in 1870, and after leaving school at 15, Staniforth trained as a lithographic printer for the Western Mail before becoming an art reviewer. A promising young artist, he studied at the Cardiff School of Art, which was run from rooms above the Royal Arcade in the town centre. His classmates included the sculptor Goscombe John. Staniforth originally worked primarily in paint, but slowly moved from brush work to inks where he found a talent for cartoons and caricature. He started publishing cartoons in 1889 after being spotted by the Western Mail's editor Henry Lascelles Carr.

His work, with which I have been familiar from the beginning of my political career, has always given me great pleasure, and I still recall with interest those early cartoons in which he satirised me – cartoons always free from malice and from any suggestion of coarseness, and marked by a rare quality of subtle humour.

— Prime Minister David Lloyd George's tribute to Staniforth following his death.

Usually published in the Western Mail, Staniforth's drawings and cartoons covered political and social unrest in Wales from 1890 through to the First World War of 1914-1918. Although his cartoons followed editorial lines, with editor Carr appearing in several stating his own opinion, Staniforth himself veered more towards the more tolerant Liberal-Labour movement and would attack both capitalist coal owners and the socialist unions.

In 1911 the then Chancellor of the Exchequer, David Lloyd George, commissioned Staniforth to produce a piece of artwork to commemorate the investiture of Prince Edward as Prince of Wales at Caernarfon Castle. Lloyd George kept the artwork, in pencil and watercolour, and hung it in his study.

Staniforth was replaced at the Western Mail by Leslie Illingworth upon his death in 1921.

== Samples of political cartoons ==
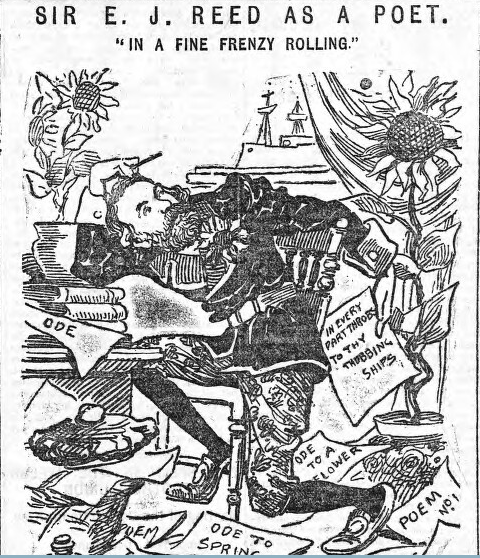
Sir Edward James Reed as a poet, 1891

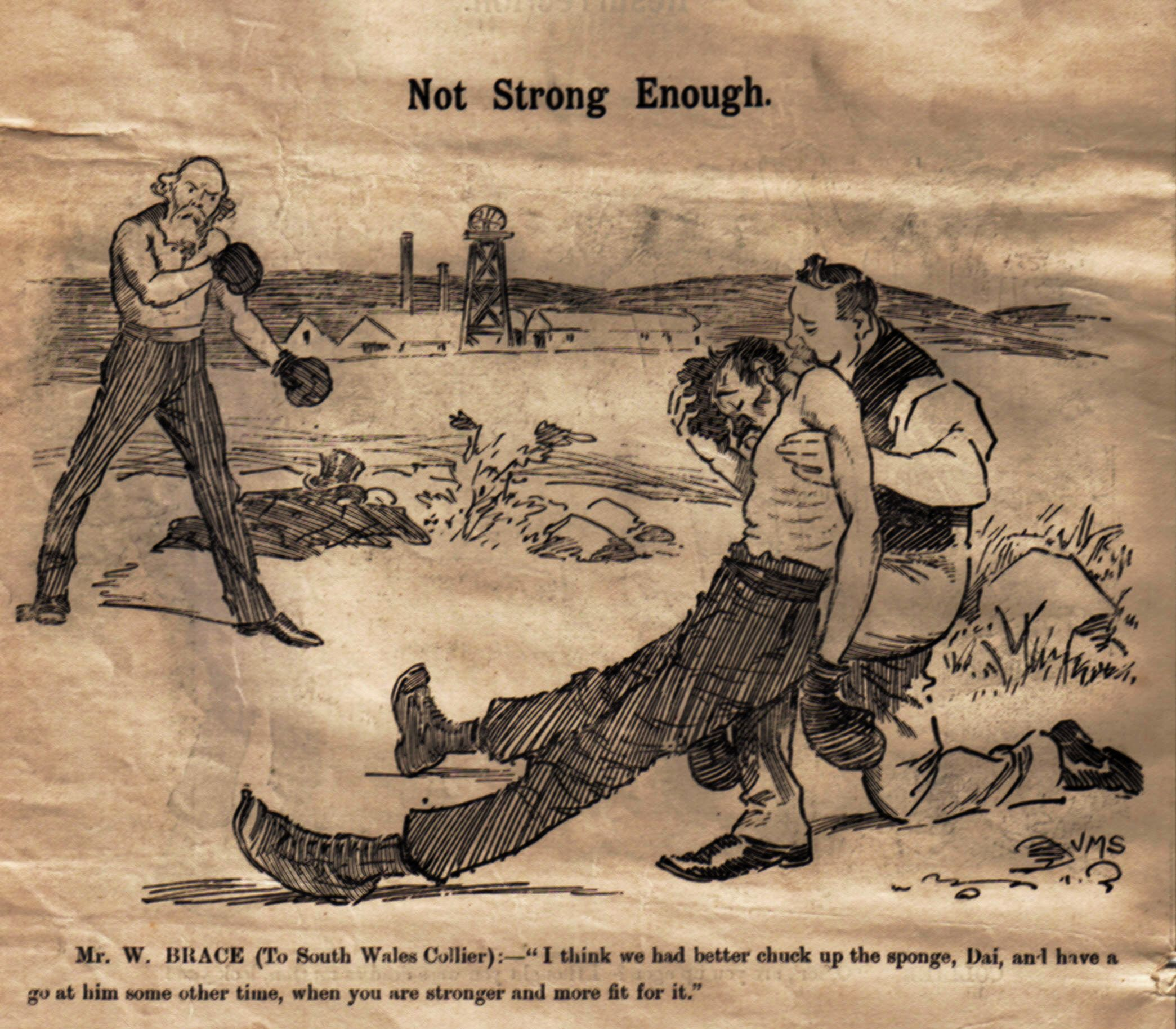
Western Mail cartoon by Staniforth from 8 June 1898, produced during the Welsh coal strike

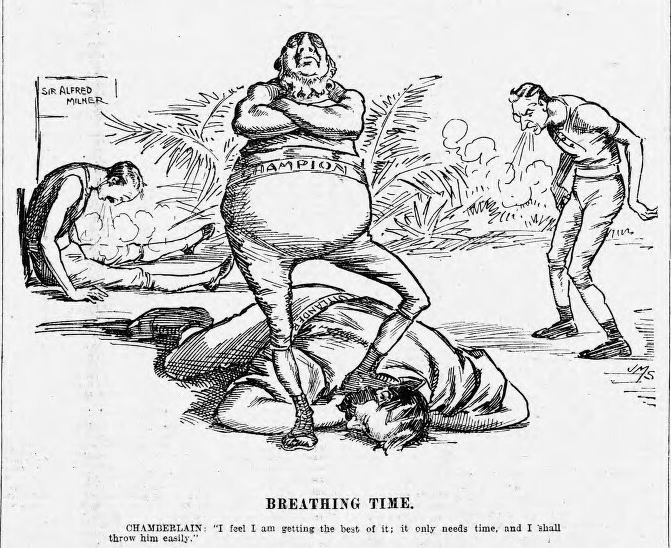
Commentating on the events leading to the Second Boer War, 1899

== Dame Wales ==
One of Staniforth's more famous creations was "Dame Wales" (or Mam Cymru), a middle-aged woman dressed in the Welsh national costume, along with Welsh hat, who would embody Wales in a similar way that other cartoonists would use Britannia to symbolise the United Kingdom in general or the British Empire. Staniforth stated in a 1906 interview that he felt that Wales needed a specific symbol as a counterpart to John Bull who was used in cartoons as another representation of the United Kingdom in general, and after discussions with a colleague, Staniforth created what he believed would be a characteristic Welsh dame. Dame Wales was normally the voice of reason in Staniforth's cartoons and is often pictured attempting to discourage others from making decisions that would damage the country. When a spoken caption was required, Dame Wales would often be depicted talking in a working class valleys vernacular, which stands out against the language used by the more educated figures of authority she challenges. Other cartoonists would later take up the figure of Dame Wales, and would keep the same image in their work.

=== Cartoons depicting Dame Wales ===
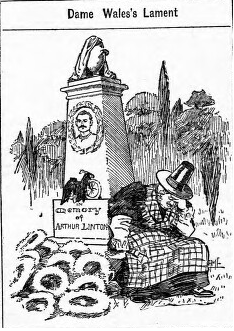
Mourning the death of cyclist Arthur Linton, 1896

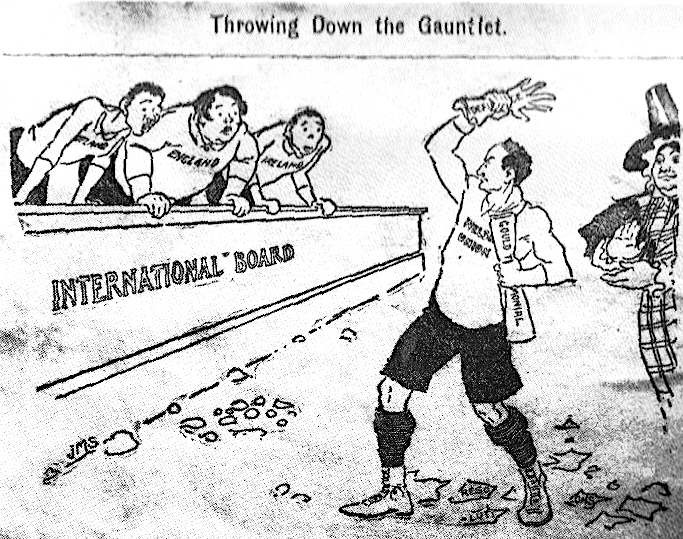
Applauding the stance of the Welsh Rugby Union, 1897

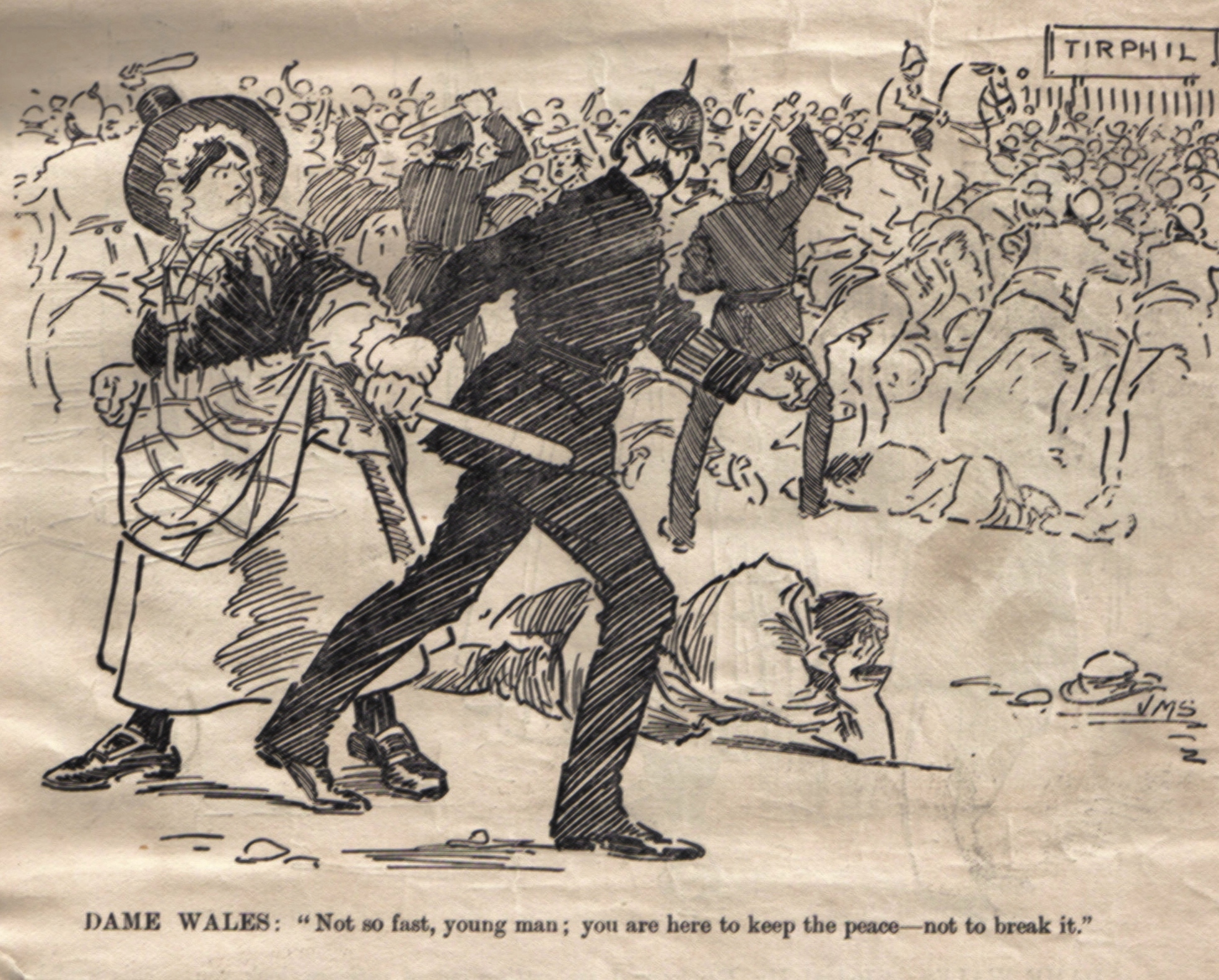
Confronting police at a strikers' "riot", 1898

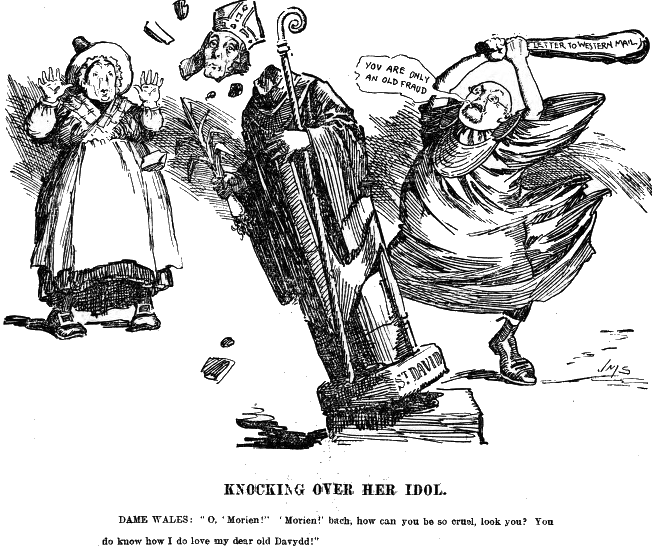
Welsh journalist and druidist Owen "Morien" Morgan destroys an image of Saint David with a cudgel, Dame Wales looks on in dismay, 1899
