= Cythraul =

Welsh term for the devil or evil spirit

Cythraul (formerly also Kythreul and Cythrawl) is a Welsh language word for The Devil or other incarnations of evil spirits. The word appears in Medieval Welsh literature and bardic poetry but has a wide variety of uses in modern Welsh and popular culture.

== Etymology ==
Cythraul probably deriving from Latin 'Contrarius', 'the Opposer, Enemy'. Contr- would go to Welsh cythr- straightforwardly according to historical phonology, and the form 'cythraul' not *cythraur is the result of dissimilation. It is likely to be an early Christian borrowing from Ecclesiastical Latin, like numerous other words in the Welsh and Irish languages. Diafol (from Latin diabolus), colloquially diawl, is usually used for the Devil today, cythraul usually being used as a pejorative, e.g. "y cythraul bach!" '(you) little devil/rascal!'.

== Modern Druidic interpretation ==
Cythraul has been identified as a 'spirit of Chaos' by some modern Druids, an interpretation which dates back to Iolo Morganwg's Barddas. According to this view, "Cythraul" may be used to designate the same condition of primordial chaos or limitlessness which appears in, for example, Plato's Timaeus at 30A or Genesis 1. As the contemporary Druidic tradition springs from the Druid Revival, which began in the 18th century, and is unconnected with the ancient Druids except in viewing the latter as a source of inspiration, it is perfectly justified in this interpretation.

== In popular culture ==
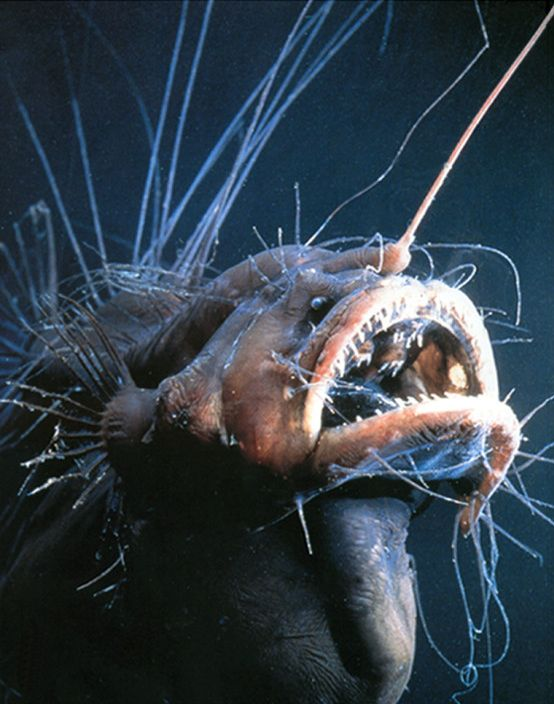
An Angler fish is referred to as "Cythraul of the sea" in Modern Welsh

The modern Welsh word for the Anglerfish is Cythraul y Môr ("Cythraul of the sea").

A creature named the Cythraul appears as one of the three Apocalypse Kings in the Skulduggery Pleasant fantasy novels by Irish author Derek Landy.
