= Welsh Mam =

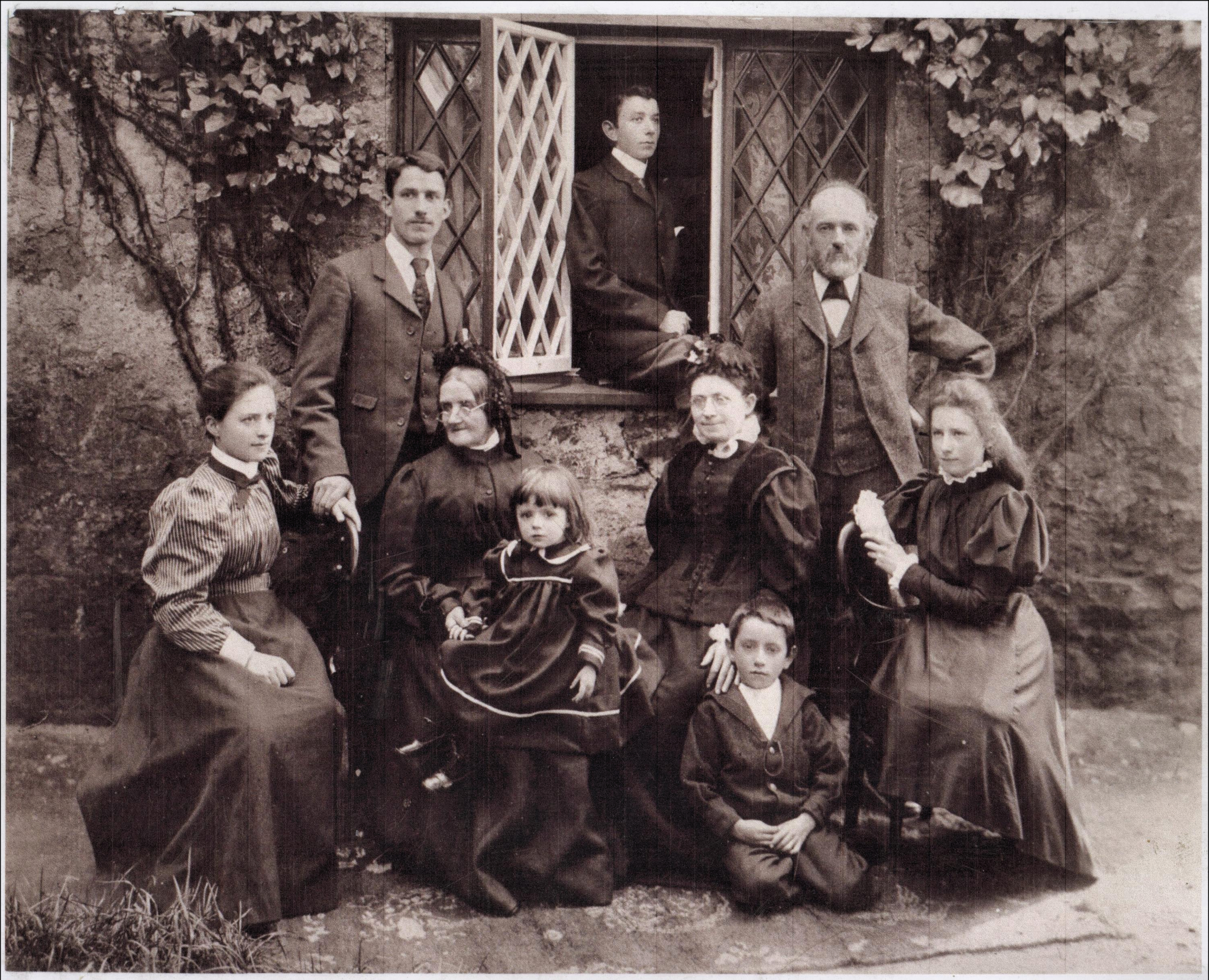
Angharad Jones Williams (1876–1932), seated second from left, with her family arranged around her for a portrait photograph from 1892. She was mother of Waldo Williams, Welsh poet.

The Welsh Mam (mam means "mother" in Welsh) was an archetypal image of Welsh married women, especially popular in 19th-century industrial South Wales, and depictions of that place and era.

The mythologised Welsh Mam was seen as a matriarch ruling her household, "the pivot, around which all family life revolved". In reality many Welsh women were economically dependent on male wage-earners, and suffered poverty and ill health exacerbated by regular childbearing.

== In the news ==
Women described as "Welsh mams" were seen in clashes with police and organizing family relief during the Welsh Miners Strike of 1984.

== Examples in popular culture ==
The Welsh mam was described as "hardworking, pious and clean, a mother to her sons and responsible for the home", in Richard Llewellyn's 1939 novel How Green Was My Valley. Actress Rachel Thomas often played Welsh mams in the 20th century, including roles in The Proud Valley (1940), How Green Was My Valley, Under Milk Wood, and the soap opera Pobol y Cwm. The character Dilys Price from Fireman Sam is considered a Welsh mam.

A 1997 World of Groggs clay figurine titled The Welsh Mam is in the collection of Amgueddfa Cymru – Museum Wales.

== See also ==
- Culture of Wales
- Welsh people
- Welsh literature
- History of Wales
- Gender role
