= Hywel Gwynfryn =

Welsh television and radio presenter

Hywel Gwynfryn (born 13 July 1942) is a Welsh television and radio personality and lyricist. He started working for the BBC in 1964 and joined BBC Radio Cymru at its inception, being the first voice heard on the new station.

== Career ==
Gwynfryn joined the BBC as a presenter in 1964 and in October 1968, he fronted Helo Sut Dach Chi?, the first dedicated Welsh language pop programme on the radio. It was a daring innovation because there was little vocal pop music in Welsh at the time and the show sometimes needed to be padded out with Anglo-American instrumentals. Soon however, Gwynfryn was receiving demo tapes from across Wales, and introduced a "patter" of Welsh language pop slang in the show which appealed to younger listeners. In 1970 he joined Children's Programming and worked on documentaries from different parts of the world.

Gwynfryn has been with the Welsh-language radio station Radio Cymru since its inception in 1977, fronting the flagship morning programme and presenting shows such as Hywel a Nia and Helo Bobol, as well as reporting annually from the Eisteddfod. Alongside his radio career, Gwynfryn has also presented television shows including Heddiw and Rhaglen Hywel Gwynfryn, and in 1972, with Huw Ceredig, started a weekly Welsh disco called Noson Barbarella in Cardiff. In 1990 he fronted On your bike, a series following the fortunes of Welsh families who had gone to live in other countries.

Gwynfryn has also written pantomimes, including Jiw Jiw Jeifin Jenkins, as well as a film for the Welsh-language television station S4C.

== Honours and awards ==
In the 1980s, Gwynfryn refused appointment as a Member of the Order of the British Empire (MBE), explaining that "when I got the offer I had just been made a fellow of Bangor University and had been given the green uniform by the Orsedd, so I felt that I had been recognized by my country." He added that he did not believe broadcasters and journalists should receive such honours.

In September 2023 it was announced that Gwynfryn would receive the Outstanding Contribution Award at the 2023 BAFTA Cymru Awards the following month.

== Personal life ==
Gwynfryn was born in Llangefni, Anglesey. He was educated at Ysgol Gyfun Llangefni and the Royal Welsh College of Music & Drama. As a student he was a roommate of Lynn Davies.

Gwynfryn and his wife Anja had five children, one of whom is musician and broadcaster H. Hawkline; Anja died on 6 October 2018 from cancer. He also has two children from his first marriage.
