= Bank holiday (disambiguation) =

Bank holiday chiefly refers to a public holiday in the UK and Ireland during which banking institutions are closed for business.

Bank holiday may also refer to:

== Bank holidays in other countries ==
- Public holidays in the Australian states of South Australia and Victoria, where all statutory holidays, their substitutes, and Saturdays are legally defined as bank holidays.
- Public holidays in Gibraltar are often referred to as "bank holidays" and used interchangeably, although strictly and legally there is a difference.
- Public holidays in Hong Kong, where the term "bank holiday" is used colloquially to refer to public holidays.
- Bank holidays in India.
- Public holidays in the Republic of Ireland, where "bank holiday" is a colloquial term.
- Federal holidays in the United States.

== Business and government ==
- The emergency holidays declared in the United States prior to the passage of the Emergency Banking Act during the Great Depression in 1933.
- A week-long emergency holiday decreed in March 1999 by the government of Ecuador during that country's 1998-1999 financial crisis, a measure that was followed by the total year-long freeze of all bank deposits.

== Art and entertainment ==
- The Bank Holidays, an Australian indie pop band
- Bank Holiday, a musical composition by Albert Ketèlbey
- Bank Holiday Records, record label owned by Lily Allen
- "Bank Holiday", a song by the Britpop band Blur on their album Parklife (1994)
- "Bank Holiday Monday" (song), a song by the Britrock band Stereophonics
- Bank Holiday (film), a 1938 British drama film

== See also ==
- Holiday (disambiguation)
- Public holiday
