= Proposed Saint David's Day bank holiday =

Proposed public holiday in Wales

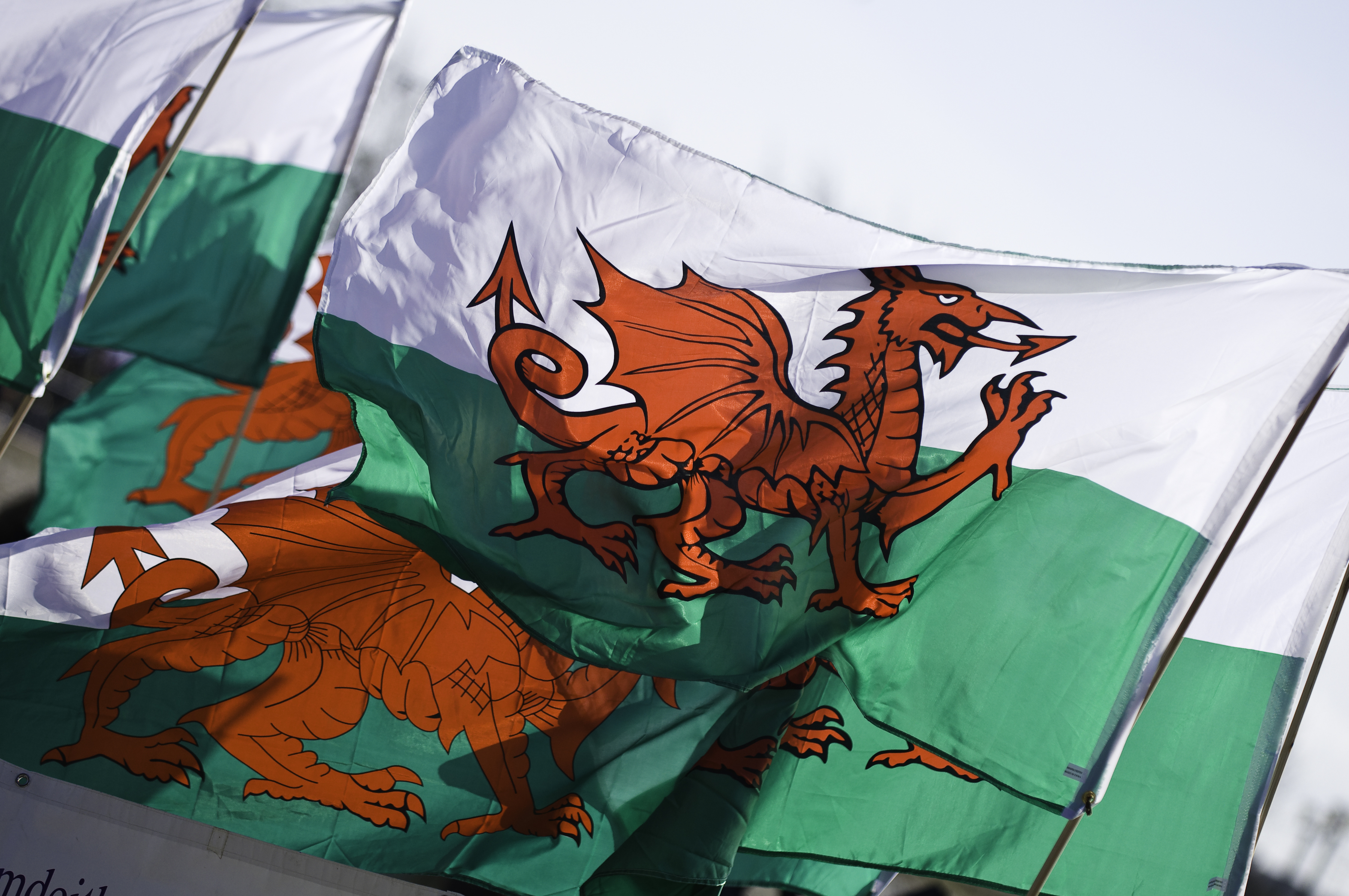
St David's day flying of the Welsh flag, Cardiff Bay 2009.

Saint David's Day (Welsh: Dydd Gŵyl Dewi (Sant)) is currently not a bank holiday in Wales. Some Welsh politicians have proposed that St David's Day, a celebration of Welsh identity, observed on 1 March, be designated as a public holiday.

Polls show the proposal to have majority public support in Wales and support of all political parties in the Senedd. The power to designate bank holidays is not devolved in Wales. The UK Government is responsible for designating public holidays in Wales and has refused proposals for either designating the day itself or devolving powers to the Welsh Government, which has expressed support for the proposal.

The UK Government had stated that designating the day would not be feasible due to the large numbers of commuters crossing the England–Wales border, as well as the economic impact of the proposal and no clear support from business groups. The economic costs of an additional bank holiday have been disputed, although not all sectors in the economy may be impacted equally. In response to the UK Government's refusal, some public bodies in Wales have unofficially designated the day to be a holiday for their staff. Supporters argue that it would have benefits to the economy, tourism and Wales' international appeal, as well as making Wales equal to Scotland and Northern Ireland which have their patron saint days be bank holidays.

Wales and England have only eight public holidays, compared to the European average of twelve, Scotland's nine and Northern Ireland's ten. The lower number in England and Wales has been argued as a reason for more bank holidays.

Jeremy Corbyn, Labour Party leader, alternatively proposed in 2017, that St David's Day, alongside the other three UK nations' patron saint days, become UK-wide holidays rather than only to their respective nations.

== Background ==
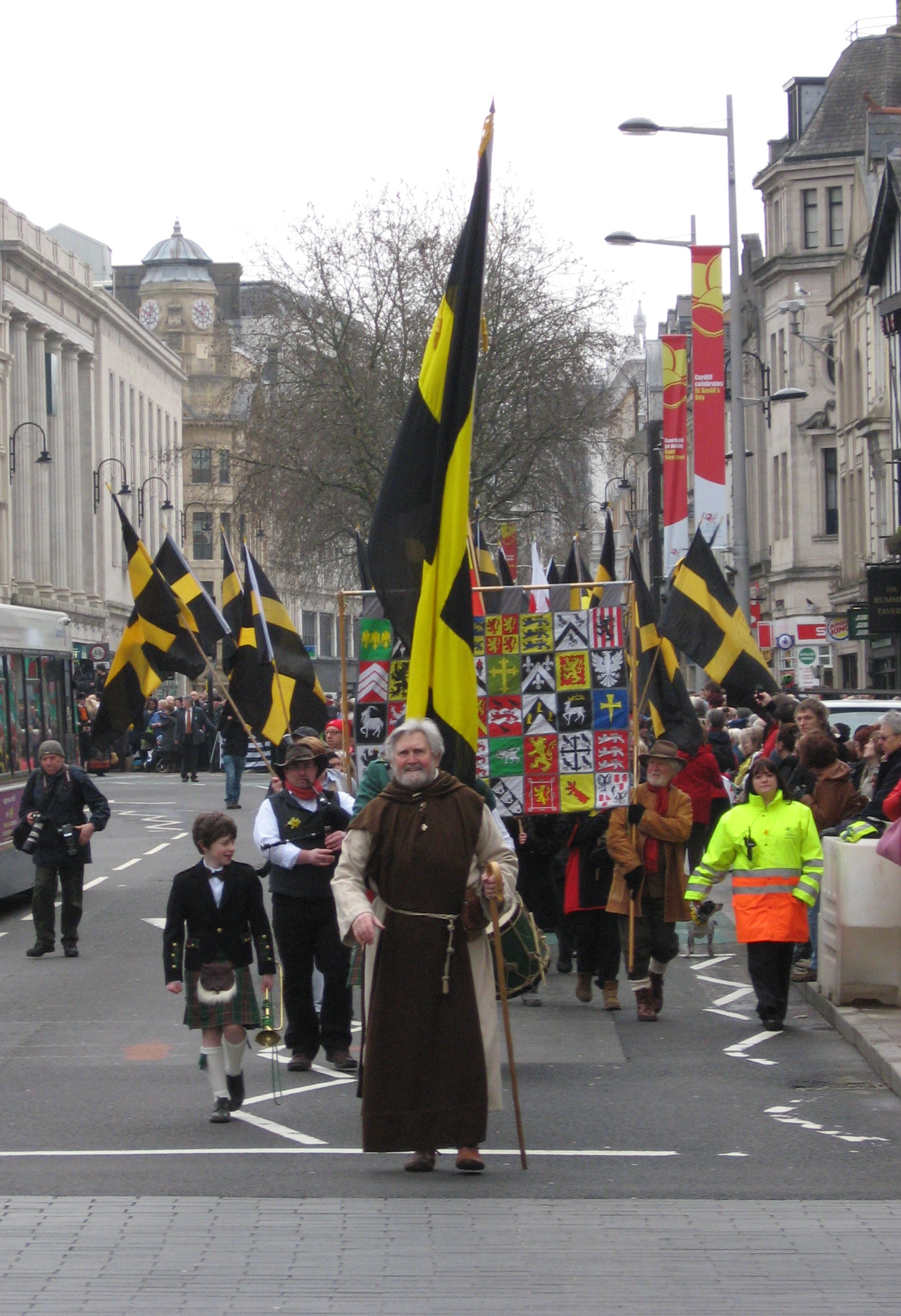
St David parade, Cardiff 2011.

Saint David's Day is the feast day of Saint David, the patron saint of Wales, and falls on 1 March, the date of Saint David's death in 589 AD. On the day, traditional festivities are held across Wales, with parades held in various towns and cities in the country.

St David's Day, like St George’s Day in England, is not a public holiday. However, St Patrick’s Day is an official bank holiday in Northern Ireland, and St Andrew's Day is an official bank holiday in Scotland. St Andrews Day was made a public holiday in Scotland in 2007, by the then Labour Scottish Government, which, unlike Wales, holds the power to designate public holidays. If defining the UK Government to be the responsible elected government for England, that would make Wales the only country in the UK unable to decide its own public holidays.

As of 2022, Wales and England have eight public holidays, Scotland and the Republic of Ireland has nine, Northern Ireland has ten, whereas the average in Europe is twelve annual holidays. In 2017, Labour had argued for more bank holidays, citing the lower amount of holidays in England and Wales compared to most other industrialised countries.

The benefits of an extra public holiday have been disputed, some sectors of the economy may benefit, whereas others suffer. Tourism hotspots such as Conwy and Pembrokeshire may benefit, but areas where there is less tourism may see little benefits. Measuring the impacts of a bank holiday are "very difficult". The opportunity to designate bank holidays including a St David's Day bank holiday has been suggested as one of the arguments in favour of Welsh independence.

Following proposals put forward by Labour in 2017 to establish St. David's Day alongside the other three patron saint days as UK-wide holidays, one study estimated a UK-wide bank holiday would cost £2 billion. Although costs would differ by sector, manufacturing would lose output, while services usually can transfer output to the next day. One government report estimated extra bank holidays could benefit the UK economy by £1 billion. However, estimating if there would be a negative impact on the economy for a bank holiday, has been described as difficult to answer, with estimated costs UK-wide-ranging from a loss of £3.6 billion to a benefit of £1 billion.

=== Legal position ===
Powers to designate public holidays in England and Wales are held by the UK Government's Department for Business, Energy and Industrial Strategy. Bank Holidays are designated by the UK-wide Banking and Financial Dealings Act 1971. The designation of St. Andrew's Day outside this act, and by the St Andrew's Day Bank Holiday (Scotland) Act 2007, gives it a different legal status, leaving it to the discretion of employers, although there are minimal differences in practice. There is no statutory right to a day off for workers on St Andrew's Day, however, they are usually given a day off, with most schools shut. The right to designate bank holidays has not been devolved to Wales, with both UK Houses of Parliament needing to agree on any new designation. The UK Government has resisted calls for a public holiday in Wales on 1 March.

On 23 November 2022, Christine Humphreys, Liberal Democrat Lords Spokesperson, introduced a bill to the House of Lords for the devolution of the power to designate bank holidays to Wales, which are already devolved to Scotland. Humphreys described the lack of a bank holiday as "deeply unjust", and that her bill was the "first step" towards devolving power to the Senedd and that the "Conservative [UK] Government must allow our Bill to pass".

== History ==
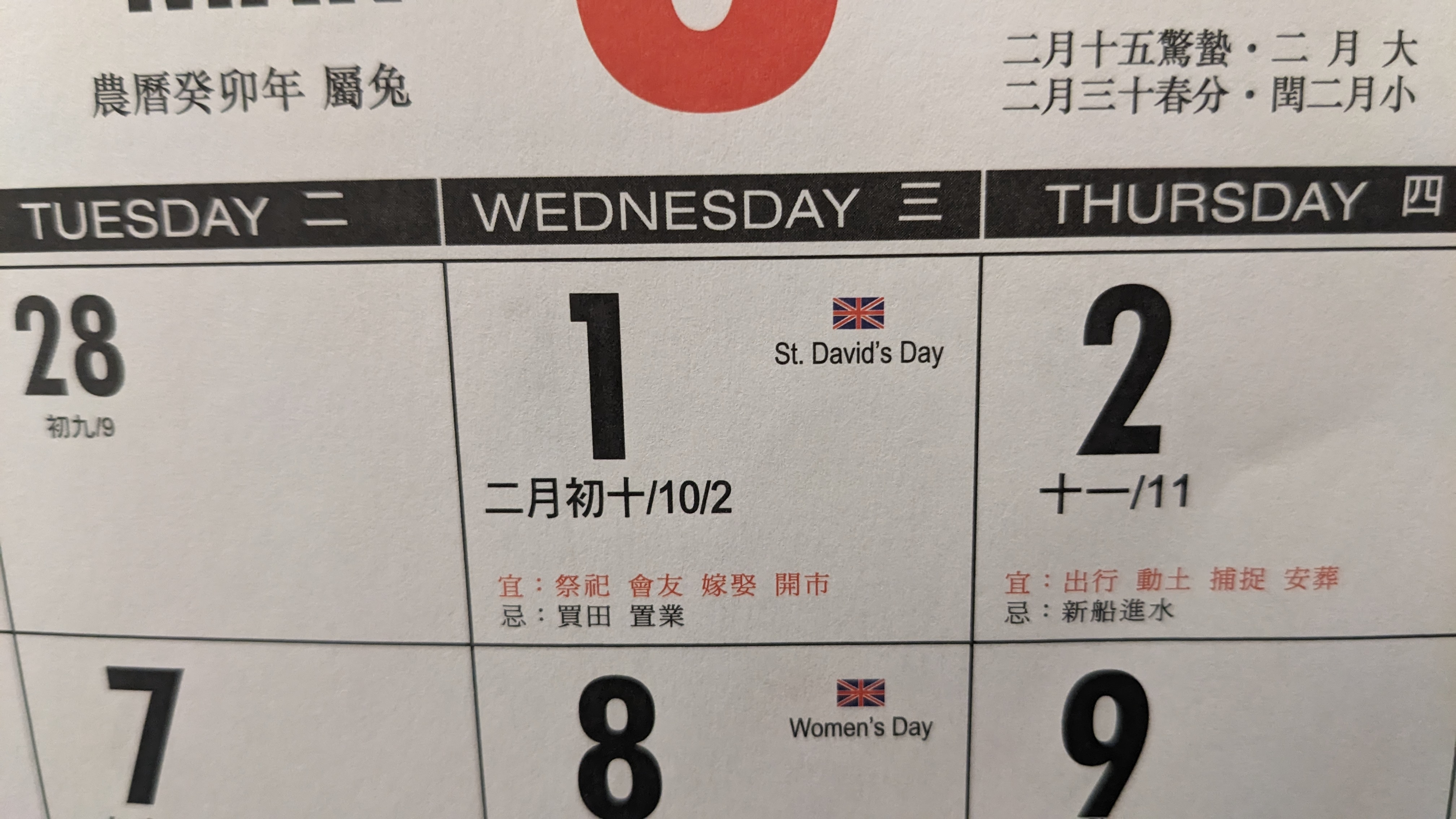
A 2023 calendar issued by the Dutch Amazing Oriental (東方行) supermarkets erroneously listing St. David's Day as a British bank holiday.

In 1997, following the 1997 United Kingdom general election which resulted in the Labour Party under Tony Blair winning, a St. David's Day bank holiday was proposed during a consultation exercise, with Secretary of State for Wales Ron Davies raising awareness of the proposal. Kim Howells, MP for Pontypridd and a Department for Education and Employment minister, stated his opposition in 1997, citing the £2.8 billion cost, impacts to teaching and increasing demands for similar days in England and Scotland (which at the time, Saint Andrew's Day was not a bank holiday). Howells later clarified in 2022, that he holds no "strong views" on the subject. Jack Straw, then Home Secretary also opposed the idea, citing he was confused over whether the proposal also extends to England.

In 2000, the then National Assembly for Wales (now Senedd) voted unanimously in support for the granting of St David's Day to be a bank holiday. The Labour UK government continued to oppose the idea, citing the economic impact.

In April 2001, hopes were initially raised for the proposal following The Sunday Times' claims that the Department of Trade and Industry (DTI), would announce a new bank holiday for 2003. With St David's Day hoped to be a consideration, alongside Trafalgar Day and Saint Andrew's Day. The DTI later dismissed the claims, stating there are no plans to introduce a new holiday in 2003, aside the day of the Golden Jubilee of Elizabeth II would be one in 2002.

In March 2002, Members of the Welsh Assembly, had debated the issue, although the assembly had no powers over the issue and needed the seek permission from the UK Government, with likely opposition to the proposal from business groups over the impact on decreased working hours.

In November 2002, the Labour UK Government rejected the Welsh Assembly Government's request for the bank holiday, citing the lack of support from businesses. Rhodri Morgan, First Minister of Wales, had been negotiating with Paul Murphy, then Welsh secretary, over the proposal, with Murphy later dismissing the proposal. Assembly members had previously rejected the counter-proposal that a St David's Day bank holiday replace an existing bank holiday. Plaid Cymru and the Welsh Liberal Democrats expressed their disappointment over the UK Government's dismissal.

A 2006 poll showed support for a St David's Day national bank holiday to be at 87%.

A 2007 petition gained more than 11,000 signatures, but was later rejected by the then Labour UK Government.

For the 2011 National Assembly for Wales election, the Welsh Conservatives, Plaid Cymru and Welsh Liberal Democrats included a commitment to the proposal in their manifestos.

In 2011, the UK Government consulted assembly members on the possibility of awarding the assembly the competence on the matter as part of a review into tourism strategy. The consultation was reported to have a wide range of opinions towards the proposal, leading to the proposal being dropped by the UK Government. Later requests from Carwyn Jones, First Minister of Wales, were rebuffed.

In 2013, the Assembly had voted in support of the Welsh Conservative motion progressing the proposal, but the Welsh Conservatives had criticised the Welsh Government for having a "lack of leadership" on the issue. The Welsh Government stated the issue was "not a devolved matter and the UK Government ha[d] previously rejected requests".

In 2014, the Welsh Government claimed that efforts to devolve the power to designate bank holidays to Wales were blocked by David Jones, the Welsh secretary.

In 2018, the UK Labour party under Jeremy Corbyn, campaigned for making St David's Day and St George's Day bank holidays, together with St Andrew's Day and St Patrick's Day, as part of a plan to have all four patron saint days become UK-wide bank holidays. The Conservatives argued the UK "would be on permanent holiday" under Corbyn.

In 2018, a YouGov poll conducted between October 2017 and March 2018, showed support (>49%) across the UK for patron saint days to become bank holidays in their respective UK nations. 58% of the Welsh sampled in the poll supported a Welsh bank holiday on 1 March, 17% a UK-wide holiday on 1 March, 20% opposed and 5% do not know.

In March 2021, a petition to the Senedd was rejected, as it concerned a proposal the Senedd or Welsh Government was not responsible for.

In October 2021, Gwynedd Council called on the UK Government to consider recognising St David's Day as a day of national celebration and to devolve powers over bank holidays. Both were rejected by the government.

In February 2022, an e-petition supporting the proposal exceeded 10,000 signatures.

In October 2022, then Welsh secretary, Robert Buckland stated Wales should get a St David's Day bank holiday if they ditch May Day, but it was not his decision to make. The UK Government stated they have no plans for a new bank holiday.

In February 2025, the Labour UK Government stated there are "no plans" to make it a bank holiday, despite the Labour Welsh Government wishing to do so.

=== Unofficial designation ===
Until 2015, Isle of Anglesey County Council staff celebrated St David's Day as a statutory/concessionary holiday following the council's establishment in 1996. The holiday's designation for council staff ended in 2015 following the formal adoption of a single status (job evaluation).

In 2018, a Powys County Council motion to make 1 March a bank holiday for staff, was voted down by 12 votes.

Carmarthenshire County Council has asked for an all-Wales approach to a St David's Day bank holiday.

In January 2022, Gwynedd Council voted to allow its staff to celebrate St David's Day with a paid day off work despite the UK government's refusal. Gwynedd councillors described the situation "like Oliver Twist", where they have to ask the UK government for a public holiday on Wales' national day, whereas an additional bank holiday was quickly created for the Queen's Platinum Jubilee in 2022. The council designated 1 March 2022, to be an "additional holiday day" for Council staff. A Gwynedd Council report stated that it would cost the council £200,000 every year. Teachers would have to continue to work on the day, as their contracts are not the council's responsibility. Criticism was placed on the decision, with some complaining it would be paid by Gwynedd tax payers for only council workers to be given a day off rather than all workers. Others expressed their wish it becomes a bank holiday across Wales.

On 27 January 2022, Caerphilly County Borough Council (CCBC) announced they would also lobby the Welsh and UK Governments for a St David's Day bank holiday. Following unanimous support from all council members to lobby for a St David's day bank holiday, Caerphilly Council leader Philippa Marsden suggested that all of Wales deserved a national holiday and that an all-Wales approach would be most appropriate "It would not be right or fair for those employees of CCBC alone to benefit from a public holiday, whilst their family members or neighbours employed elsewhere do not."

In February 2022, Neath Port Talbot County Borough Council, announced it was to look at a potential day off for its staff in an assembled report into the proposal.

Other councils in Wales announced they did not have plans to designate 1 March in 2022, as a holiday for staff.

By late February, thirteen social enterprises in Wales announced they would give their staff a day off on 1 March 2022. Including the charity People and Work in Cardiff and Pentre (Rhondda), saying that its decision reflected the changing face of Wales. The Snowdonia National Park Authority announced that "staff received the extra day of holiday last year [2021] as a reward for their hard work over the pandemic and we feel that the same should happen again this year [2022]".

=== Recent events ===
In June 2022, a Pembrokeshire County Council committee rejected a notice of motion to give council staff a local bank holiday on 1 March 2023. The committee broadly supported the idea of a bank holiday, but "felt it was up to the Welsh Government to continue its campaign". £250,000 was the estimate cost for the impact to education.

In July 2022, a motion had been put forward to Powys County Council by a Plaid Cymru councillor, suggesting that council staff be given the day-off on 1 March 2023. The proposal was estimated to cost £700,000, with more work and expense claims expected to increase the cost.

For 2023, Gwynedd Council, did not give a day-off to staff on 1 March 2023 as it did for 2022, with council services open and "business as usual" on St. David's Day. The 2022 decision was said to have polarised views, while most were supportive of the decision, there were criticisms of the impact the decision had on council finances, and the state of finances in 2023 were stated as a reason to not repeat the decision. The council criticised the UK Government's "insulting" response to calls for a bank holiday, and the situation was described by the council leader as "[going] cap in hand [...] [to] our masters in London".

== Support ==
Supporters for the designation, cite various reasons for a St David's Day bank holiday. They argue that Scotland and Northern Ireland having their patron saint bank holidays is a reason for Wales to have the same. Economically, they argue that the bank holiday would potentially lead to a boost to the Welsh economy, tourism, and increase the international appeal of Wales. Ben Cottam, the head of Wales' Federation of Small Businesses stated, "There is a benefit in capitalising on the brand on St David's Day. not just in tourism but in other areas such as e[x]porting food and drink for instance."

Culturally, supporters say the day would provide an opportunity to celebrate Wales as a whole, Welsh historical events, traditions, heritage, and the life of St David. It would also allow a better chance for parades to be organised for the day. Celebrating St David's Day as a public holiday in Wales is supported by all parties and members of the Senedd which include the Welsh Labour government, Plaid Cymru, the Welsh Liberal Democrats and the Welsh Conservatives.

Leader of the Welsh Liberal Democrats, Jane Dodds supports St David's Day as a bank holiday by saying; "This is the day we all come together to celebrate the huge tapestry of Welsh culture and remember our collective history. It is only right therefore that St David’s Day, Wales' national day, is made a public holiday just like St Andrew’s Day in Scotland and St Patrick’s Day in Ireland."

Non-party-political pro-independence movement group YesCymru have voiced their support for a St David's Day public holiday.

Andrew RT Davies, Welsh Conservative leader, has stated his support for the bank holiday, despite Conservatives in Westminster opposing the idea, and Davies criticising the lack of effective lobbying by the Labour Welsh Government.

A Senedd debate was held on 2 March 2022, following the UK Government's rejection of a St David's Day bank holiday. The Welsh Government said, "We've repeatedly asked the UK government for the Senedd to have the powers to make St David's Day a bank holiday, and it's disappointing to see these requests continue to be refused".

Some Welsh Conservative, Labour and Plaid Cymru politicians, namely Hefin David, John Griffiths, and Natasha Asghar, reiterated their support when contacted by the South Wales Argus, while Alun Davies blamed the (Westminster) Conservatives for the lack of one.

Robert Buckland, former Secretary of State for Wales, was sympathetic to proposals a bank holiday while in the role. Buckland had argued for scrapping the May Day bank holiday for a St David's day one, however it was not his decision to make.

== Opposition ==
=== UK Government ===
Powers to designate public holidays in Wales are held by the UK Government's Department for Business, Energy and Industrial Strategy. The UK Government has resisted calls for a public holiday in Wales every 1 March, and does not have plans to change arrangements. In December 2021, the government claimed that there were too many people commuting across the border between Wales and England, for the public holiday to be economically feasible. Minister for Small Business and MP for Sutton and Cheam, Paul Scully, said: "While we appreciate that the people of Wales want to celebrate their patron saint, more people work across the English/Welsh border than across the English/Scottish border [...] caus[ing] greater business disruption [...] if we had separate bank holidays".

The UK government also stated that Scotland and Northern Ireland have an extra holiday because of their "different histories, economic, social, cultural and legal systems".

Various officeholders of Secretary of State for Wales have dismissed requests for a bank holiday, including, Paul Murphy in 2002 and more recent secretaries. The government in 2002, argued that without support for the proposal from businesses, particularly the Confederation of British Industry, the government would not support legislation for a bank holiday.

Stephen Crabb, former Welsh secretary between 2014 and 2016, also expressed his opposition to the proposal, arguing schools have a "tremendous role" on portraying the St David's Day tradition and a sense of Welsh identity on the day, in which the proposal would have an impact on.

In 2022, Simon Hart, Conservative MP for Carmarthen West and South Pembrokeshire and Welsh Secretary, stated he is opposed to the idea. Hart's brief successor Robert Buckland, was however sympathetic to the proposals.

Buckland's successor David TC Davies, responding to the Welsh Affairs Committee, stated he is "on balance" against proposals for a St. David's Day bank holiday. Davies argued that such a holiday would lead to his children playing games rather than celebrate Welsh culture, with celebrations being more present in schools.

=== The Daily Mail ===
UK tabloid, the Daily Mail, voiced its criticisms of a St David's Day bank holiday in Wales, claiming taxpayers would have to pay for the bank holiday for Welsh nationalists, following reports that the Gwynedd Council decision to designate the day as an additional holiday would cost £200,000.

== Public opinion ==
=== Opinion poll ===
A 2006 poll showed support for a St David's Day national bank holiday to be at 87%. Support for the holiday remained high at 65% even when asked if another public holiday is lost to provide a slot for St David's Day. A 2018 YouGov poll showed 75% support for a St David's Day bank holiday (58% Wales-only holiday; 17% UK-wide holiday).

In 2018, a YouGov poll conducted between October 2017 and March 2018, showed wide support (49-67%) for all patron saint days to become a bank holiday in their respective countries, with Corbyn's proposal for four UK-wide holidays supported only by 13-24% of sampled populations of the four countries. 58% of the Welsh sampled in the poll supported a Welsh bank holiday on 1 March, 17% a UK-wide holiday on 1 March, 20% opposed and 5% do not know.

=== E-petition ===
In February 2022 over 10,000 people signed an e-petition for St David's Day to be designated a bank holiday, on the UK Parliament's e-petition site, meaning the UK government were obliged to respond (10,000 threshold).

The UK Government responded stating that there are no plans to make St David's Day a bank holiday due to its considerable cost to the economy. Although a previous admission stated that the cost of the one-off bank holiday for the Queen's Diamond Jubilee in 2012 cost £1.2 billion.

In response, journalist Will Hayward responded saying, "The UK government owes Wales an apology for its insulting St David's Day bank holiday petition response".
