= Public holidays in Ireland =

Public holidays in Ireland are established in statute law, and there are ten public holidays observed each year. Public holidays in Ireland (as in other countries) may commemorate a special day or other event, such as Saint Patrick's Day or Christmas Day. On public holidays, most businesses and schools close. Other services, for example, public transport, still operate but often with reduced schedules.

== List of public holidays ==
The ten public holidays in Ireland each year are:

Date	English name	Irish name	Notes
1 January	New Year's Day	Lá Caille or Lá Bliana Nua	Added to the public holidays statute in 1974. Most also take time off work for New Year's Eve (Oíche Chinn Bliana).
1 February or First Monday in February	Saint Brigid's Day / Imbolc	Lá Fhéile Bríde or Imbolc	First observed in 2023. First Monday of February, or on 1 February if it is a Friday. Co-celebration of the traditional Celtic festival of Imbolc with Saint Brigid's Day.
17 March	Saint Patrick's Day	Lá Fhéile Pádraig	National day. Became an official public holiday in Ireland in 1903.
Moveable Monday in March or April	Easter Monday	Luan Cásca	The day after Easter Sunday (Domhnach Cásca). Also coincides with the commemoration of the Easter Rising. The earliest date for Easter Monday is 23 March and the latest date is 26 April.
First Monday in May	May Day	Lá Bealtaine	First observed in 1994. Corresponds with the traditional festival of Bealtaine.
First Monday in June	June Holiday	Lá Saoire i mí an Mheithimh	First observed in 1973. Formerly observed as Whit Monday until 1973.
First Monday in August	August Holiday	Lá Saoire i mí Lúnasa	First observed in 1871. Corresponds with the traditional festival of Lúnasa.
Last Monday in October	October Holiday	Lá Saoire i mí Dheireadh Fómhair	First observed in 1977. Corresponds with Halloween and the traditional festival of Samhain.
25 December	Christmas Day	Lá Nollag	Most start Christmas celebrations on Christmas Eve (Oíche Nollag), including taking time off work.
26 December	Saint Stephen's Day	Lá Fhéile Stiofáin or Lá an Dreoilín	The day after Christmas, celebrating the feast day of Saint Stephen. Lá an Dreoilín means Day of the Wren.

Additionally, there are two bank holidays in Ireland each year:

Date	Notes
Moveable Friday in March or April	Good Friday (Aoine an Chéasta) is a bank holiday, but not a public holiday. Banks are closed on this day, alongside other businesses voluntarily. State schools are closed on this day as it falls during Easter break. The earliest date for Good Friday is 20 March and the latest date is 23 April.
27 December	27 December is a bank holiday, but not a public holiday. Banks remain closed on this day, while State schools are closed on this day as it falls during Christmas break. In line with public holidays, this bank holiday can be observed on 28 or 29 December, depending on the day it falls on, or if Christmas Day and/or Saint Stephen's Day fall on a weekend.

== Description ==
Public holidays in Ireland are often colloquially referred to as bank holidays. However, this is technically incorrect as bank holidays are not identical to public holidays, with banks additionally closed on Good Friday and 27 December.

Where a public holiday falls on a Saturday or a Sunday, or possibly coincides with another public holiday, it is generally observed (as a day off work) on the next available weekday, even though the public holiday itself does not move. Most employees are entitled to paid leave on public holidays. If an employee qualifies for public holiday benefit, they are entitled to one of the following: a paid day off on the public holiday, an additional day of annual leave, an additional day's pay; or a paid day off within a month of the public holiday.

There is no requirement for businesses to close on public holidays, for instance many shops will open but some may operate reduced hours.

== History ==
The United Kingdom Bank Holidays Act 1871 established the first Bank holidays in Ireland. The act designated four Bank holidays in Ireland:

- Easter Monday
- Whit Monday
- First Monday in August
- Saint Stephen's Day

As Good Friday and Christmas Day were traditional days of rest and Christian worship (as were Sundays), therefore it was felt unnecessary to include them in the act as they were already recognised as common law holidays.

In 1903, Saint Patrick's Day became an official public holiday in Ireland. This was due to the Bank Holiday (Ireland) Act 1903, an Act of Parliament introduced by the Irish MP James O'Mara.

In 1939, the Oireachtas passed the Holidays (Employees) Act 1939 which designated the public holidays as:

- Saint Patrick's Day
- Easter Monday
- Whit Monday
- First Monday in August
- Christmas Day
- Saint Stephen's Day

The Holidays (Employees) Act 1973 replaced the Whit Monday holiday with the first Monday in June. New Year's Day was added by Statutory instrument in 1974. The October Holiday was added in 1977. The first Monday in May (commonly known as May Day) was added in 1993 and first observed in 1994.

The Organisation of Working Time Act 1997, among other things, transposed European Union directives on working times into Irish law. Schedule 2 of the Act specifies the nine public holidays to which employees in Ireland are entitled to receive time off work, time in-lieu or holiday pay depending on the terms of their employment.

In 2022 only, Friday 18 March was a public holiday, to recognise the efforts of the country during the COVID-19 pandemic.

In 2023, Saint Brigid's Day (Imbolc) became a public holiday, to mark both the saint's feast day and the seasonal festival. It is observed on the first Monday of February, or on 1 February if it falls on a Friday. A government statement noted that it is the first Irish public holiday named after a woman, and "means that all four of the traditional Celtic seasonal festivals will now be public holidays".

=== Once-off public holidays ===
The power to introduce an additional public holiday is provided for in the Organisation of Working Time Act 1997 and the Minister for Enterprise, Tourism and Employment may introduce a new public holiday by regulation. To date, three once-off public holidays have been introduced under the Act via Statutory Instrument. These were:

Date	Occasion
31 December 1999	Special public holiday in recognition of the Millennium
14 September 2001	National day of mourning for the victims of the September 11 attacks
18 March 2022	Day of Remembrance and Recognition of people who lost their lives due to the COVID-19 pandemic

== School holidays ==
=== Primary schools ===
- In Ireland the academic year in primary schools lasts from late August to late June.
- The academic year is composed of 183 schooldays and schools are not open in July or August (though for flexibility school may open for the last two/three days of August).
- The first mid-term break is always the last week of October (also called the Halloween break).
- Most Catholic schools previously closed for the Feast of the Immaculate Conception on 8 December, however this has stopped.
- The Christmas break lasts from the last school day before 23 December to the first weekday after 6 January (17–21 days).
- The second mid-term break is a minimum of two days to a maximum of five days duration taken in the third week of February (also called the Shrove break).
- The Easter break consists of a week before Easter to the second Monday after Easter (10 school days or 16 days inclusive).
- In the last term holidays are flexible and are generally arranged around the public holidays in May and June.

=== Secondary schools ===
- In Ireland the academic year in secondary schools is composed of 167 school days and lasts from late August to early June.
- The first mid-term break begins on the last weekend before 31 October and lasts for one week.
- Many Catholic schools used to close for the Feast of the Immaculate Conception on 8 December but this however has stopped nationwide.
- The Christmas break lasts from the last school day before 23 December to the first weekday after 4 January (10 school days or 15–18 days inclusive).
- The second mid-term break begins on the last school day in the second week of February and lasts for one week.
- The Easter break consists of a week before Easter to the second Monday after Easter (10 school days or 16 days inclusive).
- The school year ends on the Friday before the June public holiday.
- The state examinations (the Junior and Leaving Certificate examinations) begin the Wednesday after the June Holiday.

== See also ==
- Irish calendar
- Public and bank holidays in Scotland
- Traditional festival days of Wales
- Public holidays in the United Kingdom for Northern Ireland
