= Wales Week in New York =

Festival celebrating Wales around St. David's Day

Wales Week USA is an annual festival held mainly in New York City around St David's Day, the national holiday of Wales (1 March). The week-long event celebrates modern Wales, focusing in particular on the arts, food and drink, sport, academia and business. The festival also aims to promote the Welsh in America and the contribution they have made to the country. In 2008, Wales Week will run from February 22 to March 1.

== History ==
Wales Week first started in 2003 and has grown in size gradually. Wales Week 2008 saw the expansion of the Festival beyond New York City, with events also held in Boston, LA and San Francisco.
