= Traditional festival days of Wales =

Days of festivities in Wales

Various traditions are practiced on certain days of the year in Wales both currently and historically, including festivities originating in Welsh, Celtic, English and Christian cultures.

== History ==
As recorded in the Laws of Hywel Dda, the three main holidays (gwyliau) of the medieval Welsh kingdoms were Christmas (Nadolig), Easter (Pasg), and Whitsuntide (Sulgwyn).

Other important holidays were the feasts of St Patrick (Gwyl Badric) on 17 March; St. Quiricus (Gwyl Giric) on 16 June; the Beheading of John the Baptist (called in Welsh Gwyl Ieuan y Moch – St. John of the Swine – as it was the day the pigs were turned out into the woods to forage through the winter) on 29 August; St Michael (Gwyl Fihangel) on 29 September; and the Calends of Winter (Calan Gaeaf) on 1 November, All Saints' Day (yr Holl Saint). A special drink called the "liquor of the Apostles" (gwirawd yr ebestyl) was brewed for and distributed on these saints' days.

== Modern celebrations calendar ==
| Date | Occasion | Type | Day traditions / Notes |
|---|---|---|---|
| 1 January | New Year's Day | Statutory | Calennig was a tradition where children carried a decorated apple, pierced with three sticks and decorated with a sprig of box and hazelnuts on new year's day. Children would sing a verse and were often gifted with money or food. Children in Wales are still given New Year's money on this day as part of the Calennig tradition. |
| 14 January | Hen Galan (Old New Year) | Informal | The Mari Lwyd ("Grey Mare") is a horse-figure that is carried from door to door by wassail-singing groups during Hen Galan (Old New Year) celebrations in some communities in Wales. |
| 25 January | Dydd Santes Dwynwen (St Dwynwen's Day) | Informal | Welsh day of love, equivalent to St. Valentine's Day. |
| 1 March | Saint David's Day | Observed (Proposed statutory) | The patron saint of Wales is St David (Welsh: Dewi Sant) and St. David's Day (Dydd Gŵyl Dewi Sant) is celebrated on 1 March. Some people argue it should be designated as a bank holiday. |
| Various | Shrove Tuesday | Observed | Shrove Tuesday, informally known as Pancake Day, is the eve of the Christian period of Lent, which was historically a fast. It is traditionally celebrated with the making of pancakes, because the perishables of flour, eggs and milk would be given up for the lent fast and so were consumed the day before. |
| Various | Mothering Sunday | Observed | Mothering Sunday, or Mid-Lent Sunday, and informally as Mother's Day, is a traditional celebration on the fourth Sunday of Lent, which was a break from the Lent fast. It is celebrated with various types of cakes and buns, especially Simnel cake. Flowers are also traditionally given to mothers. The name comes from The Collect for the day, Galatians 4:21–31, where Saint Paul refers to story of Hagar and Sarah, speaking of "Jerusalem … which is the mother of us all." |
| Various | Good Friday | Observed | On Good Friday (Welsh: Y Groglith), Christians mark the day of the crucifixion with church services. The traditional meal on Good Friday is fish. A former custom was making Christ’s bed. Children would gather river reeds, weave them into a Christ figure, fix it on a wooden cross, and then leave it in a quiet field or pasture to rest peacefully. |
| Various | Easter Sunday | Observed | On Easter Sunday, Christians celebrate their most important church festival, the resurrection of Christ, and children receive chocolate Easter eggs and engage in chocolate egg hunts. Hot cross buns are eaten and Easter greetings include "Happy Easter" in English or "Pasg Hapus" in Welsh. The traditional meal on Easter Sunday is roast lamb. |
| 16 September | Owain Glyndŵr Day | Informal | Although not a traditional holiday, many schools and organisations now commemorate the 16 September as a commemoration of Owain Glyndŵr, with festivals such as Gŵyl y Fflam (Festival of the flame) to celebrate it. In addition, towns with particular links to Glyndwr celebrate the day, including Corwen and Harlech. |
| 31 October – 1 November | Calan Gaeaf | Historically observed | The beginning of winter. It has Celtic origins as one of the Celtic fire festivals, which merged with the Christian tradition and with the November 5th commemoration. |
| 5 November | Guy Fawkes Night | Observed | Night of commemoration of the 1605 Gunpowder Plot on the Houses of Parliament in England. |
| 25 December | Christmas Day | Common Law | Christmas in Wales traditionally involved singing Plygain, toffee-making and torch processions. |
| 26 December | Boxing Day / Saint Stephen's Day | Statutory | Boxing Day or Saint Stephen's Day is known as Gŵyl San Steffan in Welsh. |
| 31 December | New Year's Eve | Observed | New year's eve in Wales includes attending pantomimes, theatre shows and parties. The Nos Galan road race is also held in Mountain Ash. |

== Festivals no longer widely celebrated ==
These are festivals that were once widely celebrated in Wales but are no longer so.

Gŵyl Fair y Canhwyllau, or Candlemas, usually on the 2 February, literally translates as "Mary's Festival of the Candles" marks the presentation of Jesus at the Temple. It is based upon the account of the presentation of Jesus in Luke 2:22–40. It falls on the 40th day (postpartum period) of and the conclusion of the Christmas–Epiphany season.

Whitsun, or the celebration of Pentecost, is a traditional Church festival that was observed with a statutory bank holiday in late May. The link with the formal Whitsun date (which moves with Easter) was broken and replaced by a late May bank holiday fixed to the end of the month.

Locally, each parish celebrated a Gŵyl Mabsant in commemoration of its native saint. This annual celebration developed from a dedication through prayer to a programme of recreational activities.

Calan Mai (or Calan Haf) is a May Day celebration on 1 May, marking the first day of summer, and one of the traditional fire festivals.

Gŵyl Ifan (St John's Day) on the 24 June is otherwise known as Midsummer's day.
