= Owain Glyndŵr Day =

Annual day of celebration in Wales

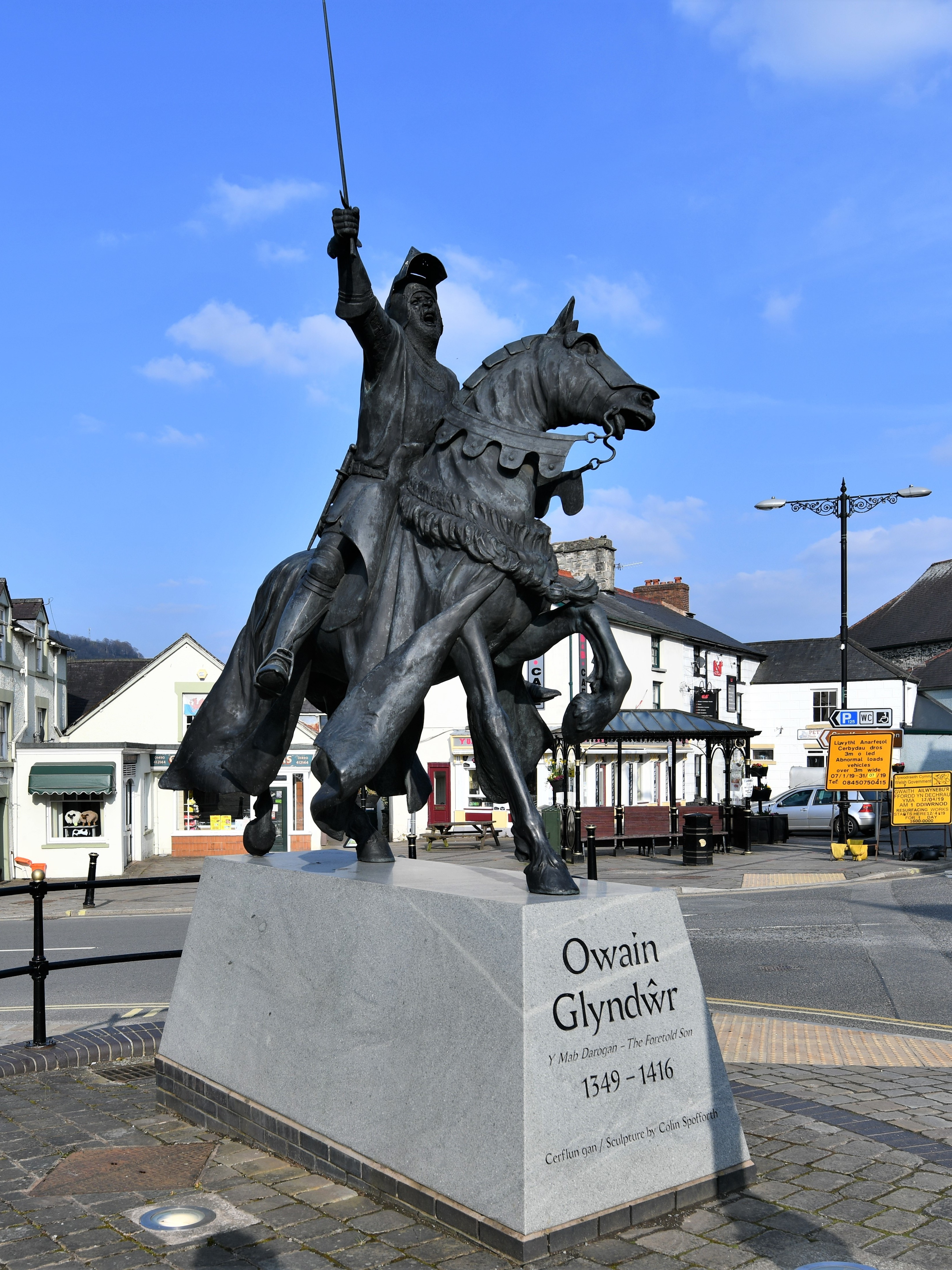
The equestrian statue of Owain Glyndŵr in Corwen, Denbighshire, the focal point of the town's Owain Glyndŵr Day celebrations

Owain Glyndŵr Day is held annually on 16 September in Wales, as a celebration of Owain Glyndŵr, the last native Prince of Wales and founder of the first Welsh parliament.

On 16 September every year, thousands in Wales celebrate the life and legacy of the "rebel" Prince of Wales.

Owain ap Gruffydd (c. 1359 – c. 1415), commonly known as Owain Glyndŵr was a Welsh leader who led a long-running war of independence to end English rule in Wales during the Late Middle Ages. He formed the first Welsh parliament, and he was the last native-born Welshman to hold the title Prince of Wales.

== Owain Glyndŵr ==
Banner of Owain Glyndŵr

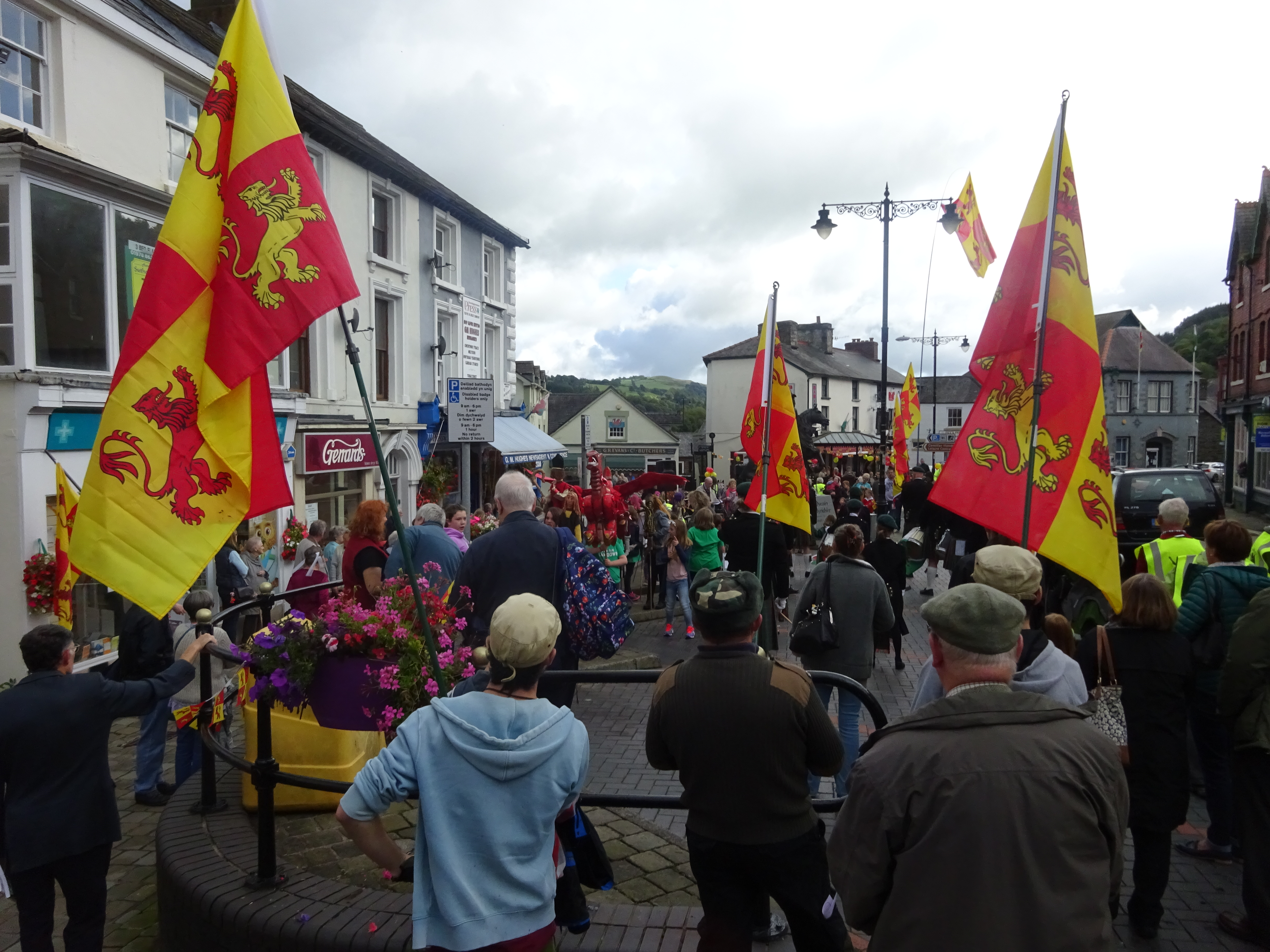
The Glyndwr Banner in use during Owain Glyndwr day celebrations in Corwen, 2017.

Owain Glyndŵr was a descendant of the Princes of Powys through his father Gruffudd Fychan II. Through his mother, Elen ferch Tomas ap Llywelyn, he was a descendant of the Princes of Deheubarth, also a descendant of Llywelyn the Great of the House of Aberffraw.

On 16 September 1400, Owain Glyndŵr proclaimed himself Prince of Wales. He instigated a 15-year Welsh Revolt against the rule of King Henry IV of England. His troops inflicted a series of defeats on the English forces and captured key castles across Wales, rapidly gaining control of most of the country. Glyndŵr received naval support from Scotland and Brittany and also received the support of King Charles VI of France. In 1403 a Welsh army including a French contingent, commanded by Owain Glyndŵr, his senior general Rhys Gethin and Cadwgan, Lord of Glyn Rhondda, defeated a large English invasion force reputedly led by King Henry IV himself at the Battle of Stalling Down in Glamorgan.

By 1404 four English military expeditions had been repelled and Owain solidified his control of Wales. He was officially crowned Prince of Wales (Welsh: Tywysog Cymru) and held a parliament at Machynlleth where he outlined his national programme for an independent Wales, which included plans such as building two national universities, re-introducing the traditional Welsh laws of Hywel Dda, and establishing an independent Welsh church. There were envoys from other countries including from France, Scotland and the Kingdom of León (in Spain).

Despite the initial success of the revolt, in 1407 the superior English resources and wealth began to turn the tide; by 1409 the English forces had reconquered most of Wales. Glyndŵr was cornered and besieged at Harlech Castle, but he managed to escape by disguising himself as an elderly man, slipping past the enemy at night. He retreated to the wilderness with a band of loyal supporters, continuing the war with guerrilla tactics throughout Wales and the English borderlands. The last documented sighting of him was in 1412 when he ambushed the King's men in Brecon, capturing a leading supporter of King Henry's. Owain twice ignored offers of a pardon from the new king Henry V of England. Despite the large rewards offered for his capture, Glyndŵr was never betrayed. His death was recorded by a former follower in the year 1415, at the age of approximately 56.

With his death, Owain acquired a mythical status along with Cadwaladr, Cynan and Arthur as a folk hero awaiting the call to return and liberate his people, Y Mab Darogan (The Foretold Son).

Glyndŵr is sometimes referred to as "the last Prince of Wales".

== Celebration ==
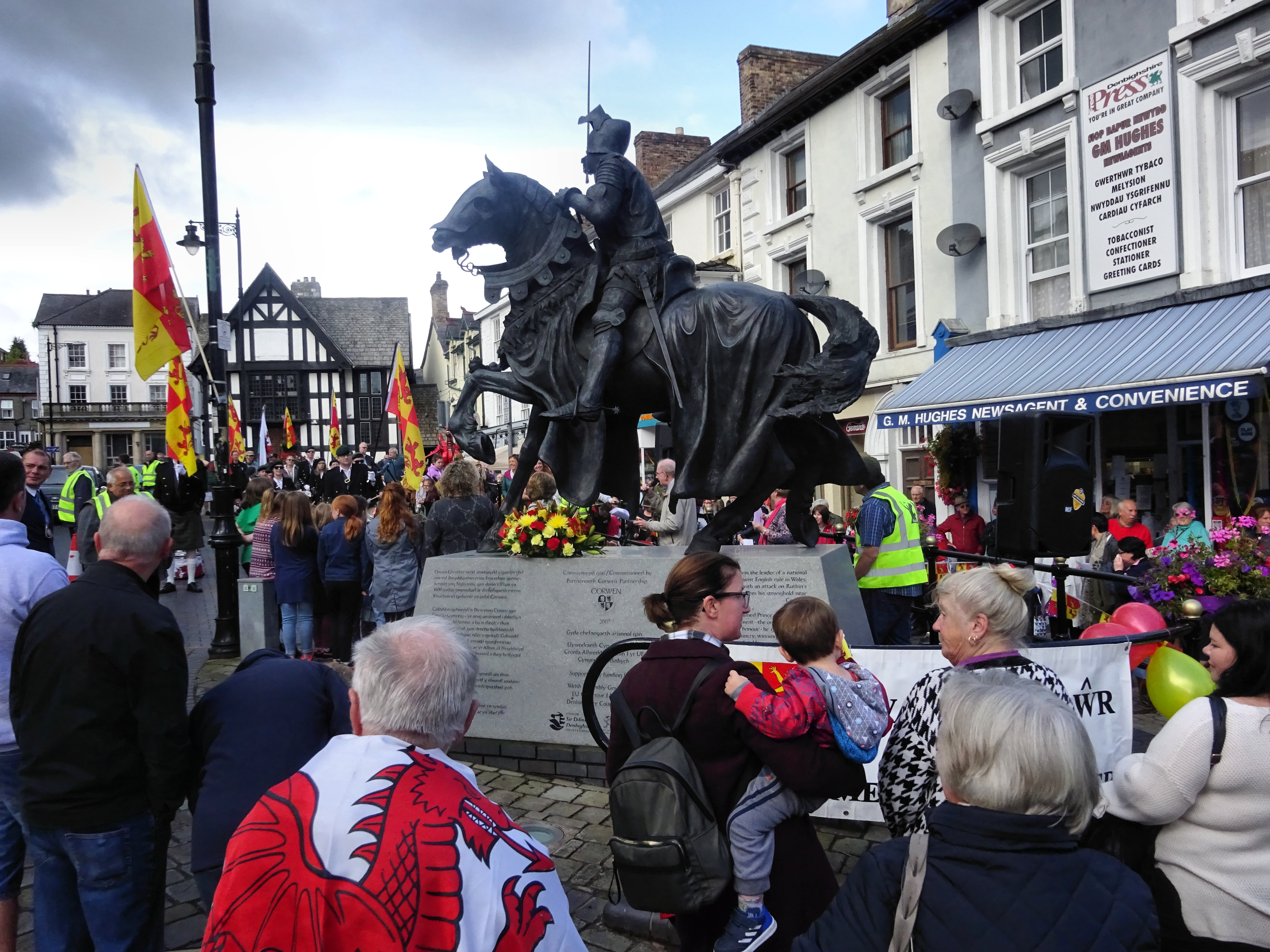
Owain Glyndwr Day celebrations, Corwen 2017.

=== 600th anniversary of the Glyndŵr Rising ===
On the 600th anniversary of Glyndŵr's Welsh Revolt in 2000, celebrations took place across Wales including Ruthin, where the uprising against the English had begun in 1400. The Welsh Tourist Board also encouraged flying of the Welsh flag from homes on the day. The publisher Y Lolfa printed a commemorative stamp as a protest against the Royal Mail's decision not to produce a stamp for the occasion. Cadw also opened Sycharth, Owain Glyndŵr's home in Glyndyfrdwy, to the public for the weekend.

=== Recent celebration ===
Many schools and organisations commemorate the day, and street parades such as Gŵyl y Fflam (Festival of the flame) are held to celebrate it.

For around 20 years, residents of the town of Corwen in Denbighshire have been celebrating its link to Owain Glyndŵr. Townspeople annually gather at the equestrian statue of Glyndŵr in Corwen town square on the date of his proclamation in 1400. The day's event includes a procession and wreath-laying ceremony and later a service held at the local church.

The day is also celebrated in Harlech, where an annual procession tales place.

Celebration also takes place in Machynlleth, the town where Glyndŵr held a national parliament of Wales before being crowned Prince of Wales and going into battle against the English to maintain Welsh independence. Children from Betws Gwerfil Goch and Gwyddelwern schools also make presentations, before the Cambrian Band marches onwards to the statue of Glyndŵr. A walking tour starts at Owain Glyndŵr's Parliament House. Caffi Alys in the town also hosts a night of music.

=== Councils ===
Powys County Council buildings fly Owain Glyndwr's flag in celebration on Owain Glyndwr day (as well as St David's Day).

== Calls for a national bank holiday ==
In 1999, Wales Heritage started a campaign for the day to be designated a national and public holiday.

In 2000, the campaign group Embassy called for the day to be made a national day in Wales for its 600th anniversary in 2001.

In 2012, A company in Newcastle Emlyn gave its workers the option of either taking the day off on Owain Glyndwr day or on a jubilee day of the British monarch, "In order to be inclusive, therefore, we have decided to give staff a choice of when they would like to take this extra holiday."

In 2021, Welsh politician, Dafydd Wigley called for an Owain Glyndŵr, saying, "any new national holiday should include 16 September as Owain Glyndŵr Day".

In 2021, Nia Jones of the Corwen Owain Glyndŵr Day Celebration Festival Committee said that "...certainly Owain Glyndŵr, it should be bank holiday day so that everyone can celebrate".

== Glyndŵr Day 2022 ==
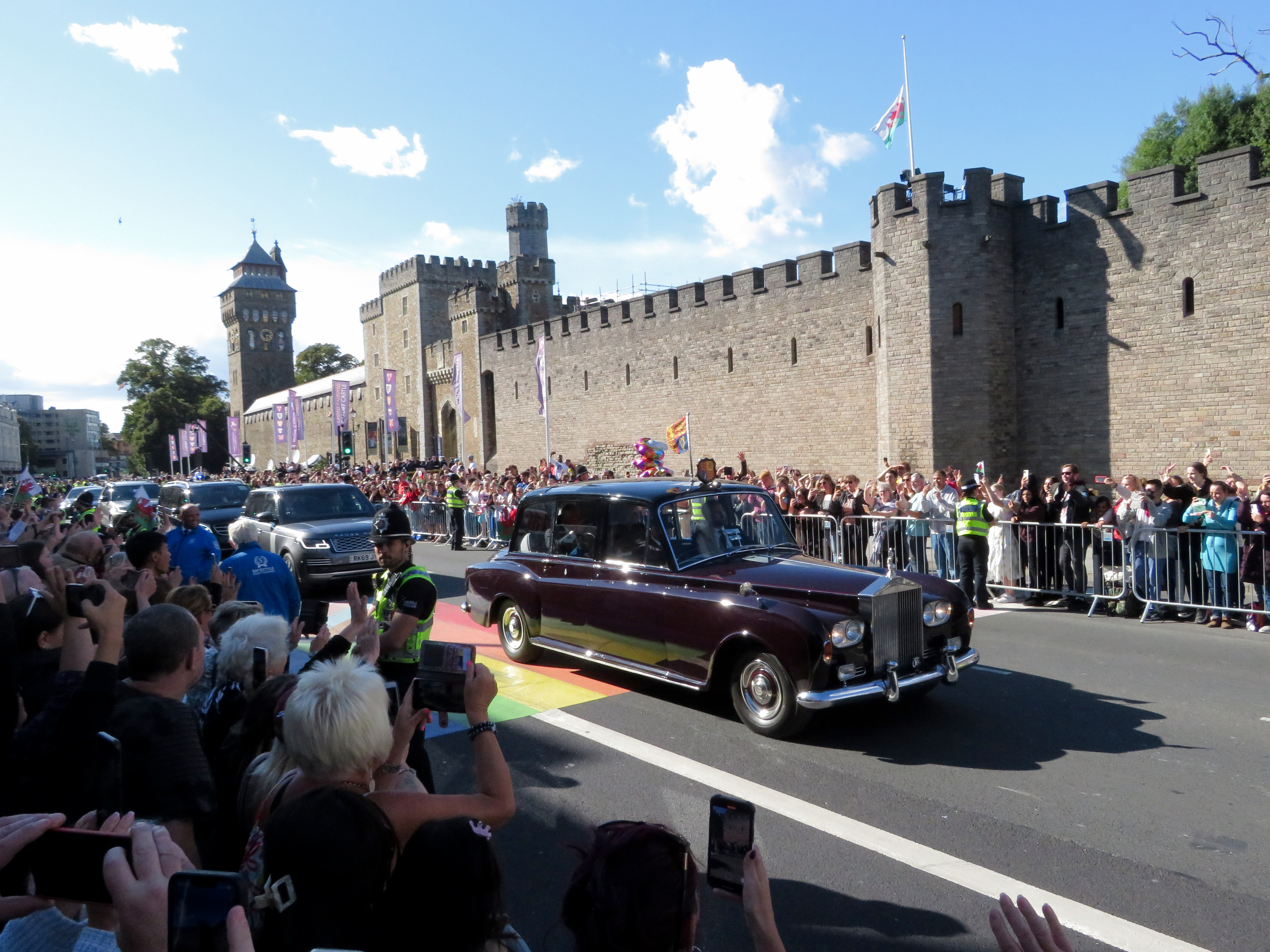
The car of King Charles III leaving Cardiff Castle during his visit on Glyndŵr Day 2022. The crowd included some who booed the king and others who took part in a silent protest.

The death of Queen Elizabeth II took place shortly before Glyndŵr Day 2022. As a consequence, organisers announced the cancellation of multiple events. Most notably, the parade and wreath-laying ceremony at Corwen was cancelled, although organisers decided to continue with the church service, lecture and community meal as planned. Cadw also announced that while its events at Machynlleth would go ahead, it would cancel events at Harlech Castle which caused a negative reaction from some people on social media.

It was also announced that King Charles III would make post-accession visits to Scotland, Northern Ireland and Wales, with the visit to Wales scheduled to take place on Glyndŵr Day causing fresh anger for many. As such, more than 25,000 people signed a petition calling for the British Royal family to end its use of the Prince of Wales title.

One notable reaction came from the actor and activist Michael Sheen, who posted a video on social media, questioning whether the palace knew the king’s visit clashed with Glyndŵr day, which he described as "insensitive to the point of insult" or if the visit was arranged in ignorance of it, which led Sheen to ask "what being Prince of Wales for so long actually meant if you were not aware of what that day means?" Sheen ended his video by quoting Lily Smalls, a character in Dylan Thomas's Under Milk Wood with what many interpreted as opposition to the continued use of the Prince of Wales title:

"Where you get that thing from, Willy?"
"Got it from my father, silly."
"Give it back then, love."

The day of the Royal visit was marked by a number of protests. On his arrival at Cardiff Castle sections of the crowd booed the King's car and waved the Banner of Owain Glyndŵr, while as the car left the castle, a number of groups including Labour for an Independent Wales took part in a silent protest against the monarchy.

== 2025 Celebrations ==
As part of the 2025 celebrations, the Culture Minister Jack Sargeant announced that Cadw would be offering free access for children under seventeen to a number of historic sites. The announcement followed a number of high-profile "heritage crimes" in Wales and a BBC report suggesting that "ignorance and lack of education" was a factor in the rise of vandalism.

== See also ==
- Saint David's Day
