= Public holidays in the Pitcairn Islands =

This is a list of holidays in the Pitcairn Islands.

2018
Date	English name
1 January	New Year's Day
23 January	Bounty Day
Friday before Easter Sunday (2018 date: 30 March)	Good Friday
Monday after Easter Sunday (2018 date: 2 April)	Easter Monday
Second Saturday in June	King's Birthday
25 December	Christmas Day
26 December	Boxing Day

== See also ==
- Public holidays in Australia
- Public holidays in the United Kingdom
