= Public and bank holidays in Scotland =

Overview of public holidays in Scotland, United Kingdom

Bank holidays in Scotland are determined under the Banking and Financial Dealings Act 1971 and the St Andrew's Day Bank Holiday (Scotland) Act 2007. Unlike the rest of the United Kingdom, most bank holidays are not recognised as statutory public holidays in Scotland, as most public holidays are determined by local authorities across Scotland. Some of these may be taken in lieu of statutory holidays, while others may be additional holidays, although many companies, including the Royal Mail, do not follow all the holidays listed below; and many swap between English and local holidays. Many large shops and supermarkets continue to operate normally during public holidays, especially since there are no restrictions such as Sunday trading rules in Scotland.

== Bank holidays ==
Since Easter 1996, the Scottish clearing banks have harmonised the days on which they are closed with those in England and Wales, and are therefore closed on Easter Monday and the last Monday in August (rather than the first). This has resulted in a number of local authorities creating a public holiday on Easter Monday. Previously Easter Monday had not been a public holiday in Scotland. There have been many protests about banks opening on 2 January since this decision was taken. This has resulted in many banks now providing only a limited service on 2 January, with most members of staff still entitled to the holiday.

Schedule 1 to the 1971 Act states that the following days are official bank holidays in Scotland:

Date	Name
1 January	New Year's Day
2 January	2nd January
variable	Good Friday
First Monday in May	Early May bank holiday
Last Monday in May	Spring bank holiday
First Monday in August	Summer bank holiday
30 November	St. Andrew's Day
25 December	Christmas Day
26 December	Boxing Day
Total	9

=== Notes ===
1. Certain bank branches in Edinburgh are open on the last Monday in August when the Edinburgh Festival is taking place
2. When the stated date falls on a Saturday or Sunday, the following Monday is normally designated a public holiday instead. When Christmas Day falls on a Saturday (and thus Boxing Day on a Sunday), the following Monday and Tuesday are normally designated public holidays instead
3. In 1995, the May Day holiday was moved to the second Monday in May – i.e., from 1 May to 8 May – to commemorate the 50th anniversary of VE Day
4. In 1999, an additional bank holiday was given on 31 December to enable people to prepare for the festivities to mark the arrival of the year 2000
5. In 2002, the Spring Holiday was moved to 4 June. This caused it to follow an extra bank holiday on 3 June, making a four-day weekend to celebrate the Golden Jubilee of Queen Elizabeth II
6. In 2011, a public holiday was given on 29 April to ensure most people would have a chance to celebrate the wedding of Prince William and Catherine Middleton, making a four-day weekend as May Day was on the following Monday
7. In 2012 the Spring Holiday was moved to 4 June. It was then followed by an extra holiday on 5 June, making a four-day weekend to celebrate the Diamond Jubilee of Queen Elizabeth II. Only Fife, Inverclyde and Scottish Borders were affected as they already take the first Monday in June as a public holiday. Most areas in Scotland did not have the four-day weekend and only had the Tuesday official holiday.
8. In 2022, there was a special holiday on Friday 3 June to celebrate the Platinum Jubilee of Elizabeth II. Therefore, to create a four-day weekend, the Spring Bank Holiday that would usually occur at the end of May was moved to Thursday 2 June. An additional public holiday was declared for Monday 19 September, the day of the state funeral of Queen Elizabeth II.
9. Monday 8 May 2023 was an additional public holiday to commemorate the coronation of King Charles III and Queen Camilla.

The holiday on 1 January (or 2 January if 1 January is Sunday) is statutory. If New Year's Day is Saturday a substitute holiday is given on 4 January by royal proclamation. 2 January is given by royal proclamation, with a substitute holiday on 4 January if it is Saturday and 3 January if it is Sunday or Monday.

The St Andrew's Day Bank Holiday (Scotland) Act 2007, passed by the Scottish Parliament on 29 November 2006, added St Andrew's Day (30 November), or the following Monday should 30 November fall on a weekend.

== Special days and substitute bank holidays ==
Section 1 of the 1971 Act also provides that special days may be appointed as bank holidays (either additional or in place of bank holidays which fall on a Saturday or Sunday) subject to royal proclamation each year. These include Boxing Day, which has been an additional bank holiday in Scotland since 1974, and the last Monday in May, which has been a bank holiday since 1978.

Section 1 of the 1971 Act also enables substitute bank holidays to be appointed by royal proclamation. Substitute days are customarily appointed for all UK bank holidays which fall on a Saturday or Sunday. Where any of the dates fall on a Sunday, the Act substitutes the following Monday for that date. If any fall on a Saturday (or if Boxing Day falls on a Saturday or Sunday), the royal proclamation includes substitute days for these days.

== Public holidays ==
Date	Name	Major towns/cities (not an exhaustive list)
1 January	New Year's Day	all
2 January	2nd January	all
Wednesday after last Tuesday in January	Day after Up Helly Aa fire festival	Shetland
First Monday in February	Winter Holiday	Inverness
First Monday in March	Winter Holiday	Inverness
Last Monday in March	Winter Holiday	Lochaber
Easter holiday (variable)	Good Friday	Aberdeen, Ayr, Dumfries and Galloway, East Dunbartonshire, Edinburgh, Falkirk, Inverclyde, Kilmarnock, Paisley, Stirling, South Lanarkshire, West Dunbartonshire
Easter holiday (variable)	Easter Monday	Ayr, Edinburgh, Falkirk, East Dunbartonshire, Glasgow, Inverclyde, Kilmarnock, North Lanarkshire, Paisley, Stirling, South Lanarkshire, West Dunbartonshire
First Monday in April	Spring Holiday	Carnoustie and Monifieth area, Dundee, Fife, Scottish Borders, Inverness, Perth,
Second Monday in April	Spring Holiday	Angus, except Carnoustie and Monifieth area, Elgin
Third Monday in April, or preceding week if would otherwise coincide with Easter Monday	Spring Holiday	Edinburgh
Monday in April; date varies from year to year	Spring Holiday	Aberdeen
Last Monday in April	Spring Holiday	Inverclyde
First Monday in May	Labour Day or Early May Bank Holiday	all
Tuesday after first Monday in May	Victoria Day (*)/Spring Holiday	Clydebank, Stirling
Last Monday strictly before 24 May	Victoria Day (*)/Spring Holiday	Edinburgh*
Fourth Monday in May	Victoria Day (*)/Spring Holiday	Perth*
Last Monday in May	Victoria Day (*)/Spring Holiday	Ayr, Dundee*, East Dunbartonshire, Glasgow, North Lanarkshire, Paisley*, South Lanarkshire
First Monday in June	Victoria Day (*)/Spring Holiday	Galashiels, Inverclyde, Fife
Friday and Saturday after first Monday in June	Common Riding	Hawick
Tuesday after second Thursday in June	Linlithgow Marches	Linlithgow
Second Thursday in June	Lanimer Day	Lanark area only
Last Monday in June	Fair Holiday	Elgin
Last Friday in June	Fair Holiday	Bo'ness
First Monday in July	Fair Holiday	Falkirk, Inverness
First Friday in July	Braw Lads Gathering	Galashiels
Second Monday in July	Fair Holiday	Aberdeen
Third Monday in July	Fair Holiday	Arbroath, Fife, East Dunbartonshire, Glasgow, North Lanarkshire, South Lanarkshire except Lanark
Fourth Friday in July	Fair Holiday	Scottish Borders
Last Monday in July	Fair Holiday	Dundee
First Monday in August	Fair Holiday	Paisley
First Monday in September	Late Summer Holiday	Elgin, Inverclyde
Second Monday in September	Battle of Stirling Bridge	Falkirk, Perth, Stirling
Third Friday in September	Ayr Gold Cup	Ayr, Kilmarnock
Monday after Third Friday in September	Ayr Gold Cup	Ayr, Kilmarnock
Third Monday in September	Autumn Holiday	Edinburgh
Last Monday in September	Autumn Holiday	Aberdeen, Angus except Carnoustie and Monifieth area, East Dunbartonshire, Glasgow, North Lanarkshire, Paisley, South Lanarkshire, West Dunbartonshire
First Monday in October	Autumn Holiday	Carnoustie and Monifieth area, Dundee, Inverness, Perth
Second Monday in October	Autumn Holiday	Scottish Borders
Third Monday in October	Autumn Holiday	Elgin, Fife
First Monday in November	Samhain holiday	Inverness
30 November	St. Andrew's Day To be taken in lieu of one of the other statutory holidays at discretion of individual companies/authorities.	an official holiday in Angus, Fife, Scottish Borders
25 December	Christmas Day	All
26 December	Boxing Day	All

== Sources ==
- Scottish Government article on St Andrew's Day Bank Holiday (Scotland) Act 2007

== See also ==
- Bank holiday
- Traditional festival days of Wales
- Public holidays in the Republic of Ireland
- Public holidays in the United Kingdom
