= List of acts of the Scottish Parliament from 2007 =

This is a list of acts of the Scottish Parliament passed in 2007. Acts of the Scottish Parliament are enacted by the Scottish Parliament, which has legislative authority over devolved matters in relation to Scotland under the authority of the Scotland Act 1998. Acts are cited by calendar year, in the same fashion as acts of Parliament of the United Kingdom. Each act passed in a respective year is numbered consecutively with Arabic numerals, following the prefix "asp".

19 acts of the Scottish Parliament were passed in 2007.

indicates that an act has been transcribed on Wikisource, indicates that an act is available to view at legislation.gov.uk, and indicates the location of the original act in the Parliamentary Archives.

== Acts of the Scottish Parliament ==
Short title	Citation	Royal assent
Long title
Glasgow Airport Rail Link Act 2007	2007 asp 1	15 January 2007
An Act of the Scottish Parliament to authorise the construction of a railway from a point east of Paisley St James Station to Glasgow Airport and to make improvements in the existing railway between Paisley St James Station and Glasgow Central Station; and for connected purposes.
St Andrew's Day Bank Holiday (Scotland) Act 2007	2007 asp 2	15 January 2007
An Act of the Scottish Parliament to establish a bank holiday for St Andrew's Day.
Bankruptcy and Diligence etc. (Scotland) Act 2007	2007 asp 3	15 January 2007
An Act of the Scottish Parliament to amend the law of sequestration and personal insolvency; to amend the law about floating charges; to establish a Scottish Civil Enforcement Commission and replace officers of court with judicial officers; to amend the law of diligence; and for connected purposes.
Adoption and Children (Scotland) Act 2007	2007 asp 4	15 January 2007
An Act of the Scottish Parliament to restate and amend the law relating to adoption; to make other provision in relation to the care of children; to enable provision to be made in relation to allowances in respect of certain children; and for connected purposes.
Legal Profession and Legal Aid (Scotland) Act 2007	2007 asp 5	19 January 2007
An Act of the Scottish Parliament to establish the Scottish Legal Complaints Commission; to make provision as regards complaints against members of the legal profession in Scotland and other matters concerning the regulation of that profession; to make provision in connection with the administration of the Scottish Legal Aid Fund, including a register of advice organisations in connection with advice and assistance; and for connected purposes.
Criminal Proceedings etc. (Reform) (Scotland) Act 2007	2007 asp 6	22 February 2007
An Act of the Scottish Parliament to make provision as to bail in criminal proceedings; to reform certain aspects of summary criminal procedure; to make provision in relation to solemn criminal procedure; to make provision as to maximum penalties in the summary criminal courts; to make provision for the purpose of compensation orders in favour of victims of offences; to make provision for and in relation to alternatives to prosecution; to make provision as to enforcement of financial penalties for offences; to make provision establishing the JP court and for disestablishing the district court; to provide for the inspection of the Crown Office and Procurator Fiscal Service; and for connected purposes.
Crofting Reform etc. Act 2007	2007 asp 7	1 March 2007
An Act of the Scottish Parliament to make further provision as regards crofting and as regards the Scottish Land Court; and for connected purposes.
Transport and Works (Scotland) Act 2007	2007 asp 8	14 March 2007
An Act of the Scottish Parliament to provide for the making of orders related to, or to matters connected with, the construction or operation of railways, tramways, other guided transport systems, trolley vehicle systems and inland waterways; to make changes to procedures applicable to orders and schemes under the Roads (Scotland) Act 1984, (Note: Roads (Scotland) Act 1984 (c. 54)) the Harbours Act 1964 (Note: Harbours Act 1964 (c. 40)) and the Pilotage Act 1987; (Note: Pilotage Act 1987 (c. 21)) to make further provision as regards grants for purposes relating to transport; and for connected purposes.
Budget (Scotland) Act 2007	2007 asp 9	20 March 2007
An Act of the Scottish Parliament to make provision, for financial year 2007/08, for the use of resources by the Scottish Administration and certain bodies whose expenditure is payable out of the Scottish Consolidated Fund, for authorising the payment of sums out of the Fund and for the maximum amounts of borrowing by certain statutory bodies; to make provision, for financial year 2008/09, for authorising the payment of sums out of the Fund on a temporary basis; and for connected purposes.
Adult Support and Protection (Scotland) Act 2007	2007 asp 10	21 March 2007
An Act of the Scottish Parliament to make provision for the purposes of protecting adults from harm; to require the establishment of committees with functions relating to the safeguarding of adults who are at risk of harm; to amend the law relating to incapable adults; to remove an individual's liability for expenses incurred by councils in performing certain functions in relation to the individual's spouse or child; to allow the Scottish Ministers to delegate their functions relating to councils' duty to pay sums for the purposes of securing community care services; to make provision entitling a council to recover expenses incurred in providing social services to persons who are not ordinarily resident in the council's area; to allow the Public Guardian to intervene in court proceedings; to amend the law relating to mentally disordered persons; and for connected purposes.
Prostitution (Public Places) (Scotland) Act 2007	2007 asp 11	5 April 2007
An Act of the Scottish Parliament to make new provision in relation to prostitution in public places; and for connected purposes.
Aquaculture and Fisheries (Scotland) Act 2007	2007 asp 12	5 April 2007
An Act of the Scottish Parliament to make provision in relation to fish farms and shellfish farms; in relation to the parasite Gyrodactylus salaris; in relation to salmon and freshwater fisheries and sea fisheries; in relation to payments connected with aquaculture and fisheries; and for connected purposes.
Christmas Day and New Year's Day Trading (Scotland) Act 2007	2007 asp 13	13 April 2007
An Act of the Scottish Parliament to prohibit the opening of large shops on Christmas Day and to confer power to prohibit the opening of such shops on New Year's Day for the purpose of retail trading.
Protection of Vulnerable Groups (Scotland) Act 2007	2007 asp 14	18 April 2007
An Act of the Scottish Parliament to bar certain individuals from working with children or certain adults; to require the Scottish Ministers to keep lists of those individuals; to make further provision in relation to those lists; to establish a scheme under which information about individuals working or seeking to work with children or certain adults is collated and disclosed; to amend Part 5 of the Police Act 1997; (Note: Police Act 1997 (c. 50)) to amend the meaning of school care accommodation service in the Regulation of Care (Scotland) Act 2001; (Note: Regulation of Care (Scotland) Act 2001 (asp 8)) and for connected purposes.
Schools (Health Promotion and Nutrition) (Scotland) Act 2007	2007 asp 15	19 April 2007
An Act of the Scottish Parliament to make provision about the promotion of health in certain schools and certain school hostels; and to amend the law in relation to the provision of food and drink for certain pupils.
Edinburgh Airport Rail Link Act 2007	2007 asp 16	19 April 2007
An Act of the Scottish Parliament to authorise the construction of new railways to link Edinburgh Airport to the national rail network; to make provision concerning planning agreements and developer contributions relating to the railway; and for connected purposes.
Custodial Sentences and Weapons (Scotland) Act 2007	2007 asp 17	19 April 2007
An Act of the Scottish Parliament to restate and amend the law relating to the confinement and release of prisoners; to make provision relating to the control of weapons; and for connected purposes.
Rights of Relatives to Damages (Mesothelioma) (Scotland) Act 2007	2007 asp 18	26 April 2007
An Act of the Scottish Parliament to amend the law concerning the right of certain relatives of a deceased person to claim damages in respect of the death of the deceased from mesothelioma.
Airdrie-Bathgate Railway and Linked Improvements Act 2007	2007 asp 19	8 May 2007
An Act of the Scottish Parliament to authorise the construction of new railways between Drumgelloch and Bathgate, including new stations at Caldercruix and Armadale; to authorise the use of land for relocated stations at Drumgelloch and Bathgate; to authorise related improvements to the existing railways between Airdrie and Drumgelloch and Bathgate and Edinburgh; to regularise the operation of certain enactments relating to the existing railway affected by the works so authorised; and for connected purposes.

== See also ==
- List of acts of the Scottish Parliament
