= Public holidays in the United Kingdom =

In the United Kingdom, public holidays are days on which most businesses and non-essential services are closed. Many retail businesses (especially the larger ones) do open on some of the public holidays. There are restrictions on trading on Sundays, Easter and Christmas Day in England and Wales and on New Year's Day and Christmas Day in Scotland. Public holidays defined by statute are called "bank holidays", but this term can also be used to include common law holidays, which are held by convention. The term "public holidays" can refer exclusively to common law holidays.

There is no automatic right to paid time off on these days, or any right to a holiday at all, but banks close and the majority of the working population is granted time off work or extra pay for working on these days, depending on their contracts. Before 1980, collective agreements widely included public holidays as part of a standard entitlement to time off. Schedule 11 of the Employment Protection Act 1975 enabled mandatory extension of collective agreements across sectors, but this was repealed with effect from 1980, and the Fair Wages Resolution 1946 (affecting public sector contracts) was repealed with effect from 1983. This meant there was no effective legal mechanism for holidays until the Working Time Regulations 1998, based on the Working Time Directive restored 20 and then 28 days paid holidays - however employers do not need to grant paid holidays on public holiday days.

There are eight bank holidays a year in England and Wales, nine in Scotland and ten in Northern Ireland. Additional days have been allocated for special events, such as royal weddings, coronations, and jubilees. There are seven bank holidays common to all jurisdictions: New Year's Day, Good Friday, the early May bank holiday (May Day), the Spring bank holiday, the Summer bank holiday, Christmas Day, and Boxing Day. Easter Monday is a bank holiday in England, Wales, and Northern Ireland, but not in Scotland. In Northern Ireland, Saint Patrick's Day and Orangemen's Day are also bank holidays. In Scotland, 2 January and St Andrew's Day are bank holidays. The Summer bank holiday varies according to jurisdiction: in Scotland, it is on the first Monday in August, and in the rest of the United Kingdom, it is on the last Monday in August.

== History ==
In England, Wales and Northern Ireland, Good Friday and Christmas Day are common law holidays, having been customary holidays since time immemorial.

The first official bank holidays were named in the Bank Holidays Act 1871, introduced by Liberal politician and banker Sir John Lubbock. Under the Act, "no person was compelled to make any payment or to do any act upon a bank holiday which he would not be compelled to do or make on Christmas Day or Good Friday, and the making of a payment or the doing of an act on the following day was equivalent to doing it on the holiday". People were so grateful that some called the first bank holidays St Lubbock's Days for a while.

England, Wales and Ireland
Bank holidays 1871
Easter Monday
Whit Monday
First Monday in August
26 December (or 27th if 26th is a Sunday)

Scotland
Bank holidays 1871
New Year's Day
Good Friday
First Monday in May
First Monday in August
Christmas Day

The Act did not include Good Friday and Christmas Day as bank holidays in England, Wales, or Ireland because they were already recognised as common law holidays.

In 1903, the Bank Holiday (Ireland) Act added 17 March, Saint Patrick's Day, as a bank holiday in Ireland only. New Year's Day did not become a bank holiday in England, Wales and Northern Ireland until 1 January 1974. Boxing Day did not become a bank holiday in Scotland until 1974.

Starting in 1965, experimentally, the August Bank Holiday weekend was observed at the end of August "to give a lead in extending British holidays over a longer summer period". Each year's date was announced in Parliament on an ad hoc basis, to the despair of the calendar and diary publishing trade. The rule seems to have been to select the weekend of the last Saturday in August, so that in 1968 and 1969 Bank Holiday Monday actually fell in September.

Banking and Financial Dealings Act 1971 (Note: Section 5(1).)
- Act of Parliament
- Parliament of the United Kingdom
- Long title: An Act to make new provision in place of the Bank Holidays Act 1871, to confer power to suspend financial and other dealings on bank holidays or other days, and to amend the law relating to bills of exchange and promissory notes with reference to the maturity of bills and notes and other matters affected by the closing of banks on Saturdays, and for purposes connected therewith.
- Citation: 1971 c. 80
- Territorial extent: England and Wales; Scotland; Northern Ireland (except section 4(2).; (Note: Section 5(2).)

Dates
- Royal assent: 16 December 1971
- Commencement: 16 December 1971 (rest of act); 16 January 1971 (section 3) (Note: Section 3(3).)
Other legislation
Amends	Holidays Extension Act 1875; Bills of Exchange Act 1882; Customs and Excise Act 1952; Factories Act 1961
Repeals/revokes	Bank Holidays Act 1871; Revenue Offices (Scotland) Holidays Act 1880; Bank Holiday (Ireland) Act 1903
Amended by	Northern Ireland Constitution Act 1973; Finance Act 1981; Building Societies Act 1986; Finance Act 1987; Employment Act 1989; Postal Services Act 2000 (Consequential Modifications No. 1) Order 2001; St Andrew's Day Bank Holiday (Scotland) Act 2007

Status: Amended

Text of statute as originally enacted

Text of the Banking and Financial Dealings Act 1971 as in force today (including any amendments) within the United Kingdom, from legislation.gov.uk.

A century after the 1871 act, the Banking and Financial Dealings Act 1971 (c. 80), which currently regulates bank holidays in the UK, was passed. The majority of the current bank holidays were specified in the 1971 Act: however New Year's Day and May Day were not introduced throughout the whole of the UK until 1974 and 1978 respectively. The date of the August bank holiday was changed from the first Monday in August to the last Monday in August in England, Wales and Northern Ireland (but not in Scotland), and the Whitsun bank holiday (Whit Monday) was replaced by the Late Spring Bank Holiday, fixed as the last Monday in May. From 1978, the final Monday of May in Scotland (a statutory holiday in the rest of the UK) and the first Monday in May in the rest of the UK (a statutory holiday in Scotland) have been proclaimed as bank holidays.

In January 2007, the St Andrew's Day Bank Holiday (Scotland) Act 2007 was given royal assent, making 30 November (or the following Monday if 30 November falls on a weekend) a bank holiday in Scotland.

== Future ==
There are calls for extra public holidays on the patron saints' days in England (for St. George's Day), and Wales (for St. David's Day). For example, in 2018 the Labour Party announced it would make those days bank holidays if elected. The same year, an online petition to the Prime Minister as to Wales received 3,577 signatures.

In 2009, it was reported that St Piran's Day (patron saint of Cornwall) on 5 March is already given as an unofficial day off to many government and other workers in the county. It is suggested that a move from the May bank holiday to a St Piran's Day bank holiday in Cornwall would benefit the Cornish economy by £20–35 million.

The number of holidays in the UK is relatively small compared to many other European countries. However, direct comparison is inaccurate since the 'substitute day' scheme of deferment does not apply in most European countries, where holidays that coincide with a weekend (29% of fixed-date holidays) are "lost". In fact, the average number of non-weekend holidays in such countries is only marginally higher (and in some cases lower) than the UK. Worth mentioning is that public holidays in Europe which fall on Thursday or Tuesday typically become "puente" or "bridge" four-day or even six-day extended holiday weekends as people tend to use one or two days from their holiday entitlement to take off Monday and/or Friday.

After the election of the coalition government in May 2010, the Department of Culture, Media and Sport launched a pre-consultation in 2011 which included the suggestion of moving the May Day Bank Holiday to October, to be a "UK Day" or "Trafalgar Day" (21 October) or to St David's Day and St George's Day.

== Legal basis ==
Bank holidays are established in several ways:

- by statute (statutory holidays) – Holidays specifically listed in the Banking and Financial Dealings Act 1971.
- by royal proclamation – Under the Banking and Financial Dealings Act 1971, bank holidays are proclaimed each year by the legal device of a royal proclamation.
- by convention (common law holidays) - Holidays established in common law (not applicable in Scotland)

Royal proclamation is also used to move bank holidays that would otherwise fall on a weekend and to create extra one-off bank holidays for special occasions. The Act does not provide for a bank holiday to be suppressed by royal proclamation without appointing another day in its place. In this way, public holidays are not "lost" in years when they coincide with weekends. These deferred bank holiday days are termed a "bank holiday in lieu" of the typical anniversary date. In the legislation they are known as "substitute days". The movement of the St Andrew's Day Scottish holiday to the nearest Monday when 30 November is a weekend day is statutory and does not require a proclamation. Bank holidays falling on a weekend are always moved to a later date, not an earlier one.

=== Workers' rights ===
Although there is no statutory right for workers to take paid leave on bank holidays, where paid leave is given (either because the business is closed or for other reasons), the bank holiday can count towards the minimum statutory holiday entitlement. Likewise, if people are required to work on a bank holiday, there is no statutory right to an enhanced pay rate nor to a day off in lieu, although many employers do give either or both. Any rights in this respect depend on the person's contract of employment. The statutory minimum paid holidays is 28 days (or 5.6 weeks) a year under the Working Time Regulations 1998 (including any bank holidays or public holidays that are taken).

== Dates in England, Northern Ireland, and Wales ==
Date	Occasion	Type	Notes	Region	
Date	Occasion	Type	Notes	England and Wales	Northern Ireland
1/2/3 January	New Year's Day	Proclaimed	Falls on 1 January unless this is a Saturday or Sunday. 1 January was not a statutory holiday before 1974. In a year in which it does not occur on 1 January, it can be referred to (as for all such dates in lieu) in various ways, such as "Monday bank holiday instead of New Year's Day". In many British diary series, it may be marked "New Year's Day holiday" with or without "(in lieu)" afterwards. Falls on 1 January in 2026.	Yes	Yes
17/18/19 March	Saint Patrick's Day	Statutory or proclaimed	Northern Ireland only. 17 March by statute if this is not a Sunday. 18 March by statute if this is a Monday. 19 March by proclamation if this is a Monday. Falls on 17 March in 2026.	No	Yes
Variable	Good Friday	Common law	Falls on 3 April in 2026.	Yes	Yes
Variable	Easter Monday	Statutory	Statutory bank holiday from 1871, defined by name. Falls on 6 April in 2026.	Yes	Yes
First Monday in May	Early May bank holiday	Proclaimed	From 1978, by Royal Proclamation. Falls on 4 May in 2026.	Yes	Yes
Last Monday in May	Spring Bank Holiday	Statutory	Statutory bank holiday from 1971, following a trial period from 1965 to 1971. Replaced Whit Monday, 50 days after Easter Day, which had been a public holiday since 1871. Most schools fix a minimum of a week's break to coincide, giving the alternative name. The legislation does not specify a name for the holiday, merely when it occurs. It normally falls on the last Monday in May, but in 2002, 2012 and 2022 it was moved a few days into June and was followed by an extra bank holiday, in order to create a four-day jubilee weekend in celebration of Elizabeth II's 50, 60 and 70 years of reign. Falls on 25 May in 2026.	Yes	Yes
12/13/14 July	Battle of the Boyne (Orangeman's Day)	Proclaimed	Northern Ireland only. Falls on 12 July unless this is a Saturday or Sunday. Falls on 13 July in 2026.	No	Yes
Last Monday in August	Summer Bank Holiday	Statutory	Statutory bank holiday from 1971, following a trial period from 1965 to 1971. Replaced the first Monday in August (formerly commonly known as "August Bank Holiday") which had been in use from 1871. The legislation does not specify a name for the holiday, merely when it occurs. Falls on 31 August in 2026.	Yes	Yes
25 December	Christmas Day	Common law		Yes	Yes
26 December/None	Boxing Day	Statutory	Statutory bank holiday from 1871. Legislation does not name the holiday, but states that it falls on "26th December, if it be not a Sunday." Public Holiday in 2026.	Yes	Yes
27 December/None	Not named	Statutory	Only in a year in which 25 December is either on a Saturday or Sunday. This has the effect of adding an extra holiday when 25 December falls on a Sunday.	Yes	Yes
28 December	Substitute day (for Boxing Day)	Statutory	This is an extra holiday added when 26 December falls on a Sunday.	Yes	Yes
Total holidays				8	10

=== Changes ===
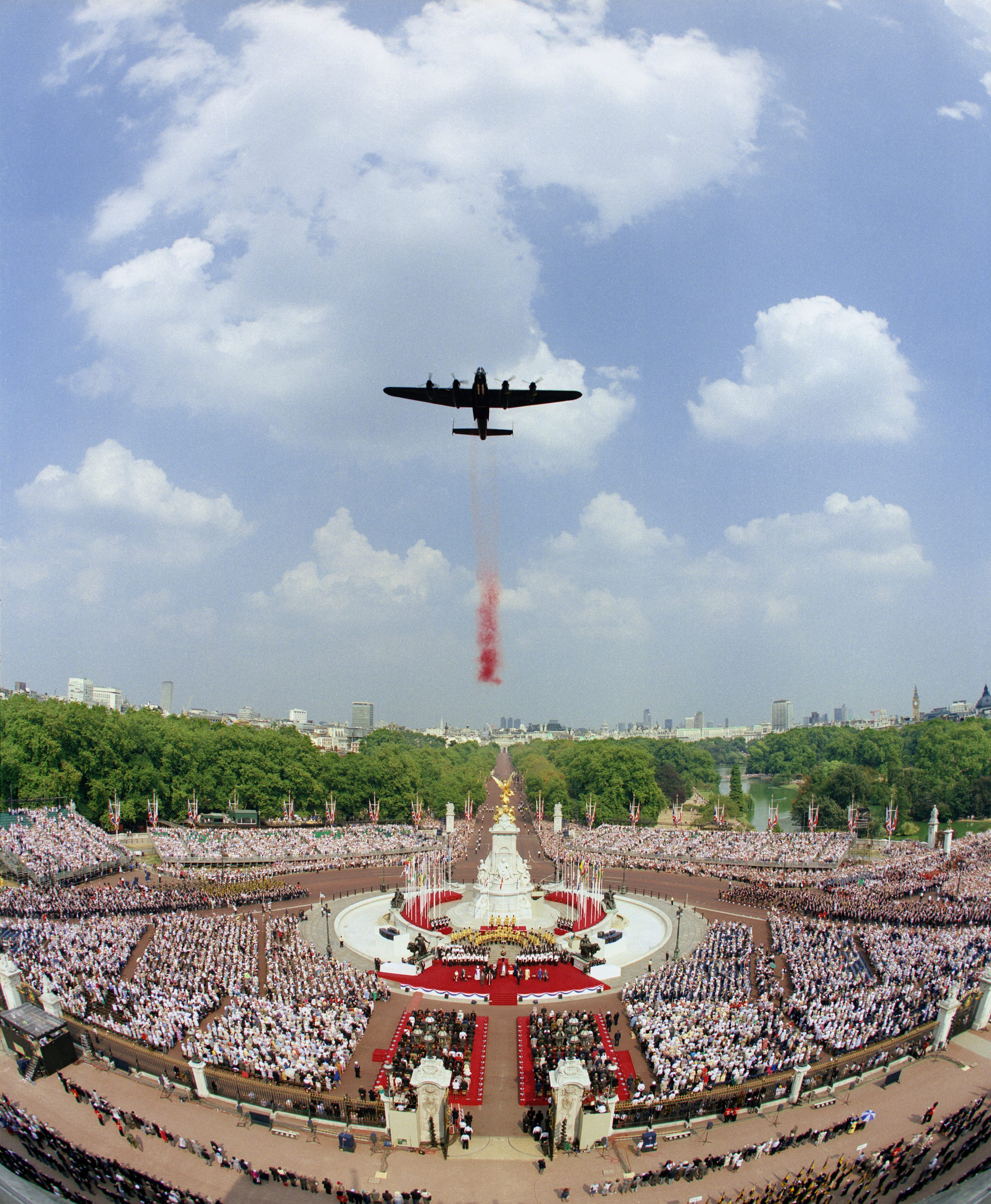
In 1995 the early May bank holiday was moved to 8 May for the 50th anniversary of VE Day

- In 1968 and 1969 the new "August" bank holiday fell in September. This was as a result of the decision to move the holiday to the end of the month, and the nearest Monday being taken. The current definition was introduced in 1971.
- In 1995 the early May bank holiday was moved to Monday 8 May to commemorate the 50th anniversary of VE Day.
- In 2002, there was a special holiday on Monday 3 June to celebrate the Golden Jubilee of Elizabeth II. The Spring Bank Holiday was moved from 27 May to 4 June to create a four-day weekend.
- In 2012, there was a special holiday on Tuesday 5 June to celebrate the Diamond Jubilee of Elizabeth II. The Spring Bank Holiday moved to Monday 4 June to create a four-day weekend.
- In 2020, the early May bank holiday originally set for Monday 4 May was moved to Friday 8 May to commemorate the 75th anniversary of VE Day.
- In 2022, there was a special holiday on Friday 3 June to celebrate the Platinum Jubilee of Elizabeth II. The Spring Bank Holiday was moved to Thursday 2 June to create a four-day weekend.

== Dates in Scotland ==
=== National bank holidays ===
Date	Occasion	Type	Notes
1/2/4 January	New Year's Day	Statutory or proclaimed	1 January by statute when this is not a Saturday or Sunday. 2 January by statute when this is a Monday. 4 January by proclamation when this is a Tuesday.
2/3/4 January	New Year Holiday	Statutory or proclaimed	2 January by statute when this is not a Saturday or Sunday. 3 January by statute when this a Monday, or by proclamation when this is a Tuesday. 4 January by proclamation when this is a Monday.
Variable	Good Friday	Statutory	
First Monday in May	Early May bank holiday	Statutory	
Last Monday in May	Spring bank holiday	Proclaimed	
First Monday in August	Summer bank holiday	Statutory	The Summer bank holiday remains on its original date in Scotland. Falls on 3 August in 2026.
30 November	St. Andrew's Day	Statutory	Unlike other bank holidays it must be taken by workers in lieu of another bank holiday.
25 December	Christmas Day	Statutory	The observance of Christmas Day was abolished by an Act of Parliament in 1640. It was included in the schedule to the Bank Holidays Act 1871.
26/27/28 December	Boxing Day	Proclaimed	Boxing Day (26 December) became a public holiday in Scotland in 1974. See also Christmas in Scotland.

=== Local holidays ===
Local holidays are determined by local authorities across Scotland. Some of these may be taken in lieu of statutory holidays while others may be additional holidays, although many companies, including Royal Mail, do not follow all the holidays listed below, and many swap between English and local holidays.

Since Easter 1996 the Scottish clearing banks have harmonised the days on which they are closed with those in England and Wales and are therefore closed on Easter Monday and the last Monday in August (rather than the first). This has resulted in a number of local authorities creating a public holiday on Easter Monday. Previously Easter Monday had not been a public holiday in Scotland.

There have been protests about banks opening on 2 January since this decision was taken. This has resulted in many banks now providing only a limited service on 2 January, with most members of staff still entitled to the holiday.

Date	Name	Major towns/cities (not an exhaustive list)
1 January	New Year's Day	all
2 January	2 January	all
Wednesday after last Tuesday in January	Day after Up Helly Aa fire festival	Shetland
First Monday in February	Winter Holiday	Inverness
First Monday in March		Inverness
Last Monday in March		Lochaber
Easter holiday (variable)	Good Friday	Ayr, Dumfries and Galloway, East Dunbartonshire, Edinburgh, Falkirk, Inverclyde, Kilmarnock, Paisley, Stirling, South Lanarkshire, West Dunbartonshire
Easter holiday (variable)	Easter Monday	Ayr, Edinburgh, Falkirk, East Dunbartonshire, Glasgow, Inverclyde, Kilmarnock, North Lanarkshire, Paisley, Stirling, South Lanarkshire, West Dunbartonshire
First Monday in April	Spring Holiday	Carnoustie and Monifieth area, Dundee, Fife, Scottish Borders, Inverness, Perth
Second Monday in April	Spring Holiday	Angus, except Carnoustie and Monifieth area, Elgin
Third Monday in April, or preceding week if would otherwise coincide with Easter Monday	Spring Holiday	Edinburgh
Monday in April; date varies from year to year	Spring Holiday	Aberdeen
Last Monday in April	Spring Holiday	Inverclyde
First Monday in May	Labour Day or Early May Bank Holiday	all
Tuesday after first Monday in May	Victoria Day (*)/Spring Holiday	Clydebank, Stirling
Last Monday strictly before 24 May	Victoria Day (*)/Spring Holiday	Edinburgh*
Fourth Monday in May	Victoria Day (*)/Spring Holiday	Perth*
Last Monday in May	Victoria Day (*)/Spring Holiday	Ayr, Dundee*, East Dunbartonshire, Glasgow, North Lanarkshire, Paisley*, South Lanarkshire
First Monday in June	Victoria Day (*)/Spring Holiday	Galashiels, Inverclyde, Fife
Tuesday after second Thursday in June	Linlithgow Marches	Linlithgow
Second Thursday in June	Lanimer Day	Lanark area only
Last Monday in June	Fair Holiday	Elgin
Saturday preceding first Monday in July	Fair Holiday	Edinburgh
First Monday in July	Fair Holiday	Falkirk, Inverness
First Friday in July	Braw Lads Gathering	Galashiels
Second Monday in July	Fair Holiday	Aberdeen
Third Monday in July	Fair Holiday	Arbroath, Fife, East Dunbartonshire, Glasgow, North Lanarkshire, South Lanarkshire except Lanark
Fourth Friday in July	Fair Holiday	Scottish Borders
Last Monday in July	Fair Holiday	Dundee
First Monday in August	Fair Holiday	Paisley
First Monday in September	Late Summer Holiday	Elgin, Inverclyde
Second Monday in September	Battle of Stirling Bridge	Falkirk, Perth, Stirling
Third Friday in September	Ayr Gold Cup	Ayr, Kilmarnock
Monday after third Friday in September	Ayr Gold Cup	Ayr, Kilmarnock
Third Monday in September	Autumn Holiday	Edinburgh
Last Monday in September	Autumn Holiday	Aberdeen, Angus except Carnoustie and Monifieth area, East Dunbartonshire, Glasgow, North Lanarkshire, Paisley, South Lanarkshire, West Dunbartonshire
First Monday in October	Autumn Holiday	Carnoustie and Monifieth area, Dundee, Inverness, Perth
Second Monday in October	Autumn Holiday	Scottish Borders
Third Monday in October	Autumn Holiday	Elgin, Fife
First Monday in November	Samhain holiday	Inverness
30 November	St. Andrew's Day To be taken in lieu of one of the other statutory holidays at discretion of individual companies/authorities.	an official holiday in Angus, Fife, Scottish Borders

== Special holidays ==
- During the sterling crisis of 1968, Prime Minister Harold Wilson convened a meeting of the privy council in the early hours of 14 March to declare 15 March a bank holiday. This allowed the UK government to close the London gold market to stem the losses being suffered by the British pound. It was this meeting that triggered the resignation of Foreign Secretary George Brown.
- 14 November 1973 was made a special bank holiday to celebrate the wedding of Princess Anne and Mark Phillips.
- 7 June 1977 was made a special bank holiday as part of the Silver Jubilee of Elizabeth II.
- The wedding of Charles, Prince of Wales, and Lady Diana Spencer on 29 July 1981 resulted in an extra bank holiday.
- 31 December 1999 was a one-off bank holiday as part of the Millennium celebrations.
- In 2002, there was a special holiday on Monday 3 June to celebrate the Golden Jubilee of Elizabeth II. The Spring Bank Holiday was moved from 27 May to 4 June to create a four-day weekend.
- Friday 29 April 2011 was a special bank holiday to celebrate the wedding of Prince William and Catherine Middleton.
- In 2012, there was a special holiday on Tuesday 5 June to celebrate the Diamond Jubilee of Elizabeth II. Therefore, to create a four-day weekend, the Spring Bank Holiday that would usually have occurred at the end of May was moved to Monday 4 June.
- In 2022, there was a special holiday on Friday 3 June to celebrate the Platinum Jubilee of Elizabeth II. Therefore, to create a four-day weekend, the Spring Bank Holiday that would usually occur at the end of May was moved to Thursday 2 June.
- An additional public holiday was declared in 2022 for Monday 19 September, the day of the State Funeral of Queen Elizabeth II.
- Monday 8 May 2023 was an additional public holiday to commemorate the Coronation of King Charles III and Queen Camilla.

== See also ==
- UK labour law
- List of holidays by country
- Public and bank holidays in Scotland
- Public holidays in Gibraltar
- Public holidays in Guernsey
- Public holidays in Jersey
- Public holidays in the Isle of Man
- Public holidays in Anguilla
- Public holidays in Bermuda
- Public holidays in the British Virgin Islands
- Public holidays in the Cayman Islands
- Public holidays in the Falkland Islands
- Public holidays in Montserrat
- Public holidays in the Pitcairn Islands
- Public holidays in Saint Helena, Ascension and Tristan da Cunha
- Public holidays in the Turks and Caicos Islands
