= Labour for an Independent Wales =

Political faction in Wales

Labour for an Independent Wales (Welsh: Llafur dros Gymru Annibynnol) is a group of Labour Party members who "believe the best way to achieve a democratic socialist Wales is through independence".

== Background ==
Labour for an Independent Wales was first formed by Ben Gwalchmai and Huw Lloyd-Williams in the cafe of the Senedd in February, 2017. They held their first event with Neville Southall, at Welsh Labour Conference 2018. A second event took place at the 2019 Welsh Labour conference. The group formed a constitution in 2020. An executive committee was elected in 2021.

In 2022, Chair of the group was Rachel Garrick.

== Support for independence in Welsh Labour ==
Elystan Morgan (1932-2021), a former Labour MP for Ceredigion and a life peer in the House of Lords, was a lifelong supporter of devolution and, following the Brexit vote, for dominion status for Wales.

Gwynoro Jones, a former Labour MP has argued for a constitutional convention that would explore a movement towards a sovereign Wales.

In August 2020, a YouGov poll showed that "if there was a referendum tomorrow", 39% of Welsh Labour voters would vote for independence with 37% against. The Welsh Governance Centre also found that at the time of the 2016 Senedd election, over 40% of Labour voters supported independence.

Blaenavon council, with a Labour majority, voted in to support independence.

In the 2021 Senedd election the co-founder of Labour for an Independent Wales, Ben Gwalchmai, was selected as the first openly pro-independence Welsh Labour Senedd candidate in the history of the Senedd; Dylan Lewis-Rowlands and then Cian Ireland were later selected as the second and third openly pro-independence Welsh Labour Senedd candidates.

It has been suggested by Labour for an Independent Wales that Welsh Labour could support Welsh independence in the future.

== Vision ==
Labour for an independent Wales set out their answers to the public consultation of the Independent Commission on the Constitutional Future of Wales:

- "constitutional, environmental, legal, and social systems in place for a fair & sustainable country"
- "building a national framework fit for the 21st Century, containing all the constitutional, environmental, legal, and social systems necessary for a fair & sustainable country"
- Oath of allegiance to the people of Wales, rather than the monarch and nationalising the crown estate of Wales
- To become an sovereign nation state with a Welsh central bank
- "putting people and the environment first, not profit"
- "changes to the constitution of Wales should be part of a nation-wide consultation"
- "Strengthening and developing the Welsh language"

== See also ==
- Plaid Cymru
