= St Andrew's Day Bank Holiday (Scotland) Act 2007 =

Act of the Scottish Parliament

St Andrew's Day Bank Holiday (Scotland) Act 2007 (Note: Section 2(1).)
- Act of the Scottish Parliament
- Scottish Parliament
- Long title: An Act of the Scottish Parliament to establish a bank holiday for St Andrew's Day.
- Citation: 2007 asp 2
- Introduced by: Dennis Canavan
- Territorial extent: Scotland

Dates
- Royal assent: 15 January 2007
- Commencement: 16 January 2007 (Note: Section 2(2).)
Other legislation
Amends	Banking and Financial Dealings Act 1971

Status: Current legislation

Text of statute as originally enacted

Text of the St Andrew's Day Bank Holiday (Scotland) Act 2007 as in force today (including any amendments) within the United Kingdom, from legislation.gov.uk.

The St Andrew's Day Bank Holiday (Scotland) Act 2007 (asp 2) is an act of the Scottish Parliament that officially designates St. Andrew's Day (30 November) to be a bank holiday in Scotland.

== Background ==
The bill that led to the act being passed was first proposed by Dennis Canavan, Independent Member of the Scottish Parliament (MSP) for Falkirk West, in 2003. The first reading of the bill was rejected in 2005 by the Scottish Parliament; at the time the Scottish Executive was opposed to the idea of another bank holiday, and the Scottish Chambers of Commerce claimed that an extra holiday would cost the country £400 million in lost productivity.

In May 2005, Samantha Mungall, Iain Scherr and Alexandra Gill – three first year students at Clyde Valley High – presented a petition before the Public Petitions Committee to make this a national holiday. Their petition was discussed and was accepted, and this propelled the bill along.

The bill was sent back to the Scottish Parliament's Enterprise and Culture Committee, and was eventually supported by Jack McConnell, the then First Minister, after a compromise agreement was reached whereby the holiday would not be an additional entitlement. The First Minister stated that he believed that employers and employees should mark the day with a holiday, but that this should be as a substitute for an existing local holiday, rather than an additional one.

The bill was passed by the Scottish Parliament on 29 November 2006, and received Royal Assent on 15 January 2007.

== Provisions ==
The act amends the Banking and Financial Dealings Act 1971, an act of the Parliament of the United Kingdom which sets out the official bank holidays for England and Wales, Scotland and Northern Ireland.

The act designates the day as a voluntary bank holiday rather than a full public holiday.

If St Andrew's Day is on a Saturday or Sunday, the next Monday is designated as the bank holiday.

== See also ==
- Bank holidays in Scotland
