= Bank Holidays Act 1871 =

Act of the Parliament of the United Kingdom

Bank Holidays Act 1871 (Note: Section 7.)
- Act of Parliament
- Parliament of the United Kingdom
- Long title: An Act to make provision for Bank Holidays, and respecting obligations to make payments and do other acts on such Bank Holidays.
- Citation: 34 & 35 Vict. c. 17
- Introduced by: Sir John Lubbock (Commons)
- Territorial extent: United Kingdom

Dates
- Royal assent: 25 May 1871
- Commencement: 25 May 1871 (Note: Section 1.)
- Repealed: 16 December 1971
Other legislation
Repealed by	Banking and Financial Dealings Act 1971

Status: Repealed

Text of statute as originally enacted

The Bank Holidays Act 1871 (34 & 35 Vict. c. 17) was an act of the Parliament of the United Kingdom that established public holidays (known as bank holidays) in addition to those customarily recognised in the United Kingdom.

The act designated four bank holidays in England, Wales and Ireland (Easter Monday; Whit Monday; First Monday in August; 26 December if a weekday) and five in Scotland (New Year's Day, or the next day if a Sunday; Good Friday; First Monday in May; First Monday in August; and Christmas Day, or the next day if a Sunday).

In England, Wales and Ireland, Good Friday and Christmas Day were considered traditional days of rest (as were Sundays) and therefore it was felt unnecessary to include them in the Act, especially as the Act extended the existing law relating to those days to the new bank holidays.

The act was introduced by John Lubbock, 1st Baron Avebury who originally proposed four bank holidays in England and Wales (Easter Monday, the first Monday in August, Whit Monday, and Boxing Day) and five in Scotland, which had a slightly different cultural calendar. They were added to the traditional religious holidays. Some people even nicknamed these new holidays "St Lubbock’s Days".

== Subsequent developments ==
The whole act was repealed by section 4(5) of, and part II of schedule 2 to, the Banking and Financial Dealings Act 1971, which came into force on 16 December 1971.

== Bibliography ==
- "History of Bank & Public Holidays". Department for Business Enterprise & Regulatory Reform. Archived from the original on 7 December 2008.
