= Public holidays in Gibraltar =

The public holidays in Gibraltar are a mix of "bank holidays" and "public holidays" and are often used interchangeably, although strictly and legally there is a difference. Bank holidays are holidays when banks and many other businesses are closed for the day. Public holidays are holidays which have been observed through custom and practice.

| Date | Name | Notes |
|---|---|---|
| 1 January | New Year's Day | from 1974, by Royal Proclamation. currently not proclaimed if 1 January falls on Saturday or Sunday. |
| Third Monday in February | Winter Midterm Bank Holiday | Usually, but in 2021 it was held on 15 February. |
| Variable | Good Friday | Traditional common law holiday Falls on 18 April in 2025. |
| Variable | Easter Monday | Statutory bank holiday, defined by name. Falls on 21 April in 2025. |
| 28 April | Workers' Memorial Day | |
| 1 May | May Day Bank Holiday | |
| Last Monday in May | Spring Bank Holiday | Statutory bank holiday from 1971, following a trial period from 1965 to 1970. Replaced Whit Monday, which was formerly a public holiday whose date varied according to the date of Easter. The legislation does not specify a name for the holiday, merely when it occurs. Falls on 26 May in 2025. |
| Third Monday in June | King's Birthday | |
| Last Monday in August | Summer Bank Holiday | Statutory bank holiday from 1971, following a trial period from 1965 to 1970. Replaced the first Monday in August (formerly commonly known as "August Bank Holiday". The legislation does not specify a name for the holiday, merely when it occurs. Falls on 25 August in 2025. |
| 10 September | Gibraltar National Day | |
| 25 December | Christmas Day | Traditional common law holiday |
| 26 December | Boxing Day | Statutory bank holiday. Legislation does not name the holiday, but states that it falls on "26th December, if it be not a Saturday or Sunday." Falls on Monday 28 December 2020 (In lieu of Saturday 26 December 2020) |

== Notes ==
- In 2020, 8 May was also a public holiday to commemorate the 75th anniversary of VE Day.
