= Saint David's Day =

Cultural and religious celebration on 1 March

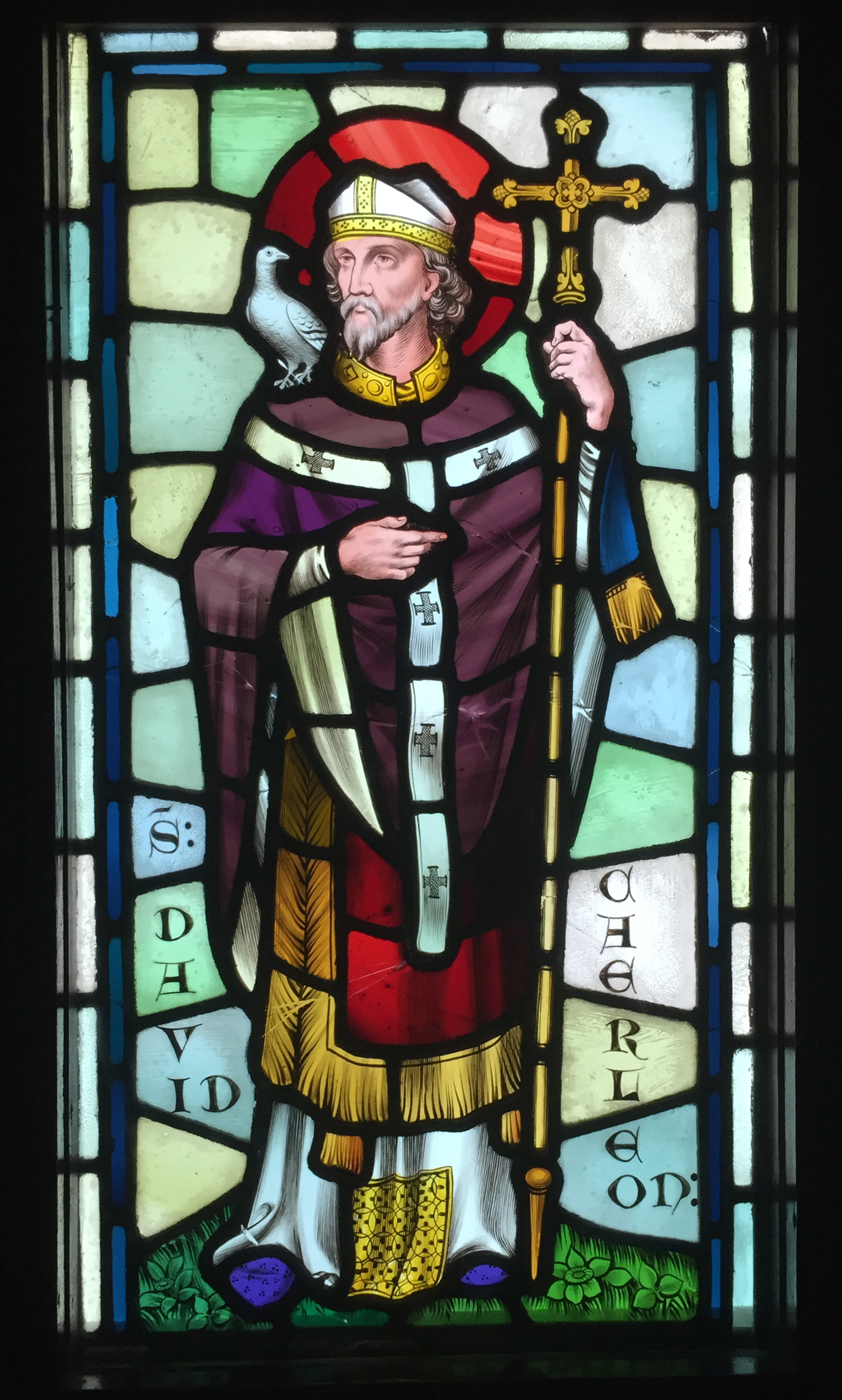
- Stained glass depiction of Saint David, designed by William Burges, at Castell Coch, Cardiff
- Official name: Dydd Gŵyl Dewi Sant
- Observed by: Wales; Welsh people Welsh diaspora Anglican Communion; Catholic Church
- Type: National
- Celebrations: Children participate in an eisteddfod
- Observances: Parades; Wearing Welsh emblems
- Date: 1 March
- Frequency: Annual

Saint David's Day (Welsh: Dydd Gŵyl Dewi Sant or Dydd Gŵyl Dewi [ˈdɨːð ˌɡuːɨ̯l ˌdɛu̯.i ˈsant, ˈdiːð ̩ɡʊi̯l ˌdɛu̯.i]), or the Feast of Saint David, is the feast day of Saint David, the patron saint of Wales, and falls on 1 March, the date of Saint David's death in 589 AD.

Traditional festivities include wearing leeks and daffodils (both recognised as symbols of Saint David and more widely as symbols of Wales) eating traditional Welsh dishes such as cawl and Welsh cakes, and wearing traditional Welsh costume. School celebrations, including concerts and eisteddfodau, have been common since the early 20th century and played a significant role in the cultural education of Welsh schoolchildren. An increasing number of cities and towns across Wales, including Cardiff, Swansea, and Aberystwyth also put on parades throughout the day.

The feast has been regularly celebrated since the canonisation of David, in the 12th century by Pope Callixtus II. However, it is not recognised as a public holiday by the government of Wales or the United Kingdom, which has prompted calls for St. David's Day to be a bank holiday in Wales and some organisations designating unofficial celebrations.

== History ==
Saint David (Welsh: Dewi Sant) is said to have been born to Saint Non at Caerfai, southwest Wales. He was reportedly a scion of the royal house of Ceredigion, and founded a number of monastic communities in his early life before establishing his most notable community in Meneva, at the "Glyn Rhosyn" (English: Vale of Roses), the location where St Davids Cathedral stands today. By the end of his life, David was renowned throughout the Celtic church for his wisdom as a teacher and for his devout asceticism, with the founding of 1,200 Christian communities attributed to him and his followers. Saint David is said to have died on 1 March 589, with his foundation at Meneva quickly becoming an important shrine and site of pilgrimage after his death.

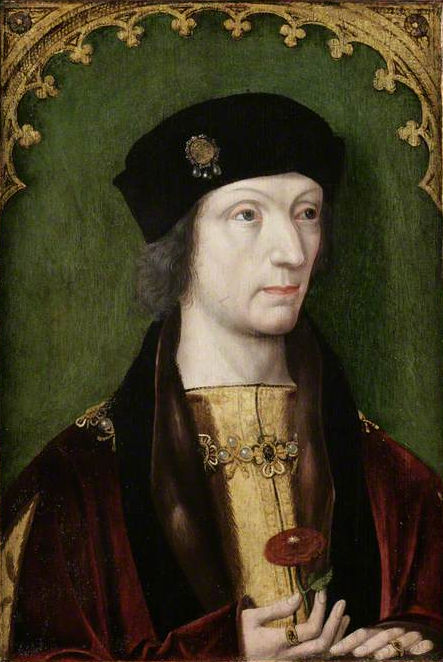
After his ascension to the throne of England, Henry Tudor financed royal Saint David Day celebrations at his courts and palaces

The feast day of Saint David on 1st March has been celebrated since at least the 10th century according to the Medieval Welsh literature such as the Annales Cambriae, with Saint David being widely recognised as the patron saint of Wales since at least the 12th century, and the peak of Welsh resistance to the Norman invasion. David was canonised in the Catholic church by Pope Callixtus II in 1120, thanks to the accession of Bishop Bernard, the first Norman bishop of Saint Davids and thus March 1st becoming an official celebration in the Catholic calendar.

During the War of the Roses in the 15th-century the celebration of Saint David, his flag and his feast day took on a new meaning following the landing of an invasion force at Mill Bay near Dale, Pembrokeshire. The invasion's leader was Henry Tudor, who linked his Welsh ancestry and used Welsh symbols such as Saint David's Feast Day during his march through Wales to encourage Welsh patriotism and gather support to his banner (a Welsh Dragon). In doing so, Henry amassed an army of about 5,000–6,000 soldiers which, though still outnumbered, decisively defeated Richard III of England at the Battle of Bosworth Field on 22 August 1485. After ascending to the throne of England as Henry VII, Henry regularly funded Saint David’s Day celebrations for his Palace staff, ordering Welsh mead and cheeses to be brought from Wales to his court in London.

The 17th-century diarist Samuel Pepys noted how Saint David's Day celebrations by the Welsh in London would spark anti-Welsh counter-celebrations, including the burning and symbolic lynching of life-sized effigies of Welshmen. By the 18th century, these customs continued and developed into English traditions such as the making of "taffies", an English confection where gingerbread figures are baked in the shape of a Welshman riding a goat.

== Celebration and traditions ==
Various Welsh Regiments of the British Army use aspects of Saint David's cross, Saint David himself, or songs of Saint David in their formalities during the celebrations. Many Welsh people wear one or both of the National symbols of Wales to celebrate St. David: the daffodil or the leek (Saint David's personal symbol) on this day. The leek arises when Welsh troops wore leeks to distinguish each other from similarly dressed English troops (some historical accounts indicate Saxon invading forces).

The flag of Saint David often plays a central role in the celebrations and can be seen flying throughout Wales. Popular dishes traditionally eaten on Saint David's Day include cawl (soup), bara brith tea loaf, Welsh Cakes, Welsh lamb and Welsh rarebit.

=== Wales ===
Around Wales each year, Saint David is commemorated in parades, the largest of which is in Cardiff. The parade is a non-military celebration of Welsh heritage and culture. To mark Saint David's Day and their return from a six-month tour of Afghanistan, soldiers from the Royal Welsh Regiment provided the Changing of the Guard ceremony at Cardiff Castle's south gate on 27 and 28 February 2010.

On 1 March 2010, the seventh National Saint David's Day Parade occurred in Cardiff city centre. Celebrations included concerts, a parade, and a food festival. The food festival ran from 26 February with the third annual Really Welsh Food Festival in Queen Street, featuring all-Welsh produce. Following the parade, several Welsh entertainers performed and in the evening Cardiff Central Library provided free entertainment and food.

Many towns now hold an annual parade through the town centre. Concerts are held in pubs, clubs, and other venues. In the town of Colwyn Bay in north Wales, an annual parade through the town centre is now held with several hundred citizens and schoolchildren participating. Other events are centred on the parade.

Swansea inaugurated a "St David's Week" festival in 2009 with a range of musical, sporting, and cultural events held throughout the city to mark the national day. For 2018, the city followed St David's Day celebrations with a two-day food festival.

A Celebration of St David's Day (c. 1750), anonymous painting

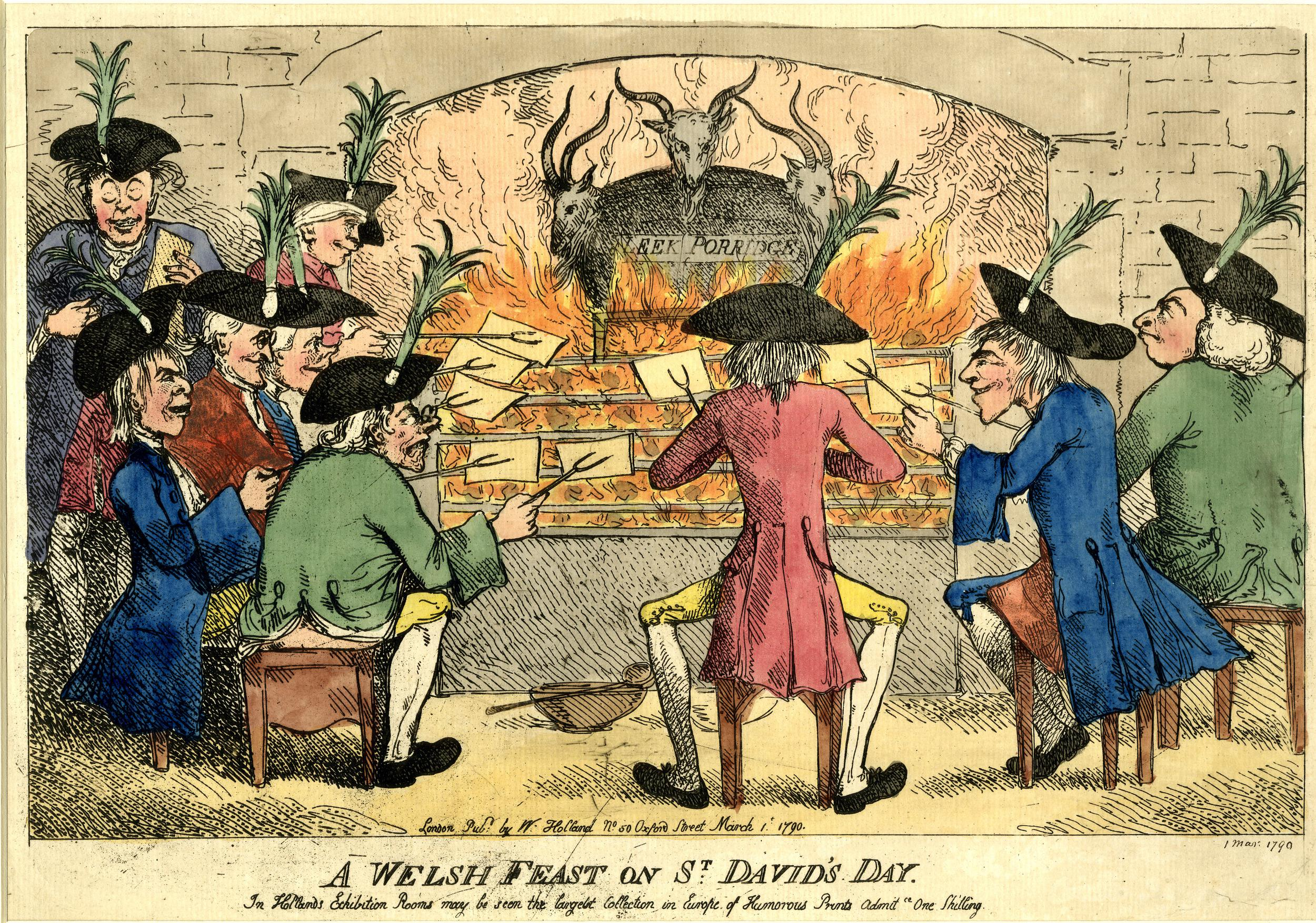
A Welsh feast on St David's day (1790), unflattering caricature of Welshmen celebrated St David's Day

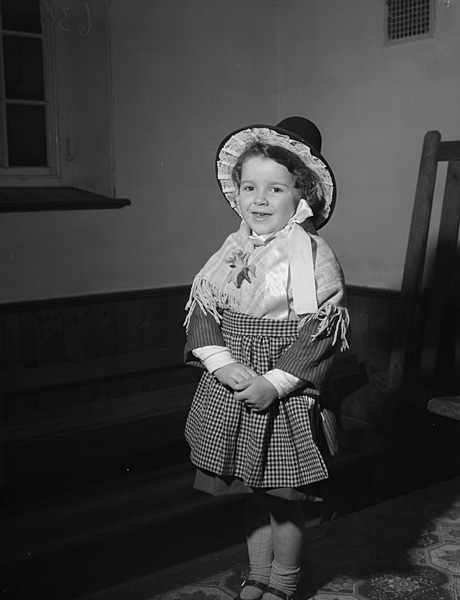
A girl wearing the Traditional Welsh costume for St Davids Day in Barmouth, 1960

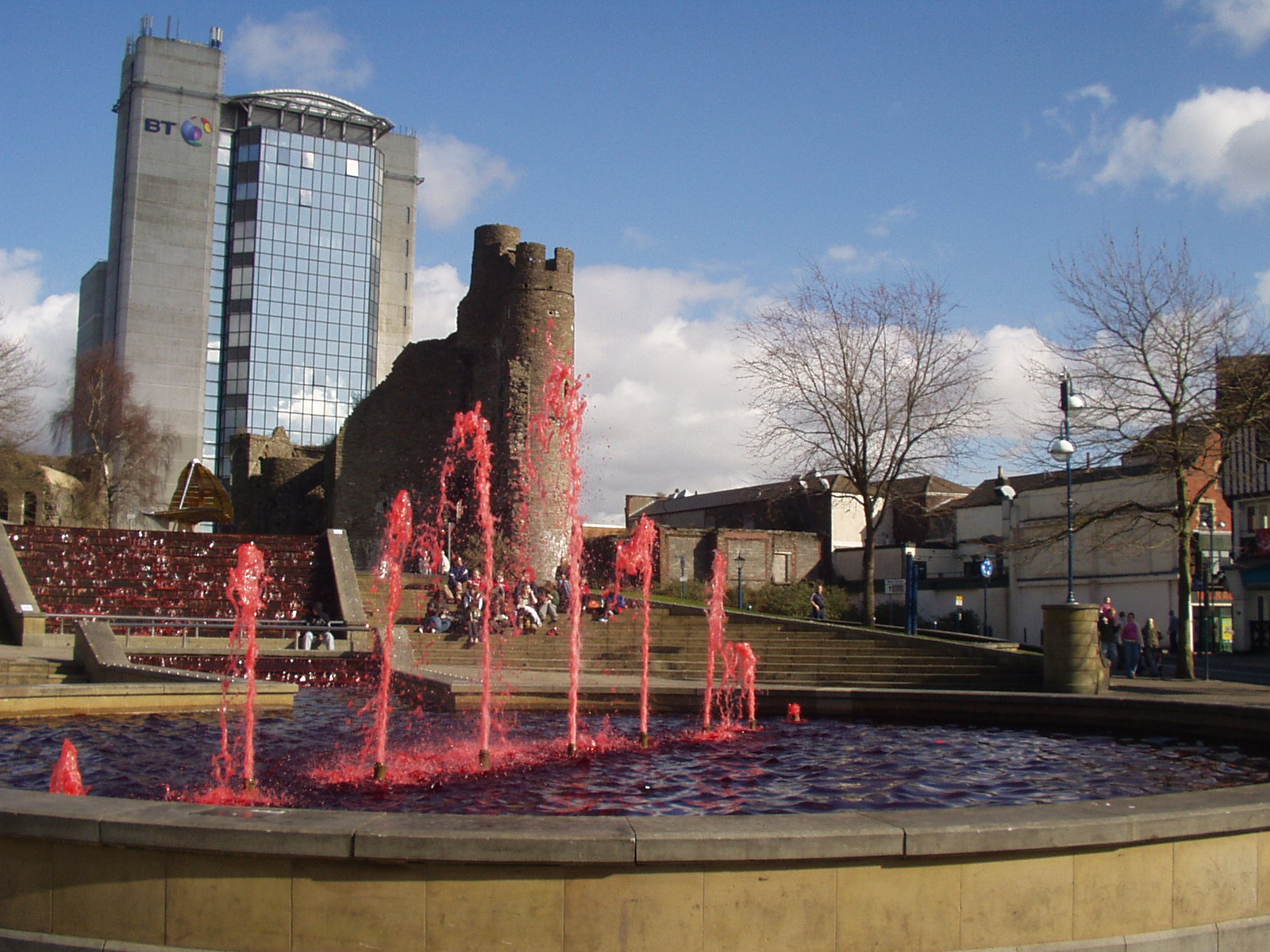
Water in Swansea Castle Square fountain dyed red for St David's Day

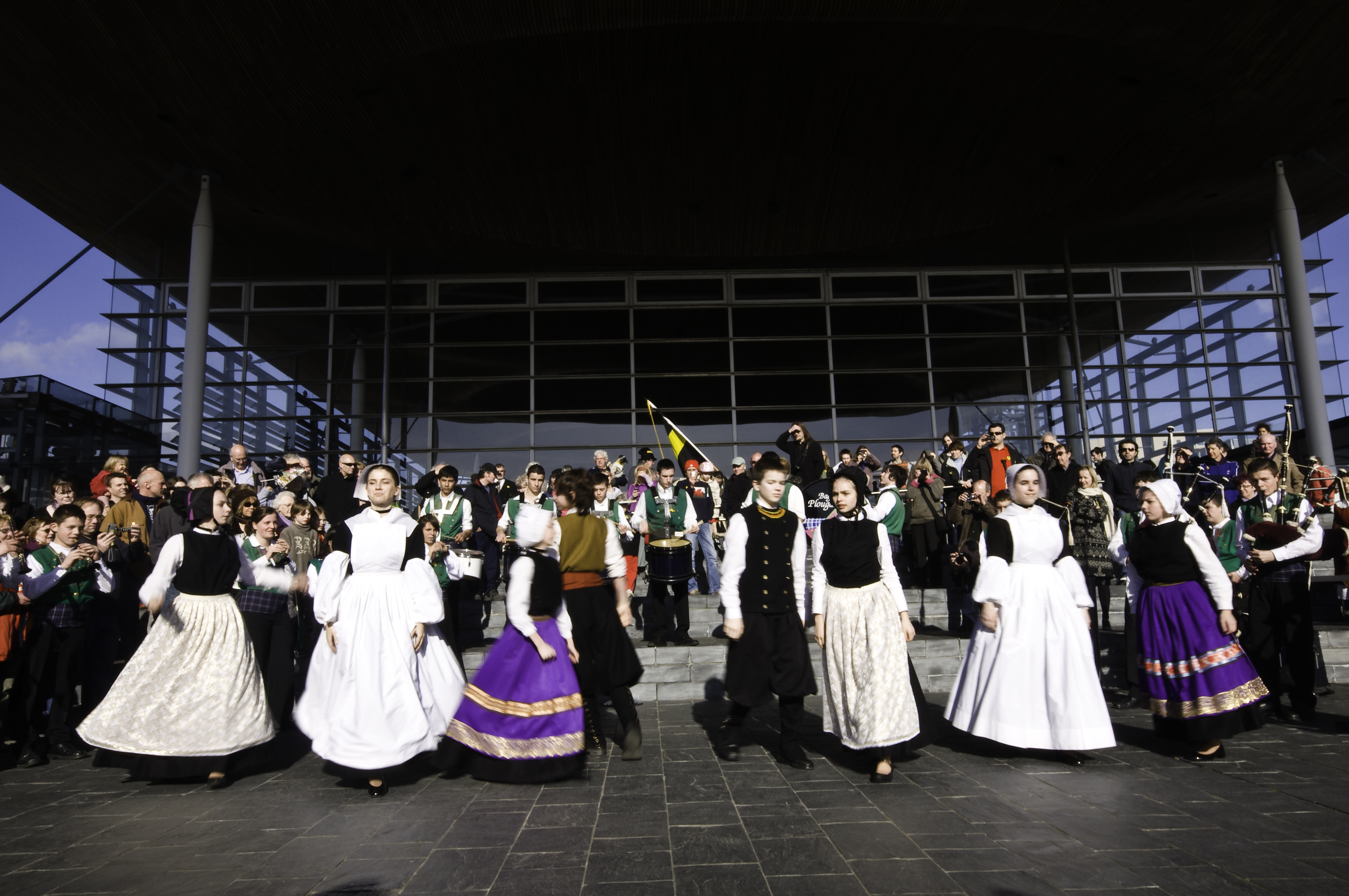
Traditional Welsh dance at the Senedd (Welsh Parliament) St David's Day celebrations, 2009

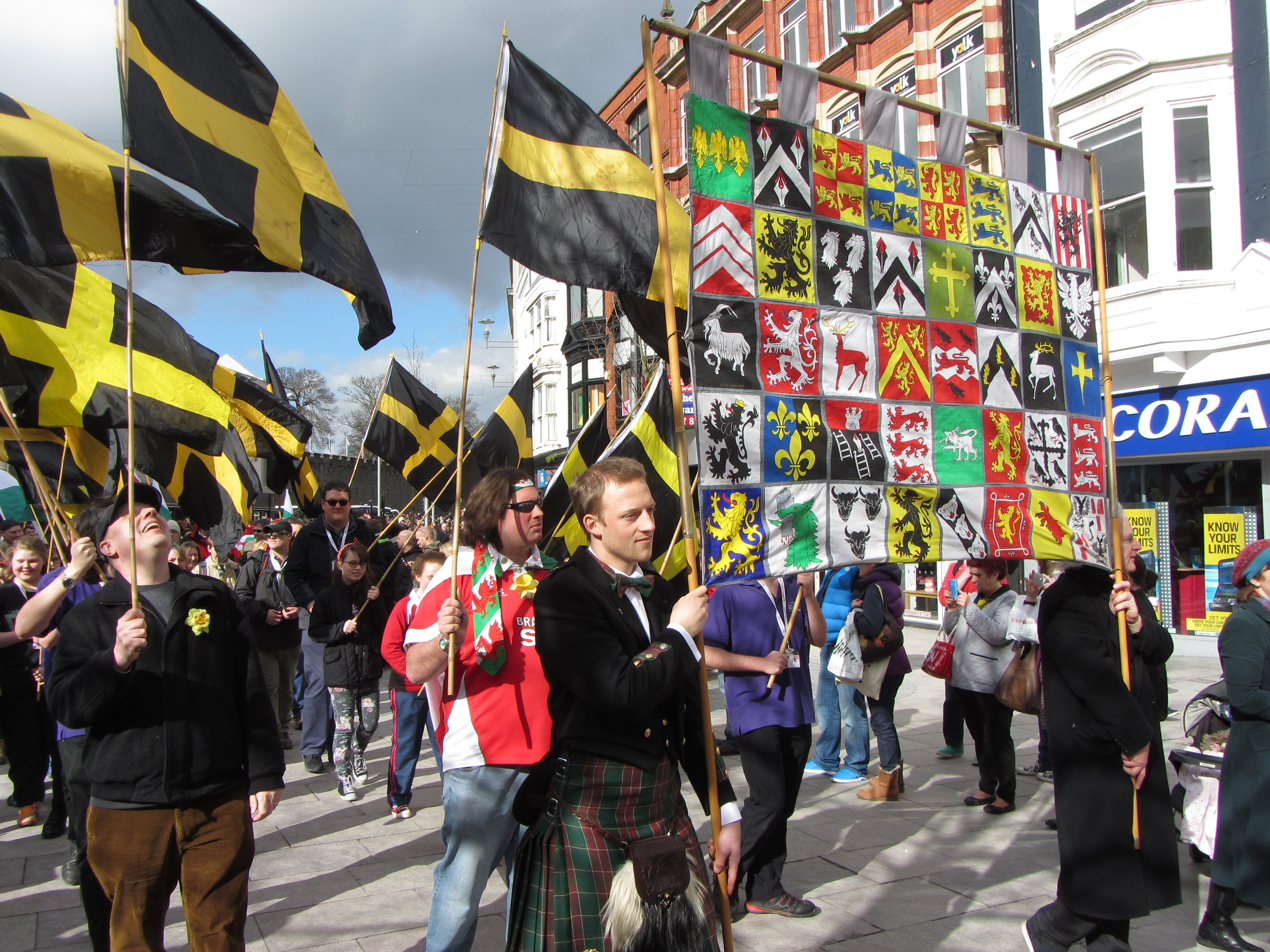
2014 Saint David's Day celebrations, Cardiff, with the flags of Saint David being waved.

Mark Drakeford, First Minister of Wales gives the Annual Saint David's Day Message to the Nation in 2021.

==== School celebrations ====
Russell Grigg, an historian of early St David's Day celebrations in schools, comments that the day has been "one of the most significant events in the school calendar of Wales for more than a century". The first examples of school events for St David's Day were organised in the late 19th century and often linked to the contemporary campaign for the Welsh language to be given an official role in Wales's education system. For instance, Iwan Jenkyn, the headmaster of Cefnfaes British School in Bethesda and a member of the Society for Utilizing the Welsh Language, organised celebrations for St David's Day involving his pupils in c. 1890. However, such activities appear to have been rare in that period. The Welsh department, created in the Board of Education of England and Wales in 1907, began to encourage schools to organise celebrations in the early 1910s. Schools in the Rhondda in 1914 marked the occasion with marching, patriotic songs, Welsh dancing, performances, reciting poetry and traditional Welsh costumes. This was praised by T.W Berry, an education official in the area, as teaching children "the full significance of what is meant by 'A Welshman'"

The Welsh Department's pamphlet Patriotism: Suggestions to Local Education Authorities & Teachers in Wales Regarding the Teaching of Patriotism (1915) argued that the teaching of patriotism towards Wales and the wider British Empire was particularly important in the context of the First World War. The pamphlet gave a celebratory account of Welsh history and encouraged a love of Welsh culture. Though it did briefly mention that Thomas Picton had damaged his reputation by allowing torture when Governor of Trinidad. The pamphlet emphasised British unity with various positive comments about the English, Scottish and Irish; including numerous mentions of William Shakespeare. It encouraged children to support Britain's war effort, follow the law and help their parents with chores. The pamphlet was commercially successful and widely praised at the time. Many elementary schools introduced activities for St David's Day in response. These often included lessons on the importance of patriotism, artistic activities and display of the Union Flag. Pupils also often sung the Welsh, British and the other members of the Triple Entente's national anthems. Schools in more Welsh-speaking areas tended to put more emphasis on the language, sometimes using the slogan Nid Cenedl heb Iaith, nid Cymro heb Gymraeg (No nation without a language, no Welshman without Welsh). The nature of the celebrations depended on the preferences of the headmaster.

Schools' interest in celebrating St David's Day declined after the end of the First World War. The Welsh department issued guidance in 1929 encouraging celebrations for the festival and recommending the use of the Welsh language, including in areas where it was little spoken locally. The Welsh department said that some schools had spent a week on St David's Day-related activities, though there is little evidence for this in school records. A 1920s government investigation found St David's Day was widely celebrated in secondary schools. In the post- Second World War period, the event was widely marked in schools with an Eisteddfod, traditional Welsh food and a shortened school day. Martin Johnes, an historian of modern Wales, argues that the day reminded children that they were not living in England and was an aspect of Welsh nationality that monoglot English-speakers could feel included in. At Newport Grammar School, in a locality where some residents considered themselves to be English, both St David's Day and St George's Day were celebrated. The creation of a more centralised education system and devolution of political power to Wales meant that, by the start of the 21st century, schools were increasingly expected to teach subjects relevant to Welsh culture and promote a sense of Welsh patriotism among pupils. Though they were not required to hold celebrations for St David's Day.

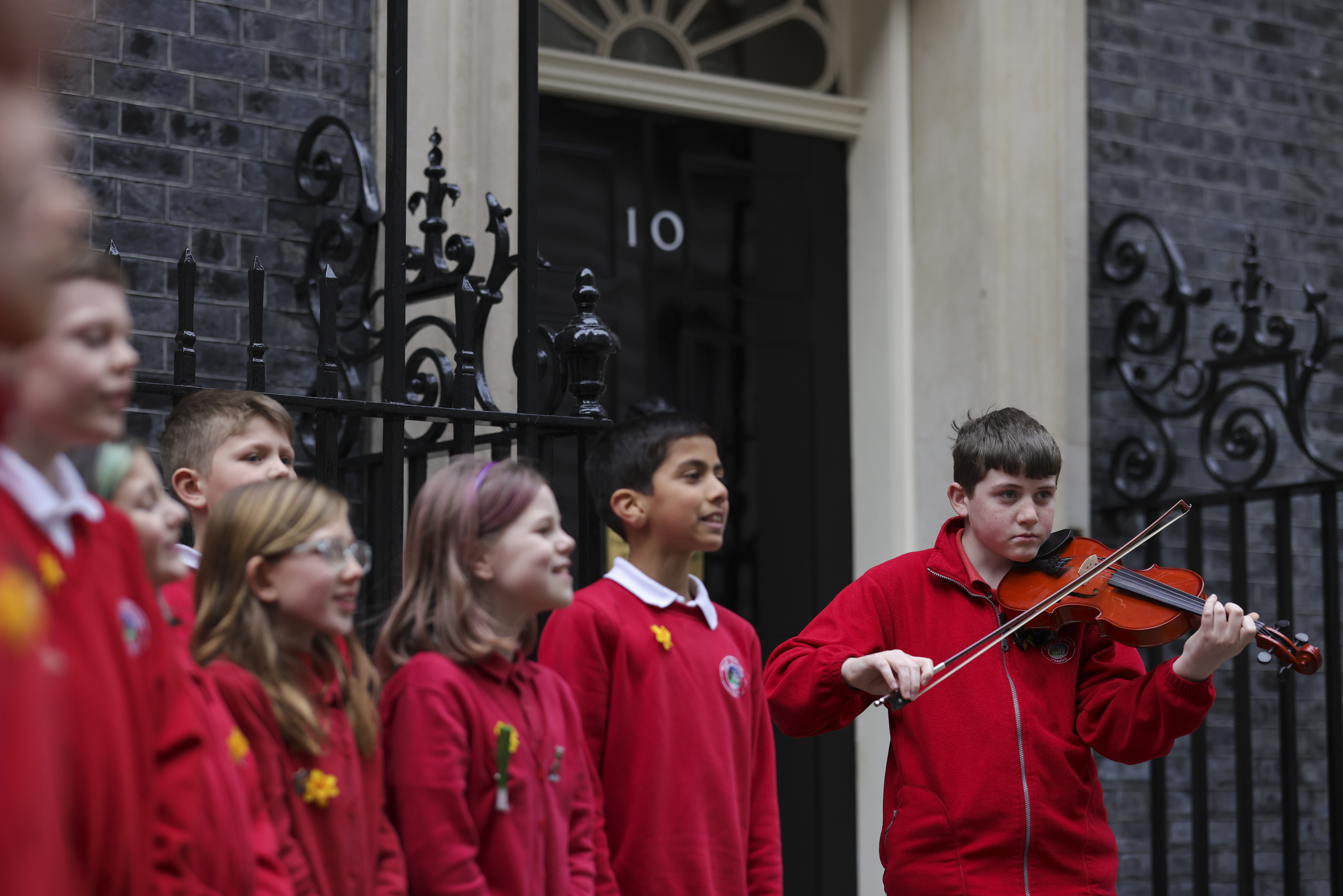
A Welsh school choir performing at the Saint David's Day reception at 10 Downing Street in 2023.

A survey of Welsh secondary schools indicated that at least two thirds of them and the vast majority of schools that responded organised activities for the event in 2002. This tended to involve a series of performances by pupils, influenced by the concept of an Eisteddfod, in which children often competed to win points on behalf of their school house or form class. The Welsh language tended to be used widely in performances at both Welsh-medium and, to a lesser extent, English-medium schools. They usually involved the younger children and sometimes the entire school. Nigel Exell, who conducted the survey, suggests that the lesser participation of older pupils may have reflected their greater academic responsibilities and the reluctance of teenagers to appear on stage. The display of symbols of Wales, the most popular of which were daffodils, was common but less widespread at Welsh-medium schools and in the more Welsh-speaking areas. Children were frequently given permission not to wear their school uniforms; the wearing of Welsh rugby jerseys was particularly common in the South Wales valleys. Exell comments that this may have reflected the strength of rugby culture in those regions. The singing of the Welsh national anthem was common, especially in the valleys.

=== Celebrations elsewhere ===
Disneyland Paris organises yearly events to celebrate Saint David's Day, which includes a Welsh-themed week, fireworks, parades, and Disney characters dressed in traditional Welsh attire. Washington, DC holds a St. David's Day congressional reception at the United States Capitol in honour of the First Minister of Wales' biannual visits. While the Los Angeles St. David's Day Festival – National Day of Wales is the largest annual event of its kind in the United States, encompassing an eisteddfod, Celtic marketplace, classes, and a concert.

== Proposals for a public holiday ==
Unlike Saint Patrick's Day in Ireland, Saint David's Day is not a national holiday, though there is strong support for it becoming a bank holiday in Wales. In the past, schools have taken a half-day holiday, which continues in some parts of Wales. Saint David's Day is also celebrated in expatriate Welsh communities outside the UK. Cross-party support resulted in the National Assembly for Wales voting unanimously to make Saint David's Day a public holiday in 2000. A poll conducted for Saint David's Day in 2006 found that 87% of people in Wales wanted it to be a bank holiday, with 65% prepared to sacrifice a different bank holiday to achieve this. A petition in 2007 to make Saint David's Day a bank holiday was rejected by the office of the British Prime Minister Tony Blair. In 2022 Gwynedd County Council voted to make the day a paid public holiday for their staff.

== See also ==
- Saint Andrew's Day
- Saint George's Day
- Saint Patrick's Day

== Sources ==
- Exell, Nigel (March 2006). "Observance of St David's Day in Secondary Schools in Wales: A National Survey, 2002". Contemporary Wales. 18 (1): 72–90 – via Ingenta Connect.
- Grigg, Russell (June 2018). "'You Should Love Your Country and Should Ever Strive to be Worthy of Your Fatherland': Identity, British Values and St David's Day in Elementary Schools in Wales, c.1885–1920". The Welsh History Review / Cylchgrawn Hanes Cymru. 29 (1): 99–125. doi:10.16922/whr.29.1.5. ISSN 0083-792X.
- Johnes, Martin (2012). Wales since 1939. Manchester University Press. ISBN 978-0-7190-8667-0.
- Jones, Gareth Elwyn (1982). Controls and Conflicts in Welsh Secondary Education, 1889–1944. University of Wales Press. ISBN 0708308147.
