= Afon Cwmnantcol =

River in North Wales

Coordinates: 52.82071°N 4.0743°W

River Cwmnantcol
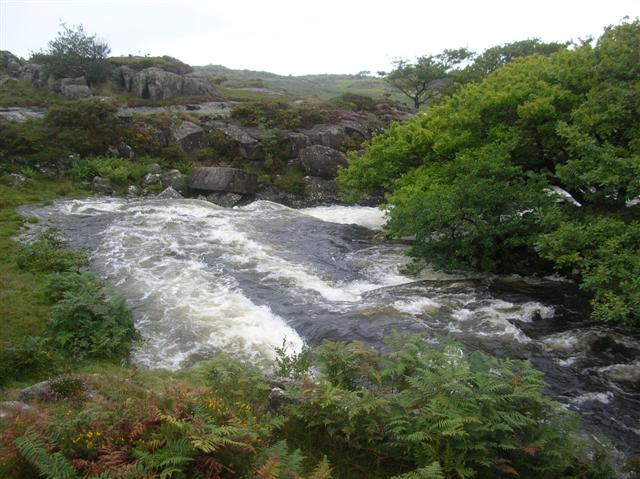
- Native name: Afon Cwmnantcol (Welsh)

The River Cwmnantcol (Afon Cwmnantcol in Welsh) is a river in North Wales.

It is about 3 miles (5 kilometres) long and has its source at the head of Cwm Nantcol below Rhinog Fawr and Y Llethr. It flows north-west from its source and joins the Afon Artro at Pentre Gwynfryn.
