= Afon Ysgethin =

River in Gwynedd, Wales

Coordinates: 52°46′36″N 4°06′53″W

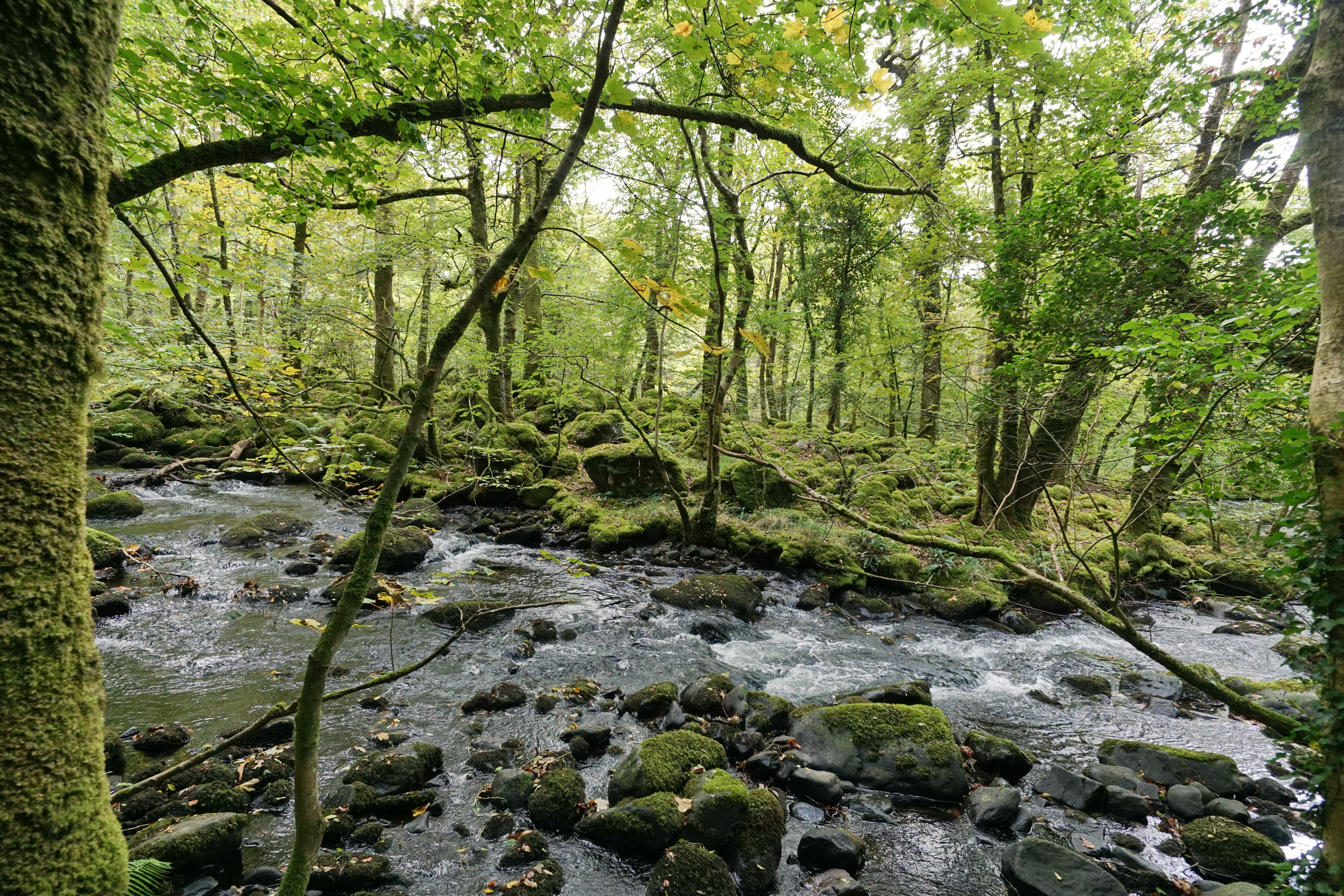
- Afon Ysgethin in Coed Cors y Gedol

Location
- Country: Wales
- County: Gwynedd

Physical characteristics
- Source
  - location: Dyffryn Ardudwy
- Mouth
  - location: Tal-y-bont, Dyffryn Ardudwy

The Afon Ysgethin is a short river in Gwynedd, Wales. Flowing entirely within Snowdonia National Park, it rises beneath the peaks of Y Llethr and Diffwys in the Rhinogydd mountain range and runs in a generally WSW direction towards Cardigan Bay. Its upper reaches are crossed by two old stone bridges: Pont Scethin and Pont Fadog. Below the latter, the river flows through the Cors y Gedol woodland, a temperate rain forest with a diverse flora and fauna.

== Llyn Bodlyn reservoir and Pont Scethin ==
West of the ridge connecting Y Llethr and Diffwys, headwater streams flow into a small upper lake, Llyn Dulyn, and Llyn Bodlyn reservoir. Originally a natural lake, Llyn Bodlyn was enlarged in 1894 to provide Barmouth with water.

The river emerging from the reservoir is crossed by a historic track at Pont Scethin. This old stone arch bridge ("probably 18th century") was used by packhorses and drovers on a once important route leading from Harlech to London. The scheduled monument is of national importance "for its potential to enhance our knowledge of post-medieval transport techniques". Its single arch is relatively high: The bridge was built so the usually small river could be crossed even when flooding. The footway is just under two metres wide at the narrowest point. The low parapets (circa 50 cm high) consist of large, elongated blocks of stone, which must have been quite difficult to transport.

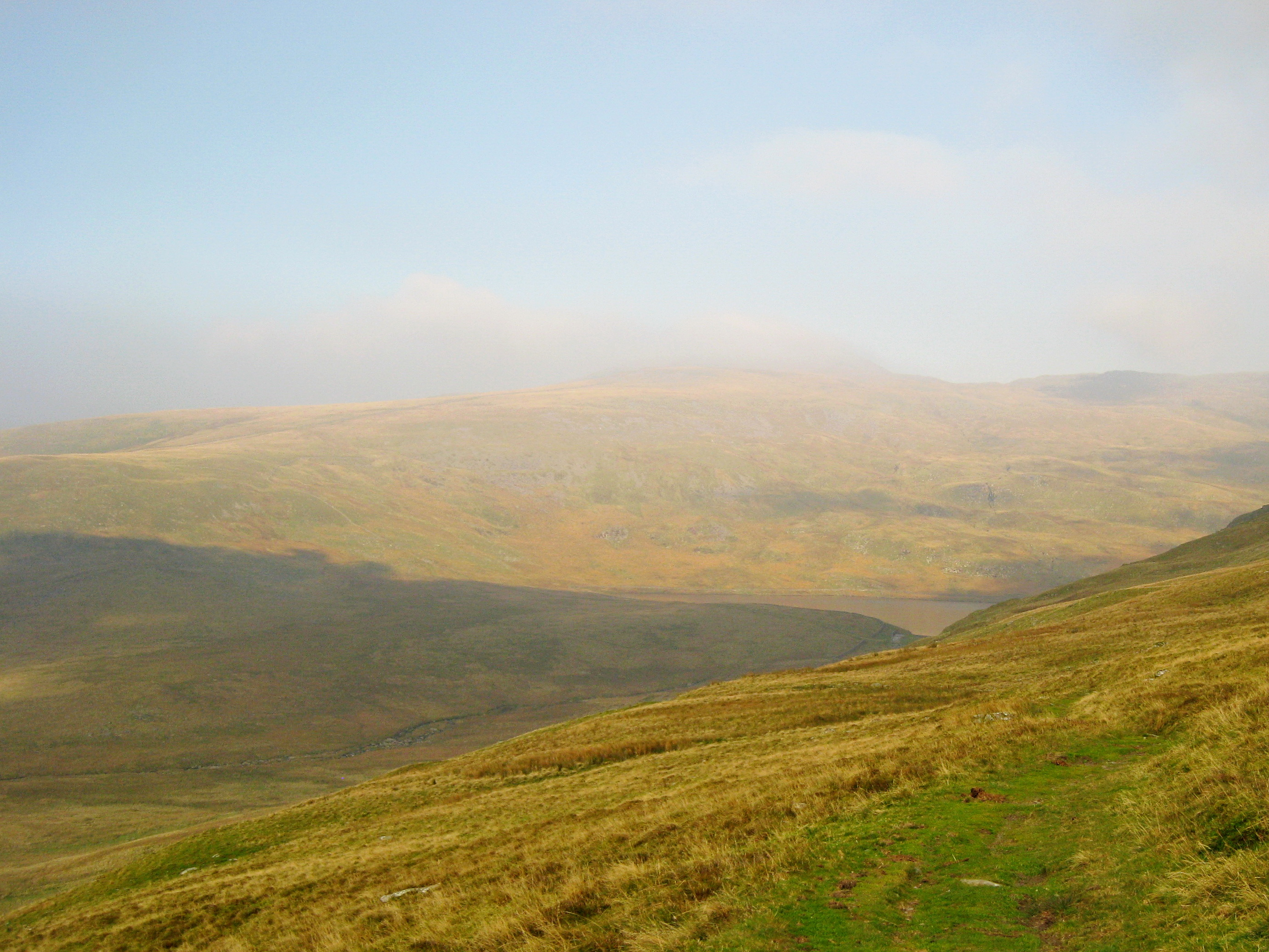
Looking down on Llyn Bodlyn and Afon Ysgethin from the historic track

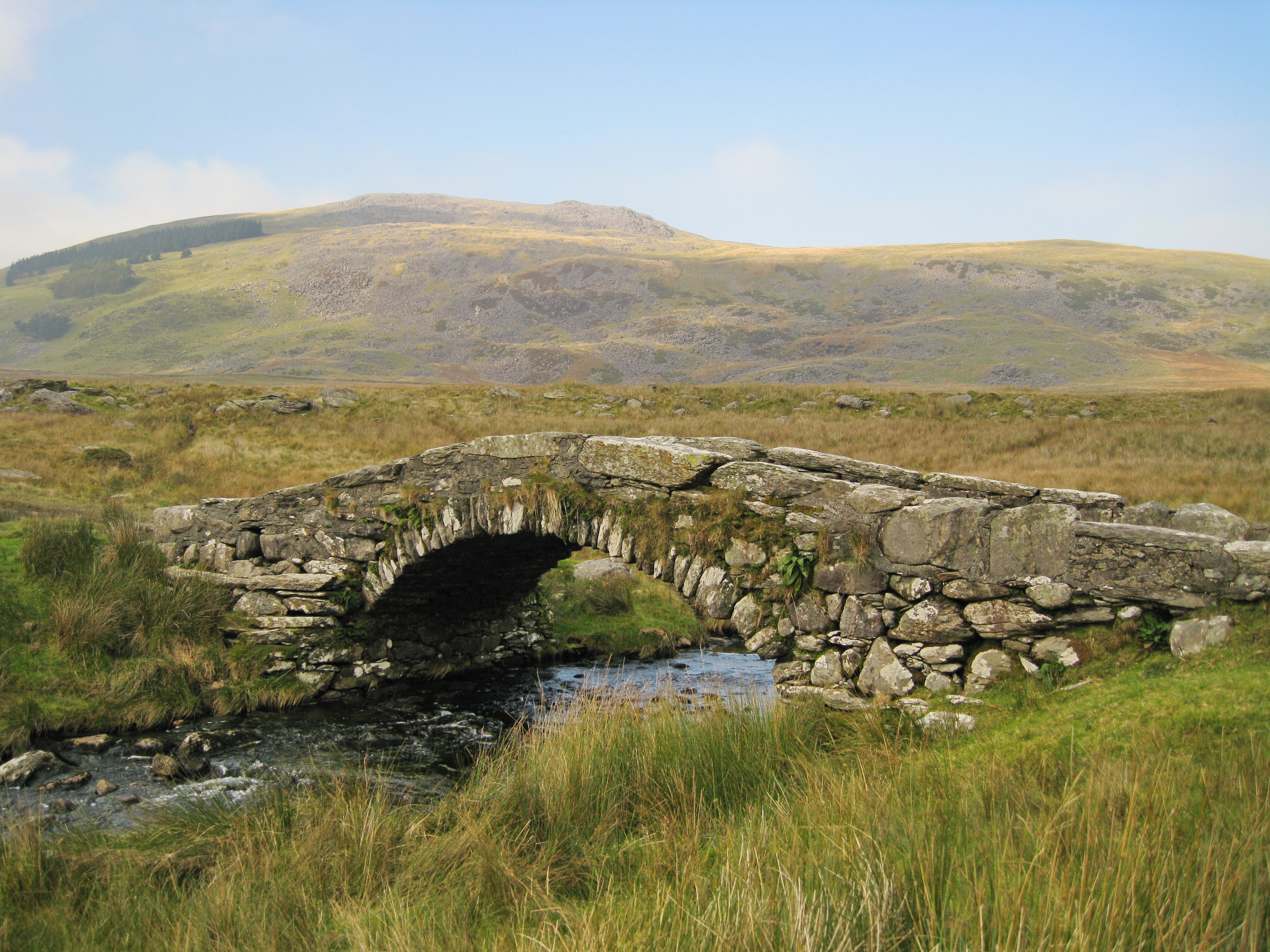
Pont Scethin and Moelfre

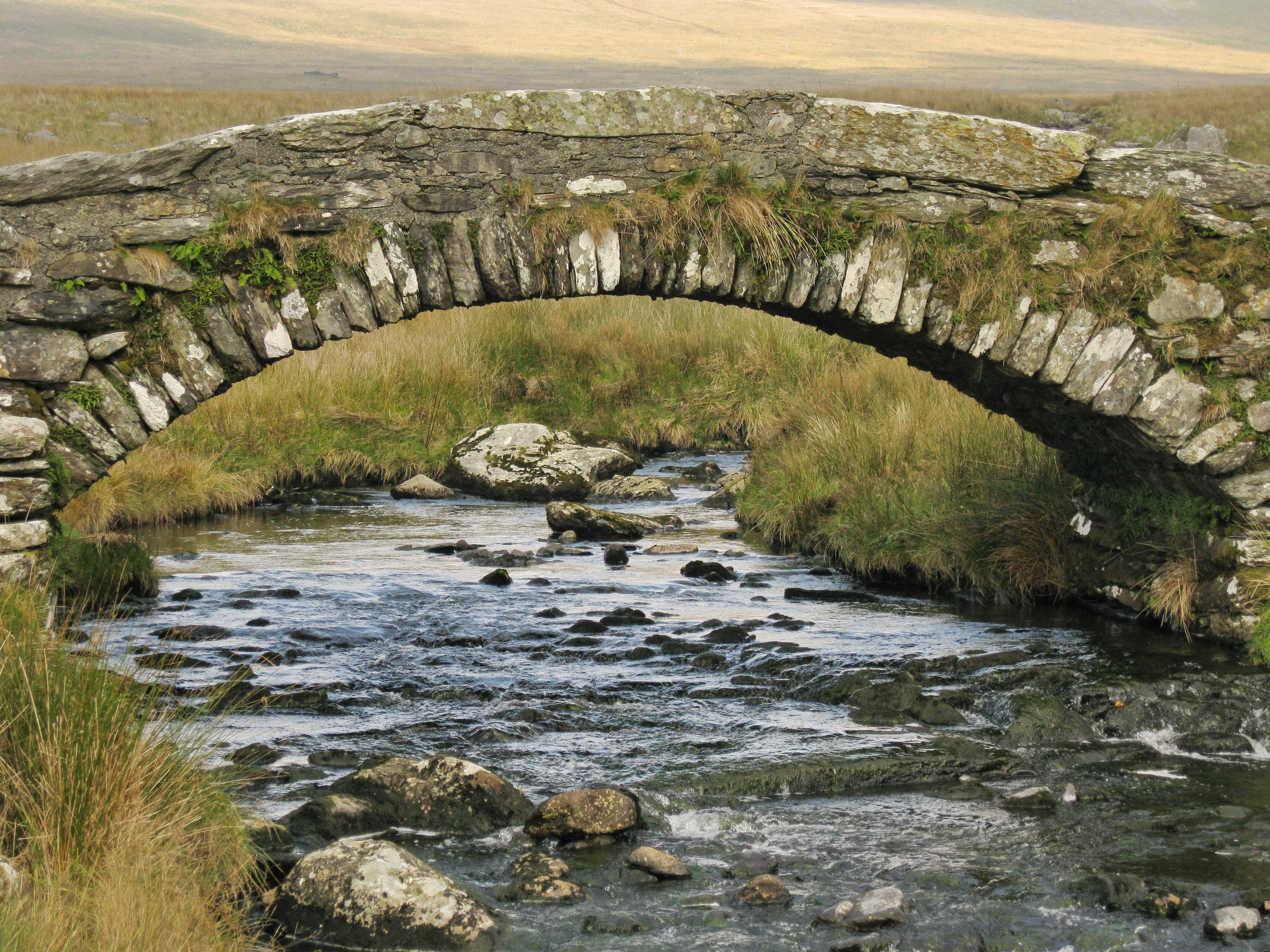
Afon Ysgethin and the elegant arch of the bridge

== Pont Fadog ==
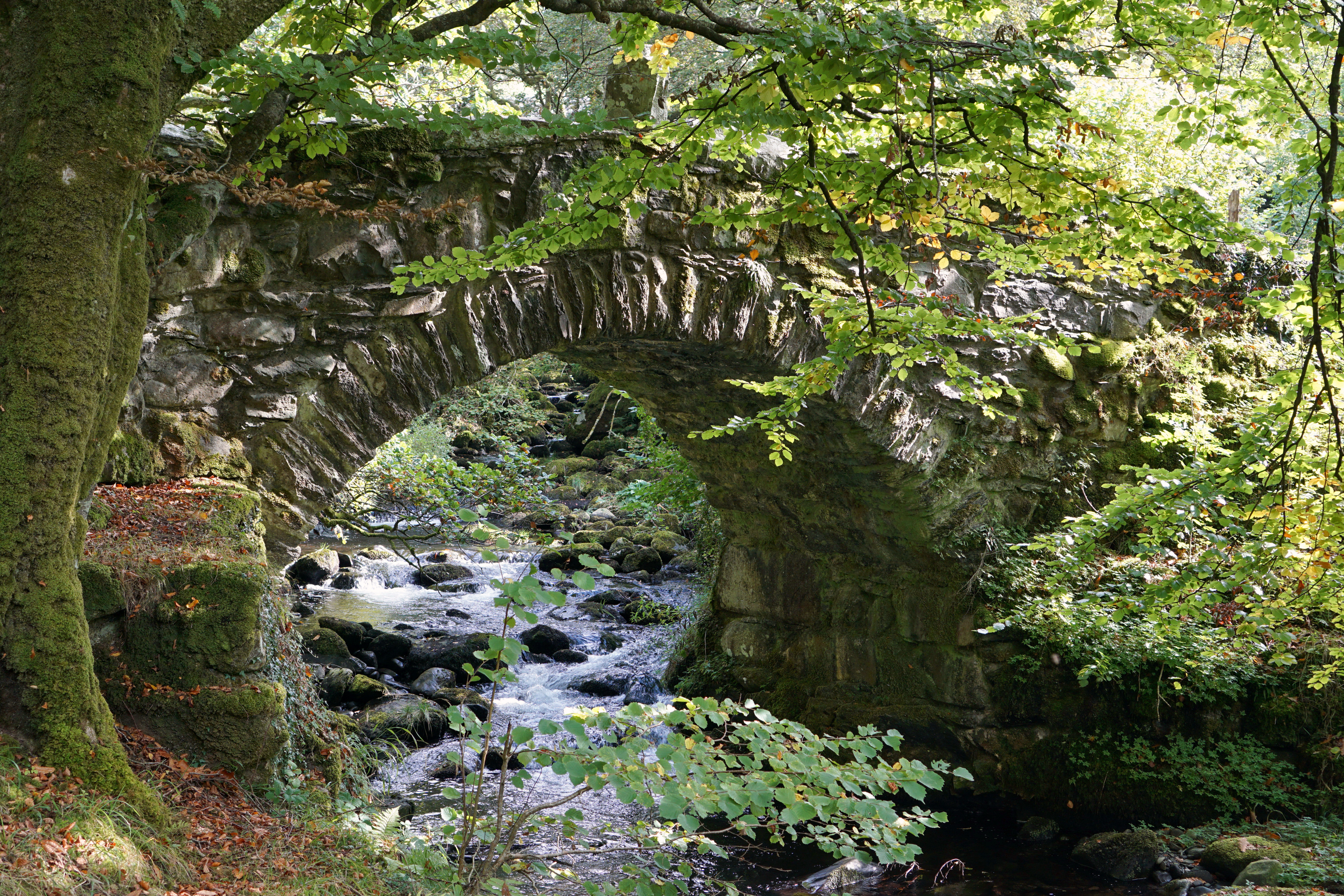
Pont Fadog

A further 3 km downstream, the river is crossed by Pont Fadog. This Grade II listed roadbridge is on the original medieval drovers' route to Bontddu and Dolgellau. It is built of rubble masonry, with a single segmental arch and low parapet walls.

At the apex of the arch, an inscription on a stone tablet states that the bridge was improved in 1762 by a mason called H. Edward, who was commissioned by William Vaughan. Vaughan was a member of the powerful owner family of nearby Cors y Gedol Hall (see Dyffryn Ardudwy).

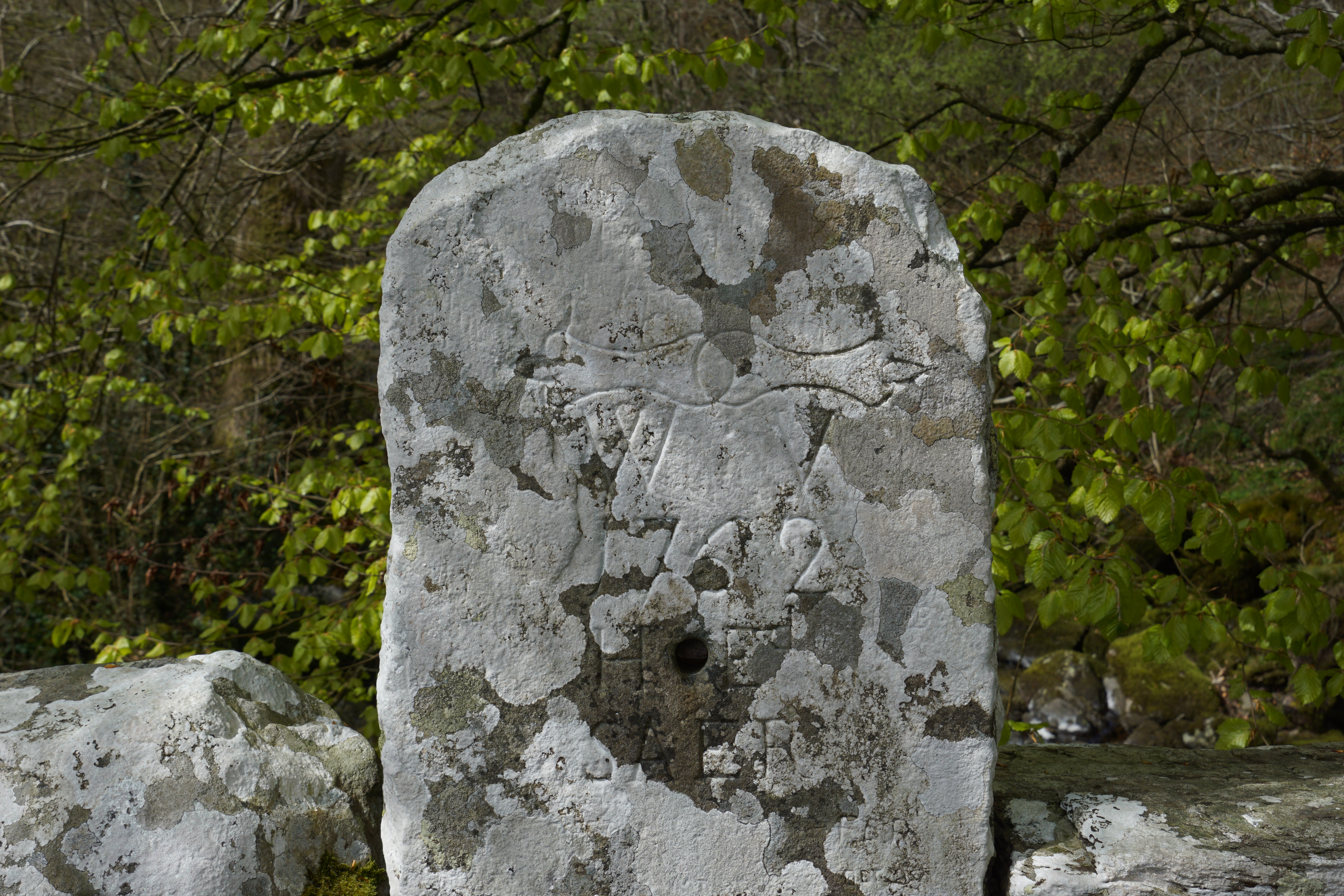

W V
1762
H Ed
SAER ('mason')

== Coed Cors y Gedol ==
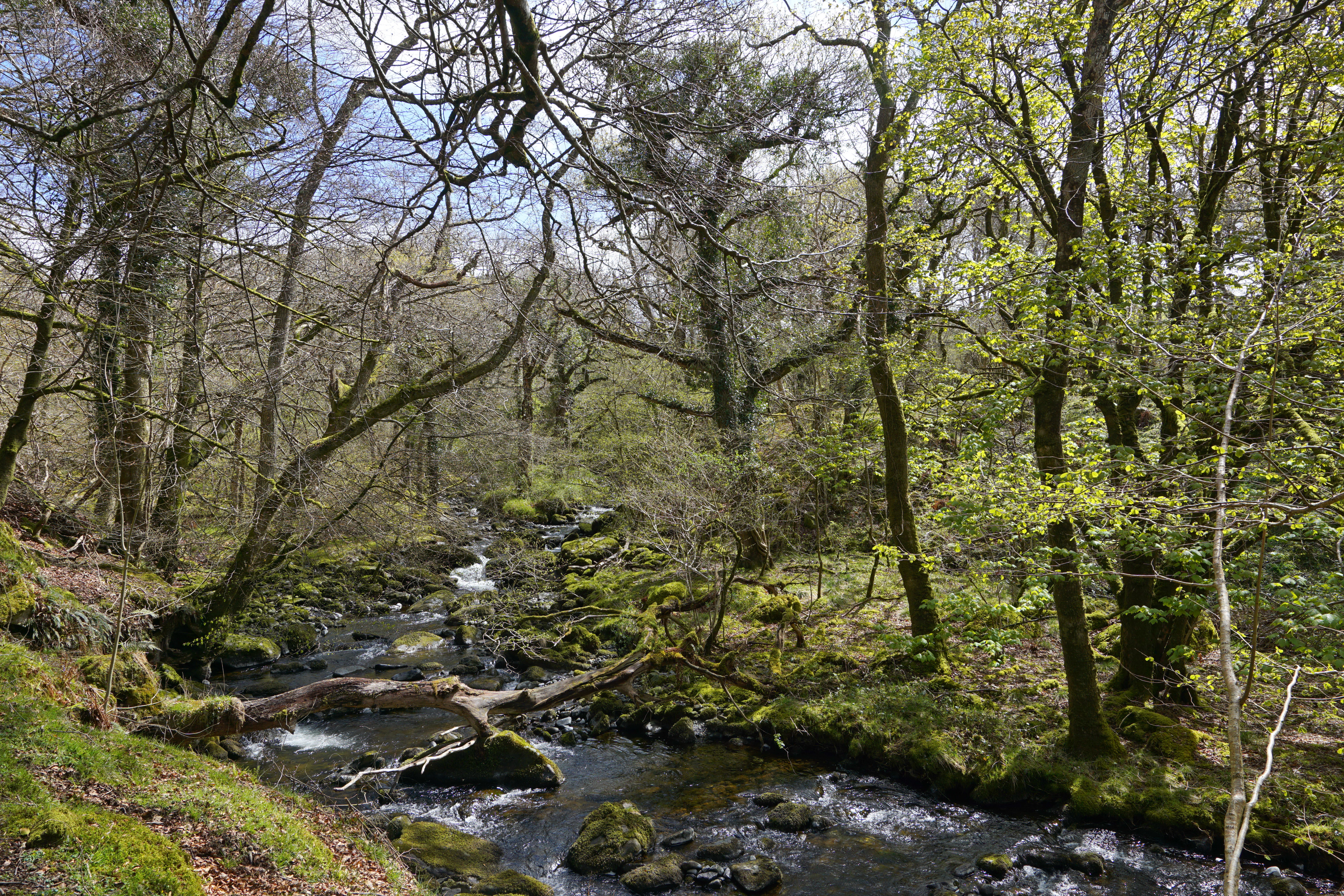
Coed Cors y Gedol, a temperate rain forest

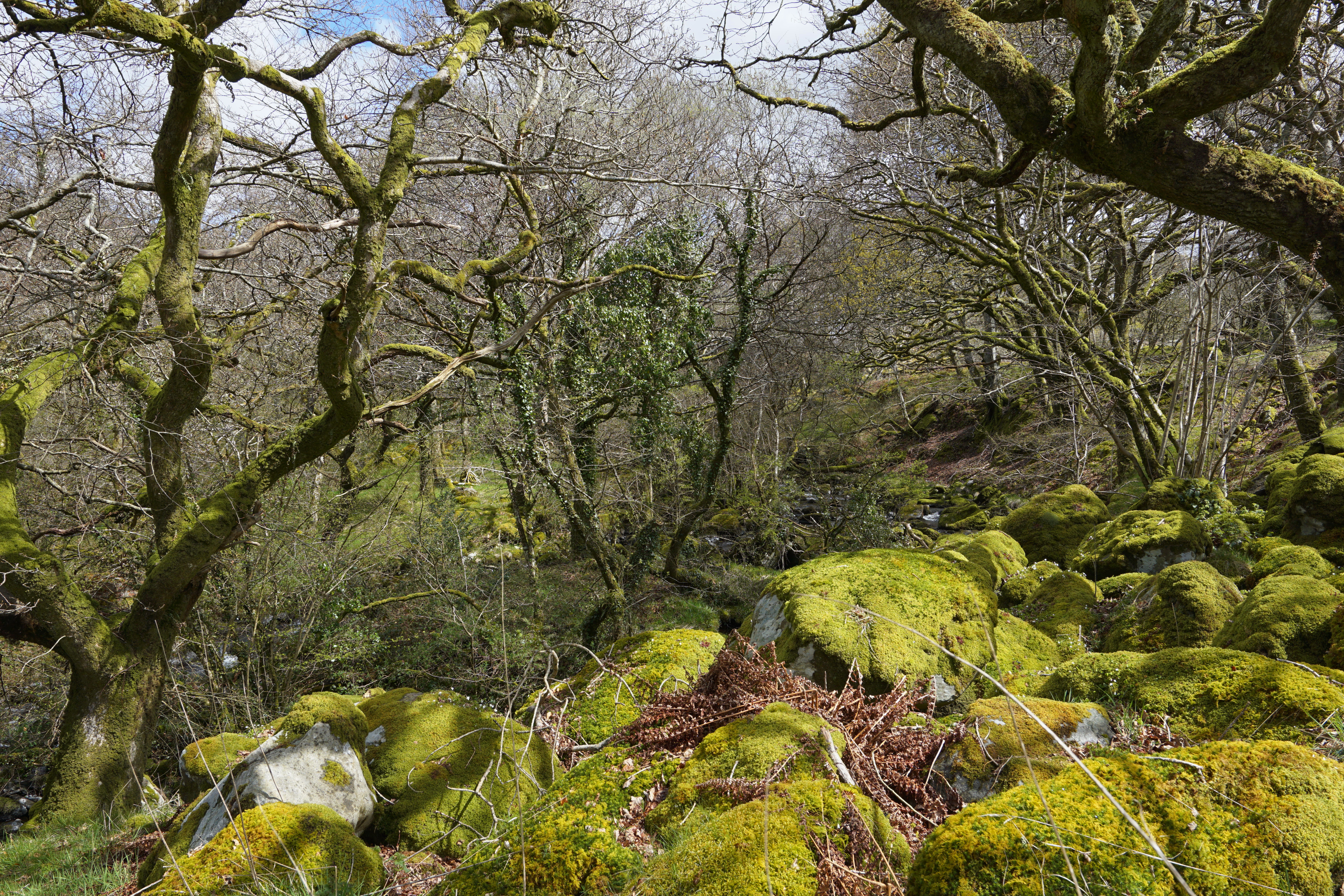
Its flora includes over 90 species of mosses and liverworts

Below Pont Fadog, the Afon Ysgethin enters a narrower valley in Coed Cors y Gedol (or Cors-y-gedol; coed: 'wood'). This is a Site of Special Scientific Interest: 56.3 hectares of sessile oak woodland that is described as temperate rain forest, with an abundance of ferns, lichens, mosses and liverworts.

A mixture of habitats, which is partly due to the river, and neutral soils support a diverse flora including wood anemone, ramsons, bluebells, enchanter's nightshade, dog's mercury, more unusual plants like hay-scented buckler fern, great horsetail, wood millet and globeflower, and over 90 species of mosses and liverworts. Some unusual lichens are riparian species associated with the Afon Ysgethin. Their presence "reflects the unacidified, unpolluted quality of the river". The fauna includes badgers, bats, and bird species such as wood warbler, redstart and pied flycatcher.

However, some parts of the woodland need management to become more diverse, and there are too many non-native beech trees, which are to be replaced by native trees such as oak and hazel.

== Tal-y-bont ==
After traversing Coed Cors y Gedol, circa 2 km from Pont Fadog, the river flows past the village of Tal-y-bont. Near the "Ysgethin Inn", which was once a fulling mill, it is crossed by a rather narrow bridge carrying the A496 road; a further 500 m downstream, by the Cambrian Coast railway. After another 1200 m, the Afon Ysgethin flows into Cardigan Bay.

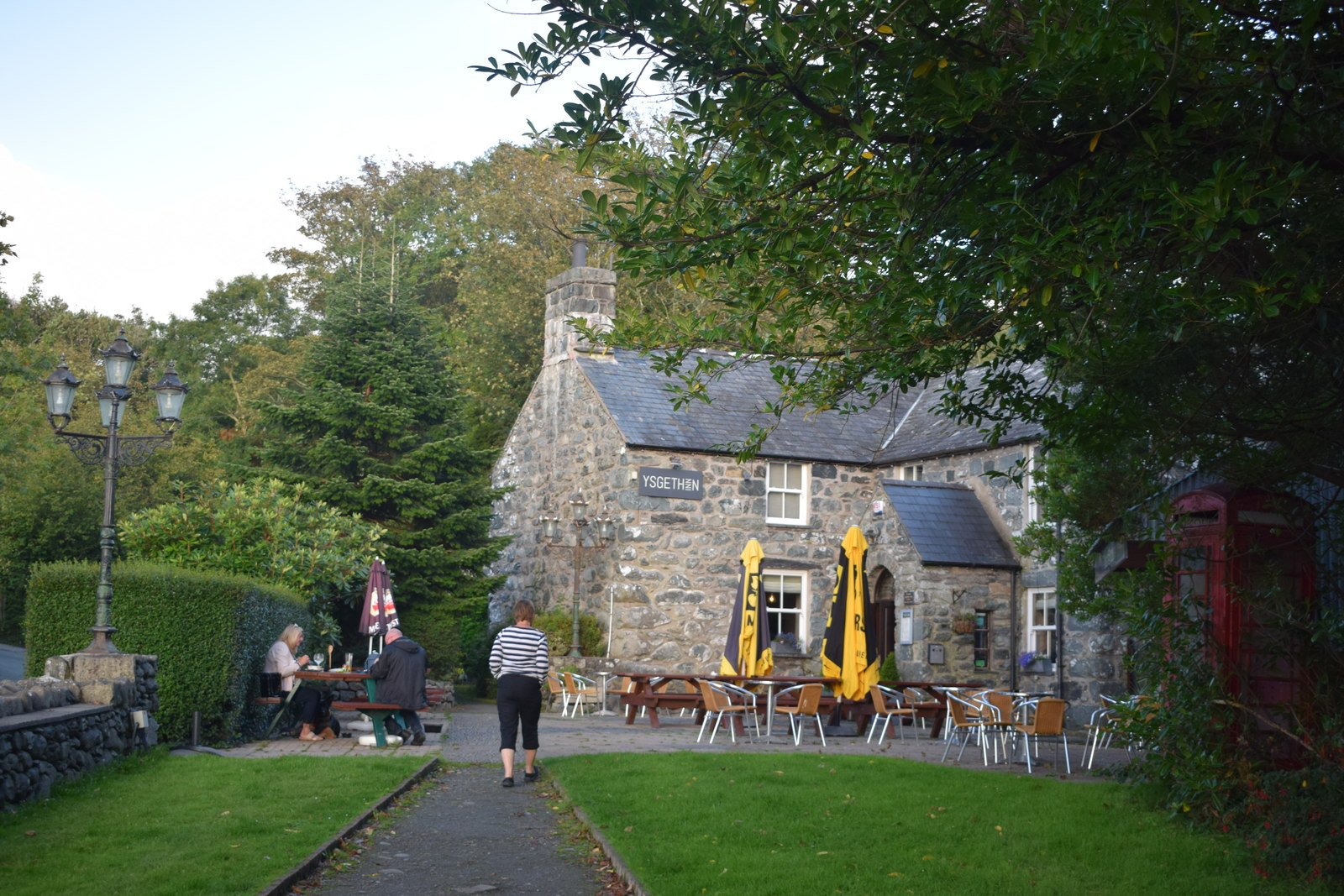
The "Ysgethin Inn" was once a fulling mill

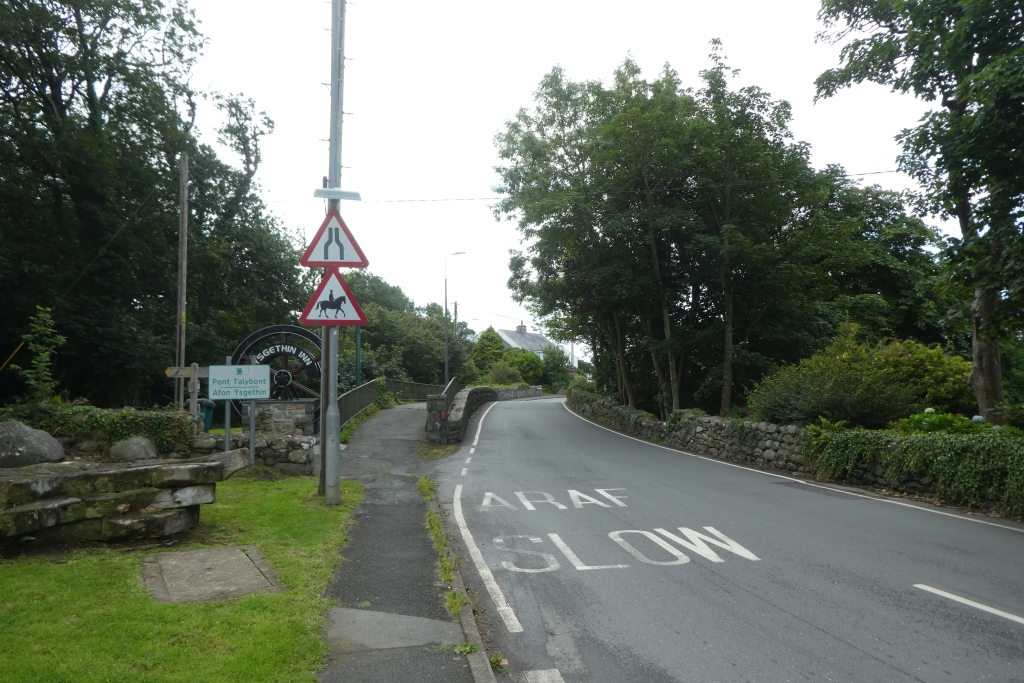
Narrow "Pont Talybont", carrying the A496 road

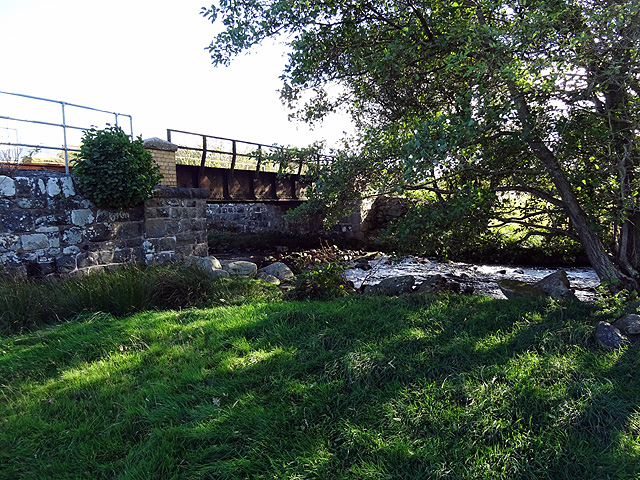
Railway bridge over Afon Ysgethin, close to the coast
