= Diffwys West Top =

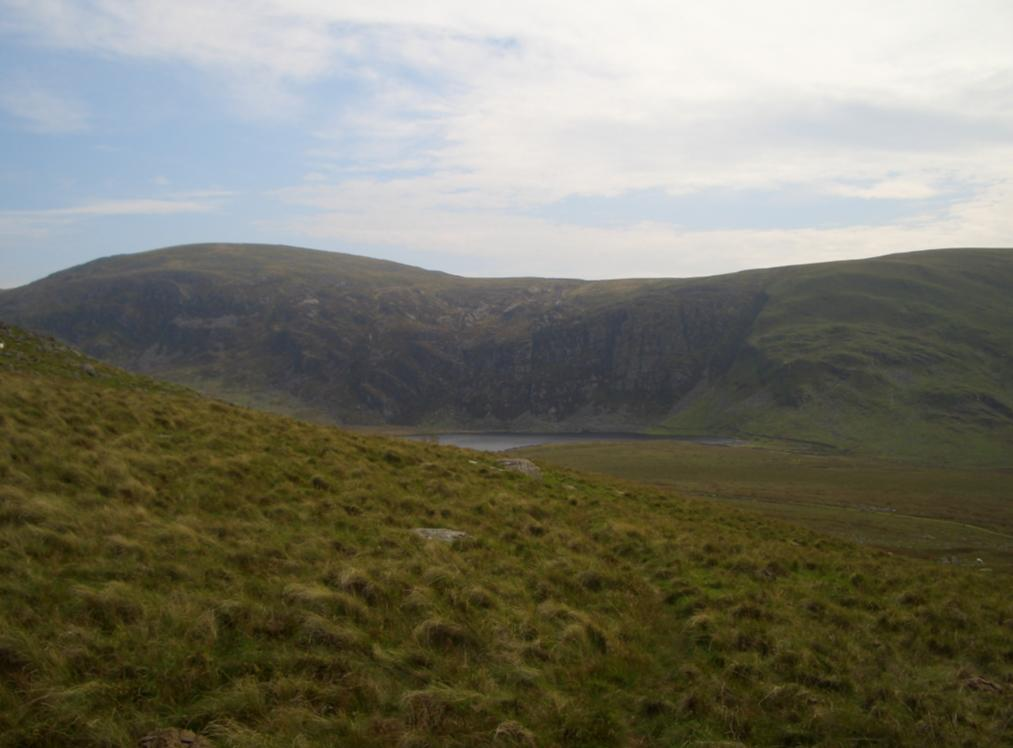
- Diffwys (left) and Diffwys West Top (right) with Llyn and Craig Bodlyn

Highest point
- Elevation: 642 m (2,106 ft)
- Prominence: 21 m (69 ft)
- Parent peak: Y Llethr
- Listing: sub Hewitt, Nuttall
- Coordinates: 52°47′29″N 3°59′14″W

Geography
- Location within Gwynedd
- Location: Gwynedd, Wales
- Parent range: Rhinogydd
- OS grid: SH661234
- Topo map: OS Landranger 124

Diffwys West Top is a top of Diffwys in Snowdonia, North Wales, near Barmouth and forms part of the Rhinogydd. It is a grassy summit found on the west ridge. The summit is marked with a pile of stones, below which is the crags of Craig Bodlyn and the glacial lake, Llyn Bodlyn. Moelfre is to the north.
