= Crib-y-rhiw =

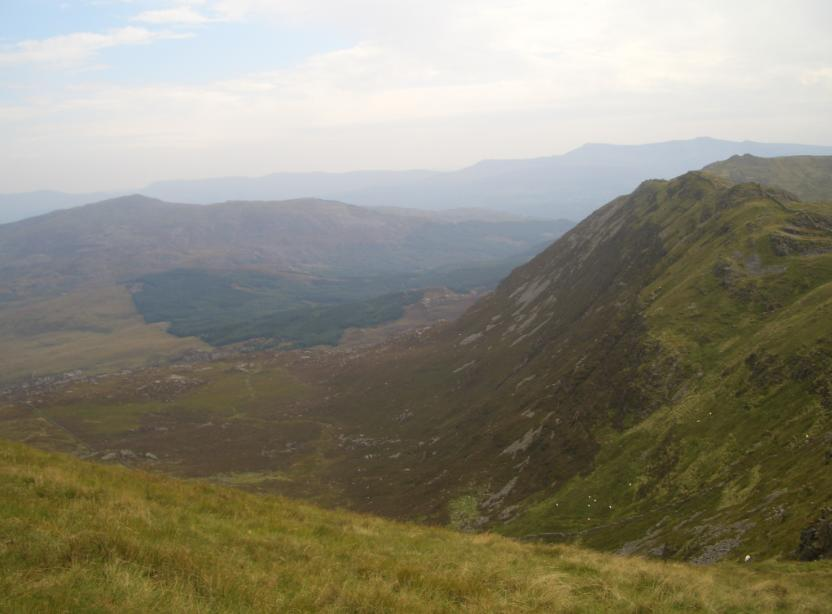
- The Crib-y-rhiw ridge with Y Garn (left)

Highest point
- Elevation: 679 m (2,228 ft)
- Prominence: 27 m (89 ft)
- Parent peak: Y Llethr
- Listing: Nuttall
- Coordinates: 52°48′46.8″N 3°59′9.6″W

Naming
- English translation: ridge of the slope
- Language of name: Welsh

Geography
- Location: Gwynedd, Wales
- Parent range: Rhinogydd
- OS grid: SH661258
- Topo map: OS Landranger 124

Crib-y-rhiw is a top of Y Llethr and a ridge in the Rhinogydd of Snowdonia, north Wales. The summit straddles a thin ridge connecting Y Llethr to Diffwys.
