= River Wnion =

River in Gwynedd, Wales

Coordinates: 52°45′11″N 3°54′40″W

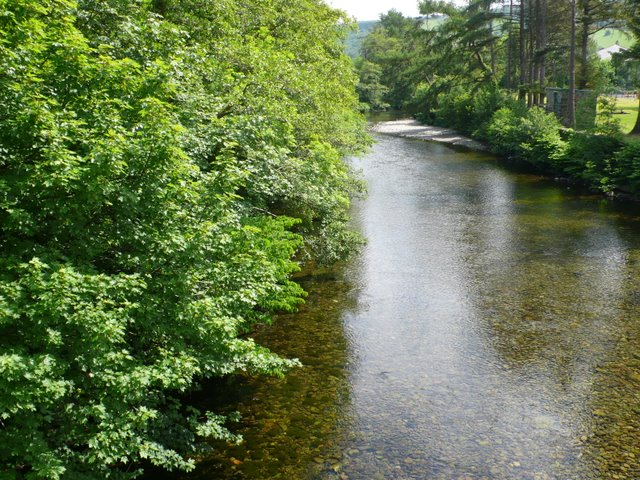
Wnion in Dolgellau

The River Wnion is a river in the southeast of Gwynedd, Wales. It begins high on the slopes of Aran Benllyn about five miles south of Llanuwchllyn and flows south-west into the River Mawddach near Cymer Abbey. It flows past several villages, including Rhyd-y-main and Bontnewydd, where a bridge crosses over the river that dates from the 18th century. It then flows to Dolgellau where another locally famous bridge, known as "Y Bont Fawr". Its total length is approximately 12 miles.

The river may get its name from 'White' which turned from "gwyn" (white) into "gwn" (gun); indeed, there is a place called 'Pennar(th) Gwynion' in the vicinity, near Hengwrt.
