= Y Garn (Rhinogydd) =

Coordinates: 52.78891°N 3.92623°W

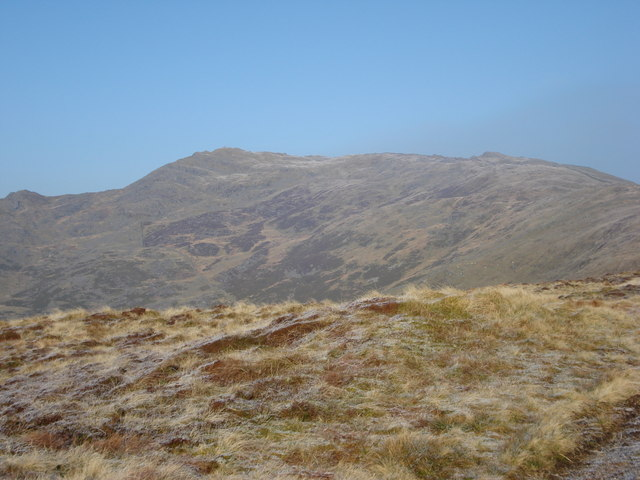
- Y Garn from the south

Highest point
- Elevation: 629 m (2,064 ft)
- Prominence: 315 m (1,033 ft)
- Parent peak: Y Llethr
- Listing: Marilyn, Hewitt, Nuttall

Naming
- English translation: the cairn
- Language of name: Welsh
- Pronunciation: Welsh: [ə ˈɡarn]

Geography
- Location: Gwynedd, United Kingdom
- Parent range: Rhinogydd
- OS grid: SH702230

Climbing
- Easiest route: walk

Y Garn is a mountain in the southern Snowdonia, Wales, north of Dolgellau. It is an outlier of the Rhinogydd range, rising above the Coed-y-Brenin forest and the Rhaeadr Du waterfalls. An abandoned gold mine lies on its eastern slopes and Diffwys (750m) can be seen to the north from the summit.
