= Afon Eden =

River in Gwynedd, Wales

Coordinates: 52°48′N 3°54′W

Afon Eden River Eden
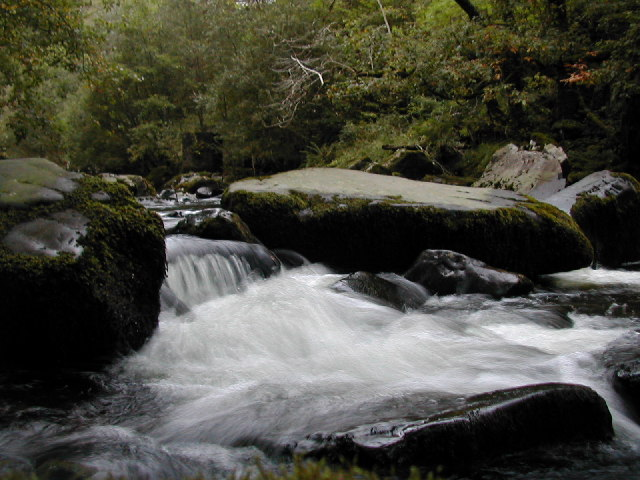
- Afon Eden near Coed-y-Brenin
- Native name: Afon Eden (Welsh)

Physical characteristics
- Mouth
  - location: Ganllwyd
- Length: 10 km (6.2 mi)

Afon Eden is a tributary river than runs into the Afon Mawddach in Gwynedd, Wales. It is a protected river because it is one of the few breeding grounds for freshwater pearl mussels.
