= Rhinogydd =

Mountain range near Harlech, Wales

The Rhinogydd (a Welsh plural form, often anglicised as Rhinogs and also known by the alternative Welsh plural Rhinogau) are a range of mountains located east of Harlech in North Wales. The name Rhinogydd derives from the names of two of the more famous peaks, Rhinog Fawr and Rhinog Fach, although the greatest elevation in the range is reached by Y Llethr, 756 m (2,480 feet).

Foel Penolau, the northernmost summit of the range, was promoted to a Hewitt in 2018 following a new survey.

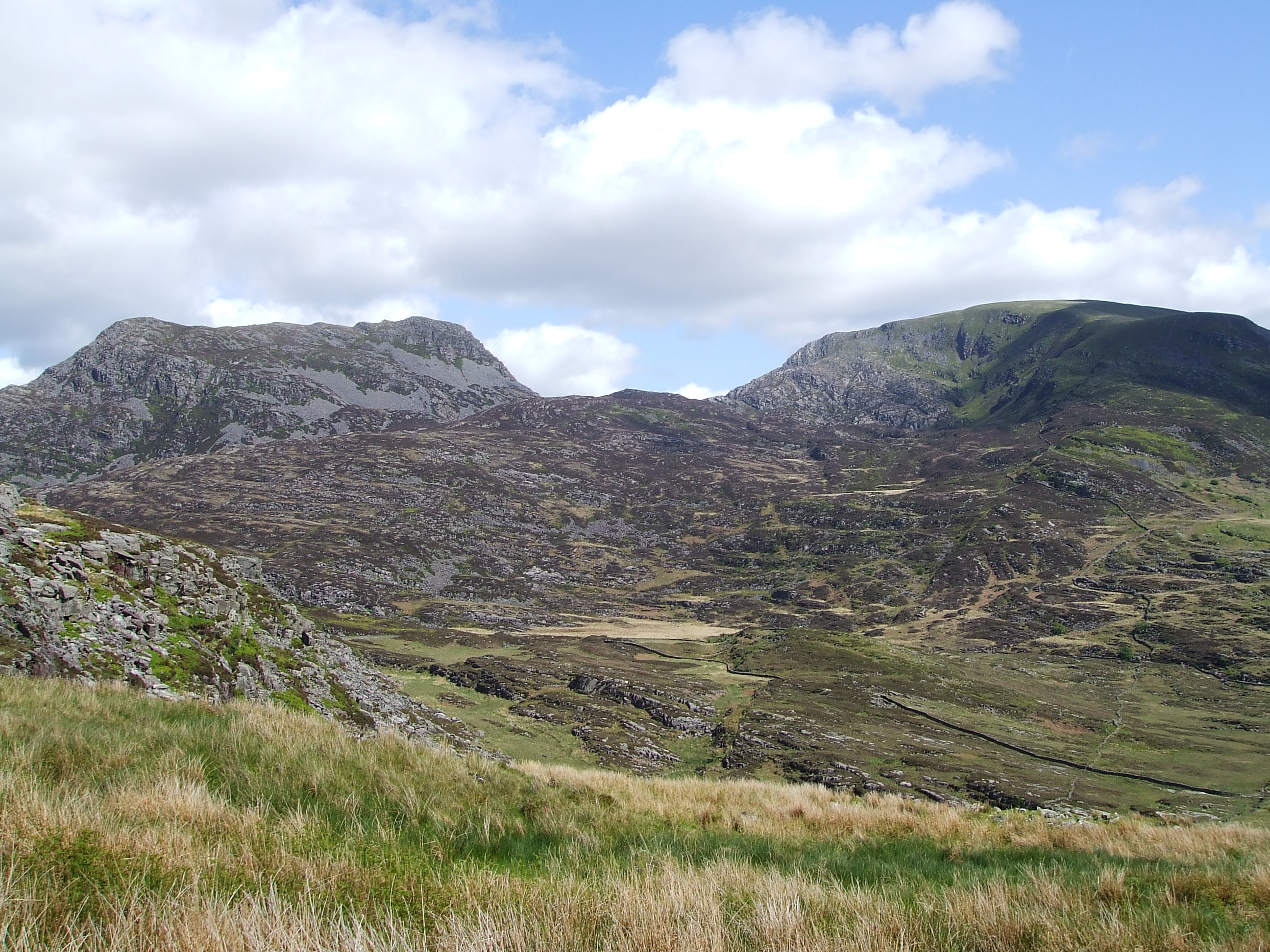
Rhinog Fach and Y Llethr from the slopes of Rhinog Fawr

The Rhinogydd are notably rocky and heather-clad towards the northern end of the range, especially around Rhinog Fawr, Rhinog Fach and towards Moel Ysgyfarnogod. The southern end, around Y Llethr, Diffwys and the Ysgethin Valley has a softer, grassy character.

A population of feral goats are in the range. Over 30 km² are protected as a Special Area of Conservation and a National Nature Reserve.

== Geology ==
The Rhinogydd are formed of hard sedimentary rocks of Cambrian age which occur as a major anticlinal structure known to geologists as the Harlech Dome. This structure which originated during the Caledonian Orogeny (mountain-building period) extends from Cadair Idris in the south to Blaenau Ffestiniog in the north. Its erosion by successive glaciations has left the valleys and peaks of the Rhinogydd visible today. The core of the area is formed from the hard-wearing greywackes of the Rhinog Formation. The formation also contains and is overlain by some siltstones and mudstones which form a broken zone of softer scenery around the periphery of the area's rugged core. In places, swarms of dolerite dykes cut through the country rocks in a generally northwest–southeast direction. Much of the lower ground is mantled by glacial till, a legacy of the last glaciation.

=== History of geological investigations ===
The geology of the area was first characterised by Adam Sedgwick and Roderick Murchison in 1835. The Geological Survey began work in the area in 1846 and their first maps were published in 1855. With the discovery of gold in the area in 1846 the state of geological knowledge increased dramatically. At least a dozen major publications appeared between 1844 and 1939.

== Hillwalking in the Rhinogydd ==
The Rhinogydd are far less well known than the areas in the north of the Snowdonia National Park, such as the Glyderau, Carneddau and the Snowdon massif itself. This is due to the rugged nature of the landscape in the Rhinogydd and the fame of Snowdon as the highest peak in Wales. The Rhinog mountains are popular with hillwalkers looking for a more isolated, wilder walking experience.

The peaks of the range are most easily accessed from the west side. Two valleys - Cwm Nantcol ('valley of the Nantcol (stream)') and Cwm Bychan ('small valley') - lead deep into the mountains and may be reached from the village of Llanbedr.

The most popular walking route in this area begins at the Roman Steps at 52°51′16.76″N 4°0′18.43″W, which leads from Cwm Bychan through Bwlch Tyddiad and around Rhinog Fawr. Despite the name, these steps are not Roman and are in fact the well preserved remains of a medieval packhorse trail leading from Chester to Harlech Castle. At the top of the Roman Steps, the route curves around the eastern end of Rhinog Fawr and enters Cwm Nantcol via Bwlch Drws Ardudwy ('pass of the doorway of Ardudwy'). A different path leads from Cwm Nantcol, passing around the western end of Rhinog Fawr back to Cwm Bychan via Gloywlyn ('gleaming lake'), completing a circular route that can easily be completed in a day.

== Main peaks ==
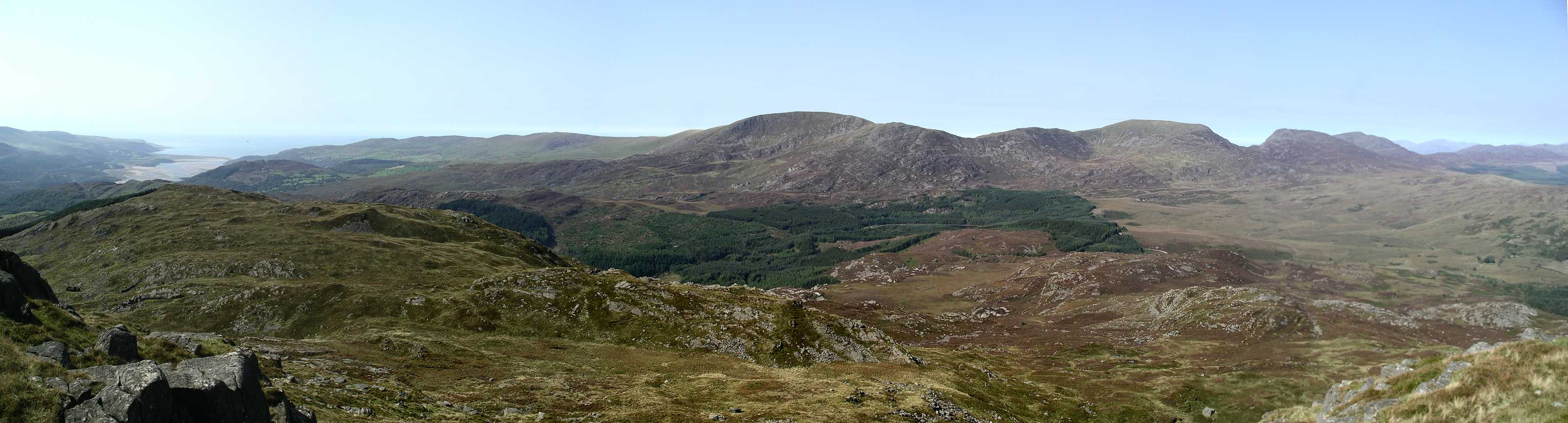
Panorama of the Rhinogau from the summit of Y Garn with the River Mawddach estuary at far left and Diffwys, Crib y Rhiw, Y Llethr, Rhinog Fach and Rhinog Fawr from left to right

The range contains the following Marilyns:

- Y Llethr 756 m
- Rhinog Fawr 720 m
- Rhinog Fach 712 m
- Y Garn 629 m
- Moel Ysgyfarnogod 623 m
- Moelfre 589 m

the following Hewitts:

- Diffwys 750 m
- Foel Penolau 614 m

and the following Nuttalls:

- Crib-y-rhiw 670 m
- Diffwys West Top 642 m
