= Dafydd Davis =

Welsh mountain bike trail builder

Dafydd Davis MBE
- Born: Gwynedd, North Wales
- Occupation: Trail builder
- Awards: MBE (2004); Mountain Bike Hall of Fame inductee (2020)

Dafydd Caradog Davis MBE (born in Gwynedd) is a Welsh mountain bike trail builder, known for the creation of several major UK mountain biking resorts such as Coed-y-Brenin.

== Biography ==
Davis received an MBE in the 2004 Queen's Birthday Honours list for 'services to forestry'.

Davis is an all-round mountain athlete. He has represented his country as a fell runner and is an accomplished rock climber and alpinist. His first significant opportunity to develop mountain bike trails came in the Coed Y Brenin Forest Park in North Wales in the mid-1990s where he was employed from a background of outdoor educational instruction by Forestry Enterprise to develop trails for the new sport of mountain biking. There was limited budget and Davis was innovative in using volunteers, youth organisations and the armed forces to provide the labour needed to build sustainable trails through the forest. The forest park soon developed a reputation for excellent riding conditions, allowing Davis to approach the new Welsh Assembly and gain funding to develop more riding in Coed Y Brenin, as well as trails in four other Welsh forests. This was achieved, and in 2002 the International Mountain Bicycling Association announced Wales to be the world's top mountain biking destination.

In 2004, Davis left Forestry Enterprise and now works as a free-lance trail developer. He has worked extensively in Ireland, England, Israel, Canada and Japan and has developed methods for trail construction that provide sustainable but challenging routes that are durable and accessible to a range of riding abilities.

Davis lives two miles from his home village in the Snowdonia National Park with his wife, Vicky, son Sam and daughter Mollie. He runs, climbs or rides most days.

He was inducted into the Mountain Bike Hall of Fame in 2020 alongside Julien Absalon and Jason McRoy, among others.
