= Moel Ysgyfarnogod =

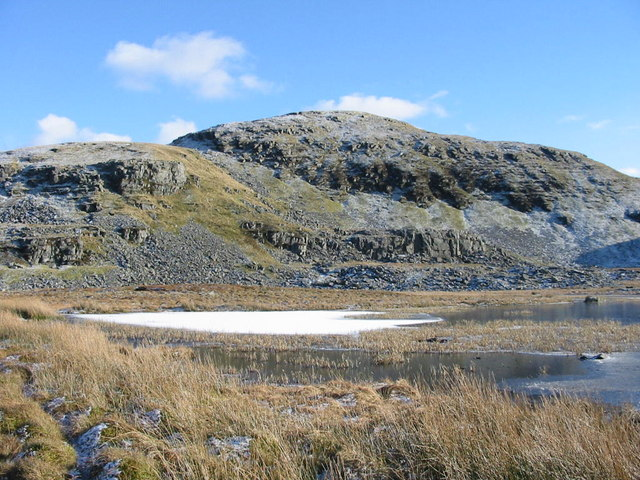
- Moel Ysgyfarnogod from Llyn Dywarchen

Highest point
- Elevation: 623 m (2,044 ft)
- Prominence: 180 m (590 ft)
- Parent peak: Rhinog Fawr
- Listing: Marilyn, Hewitt, Nuttall
- Coordinates: 52°53′28.14″N 3°59′46.21″W

Naming
- English translation: hill of hares
- Language of name: Welsh
- Pronunciation: Welsh: [mɔi̯l ˈəsɡəvarˈnoɡɔd]

Geography
- Location within Gwynedd
- Location: Gwynedd, Wales
- Parent range: Rhinogydd
- OS grid: SH658345
- Topo map: OS Landranger 124

Listed summits of Moel Ysgyfarnogod
Name	Grid ref	Height	Status
Foel Penolau		614 metres (2,014 ft)	sub Hewitt, Nuttall

Moel Ysgyfarnogod (Welsh for 'Bare hill of the hares') is a mountain in Snowdonia, North Wales and is the northernmost of the Rhinogydd. Rhinog Fawr lies directly south.

It overlooks Llyn Trawsfynydd, and from the summit it is possible to see the towns of Porthmadog and Blaenau Ffestiniog. It may be climbed from Trawsfynydd in the east, or from Talsarnau in the west.

To the north-west of the summit, on an area of moorland and rocky outcrops, lies Bryn Cader Faner, an ancient stone circle. It is one of the finest examples of a Bronze Age cairn in Britain, and has rocky standing stones along its circumference.
