= Afon Mawddach =

River in Gwynedd, Wales

Coordinates: 52.85452°N 3.75388°W

Afon Mawddach River Mawddach
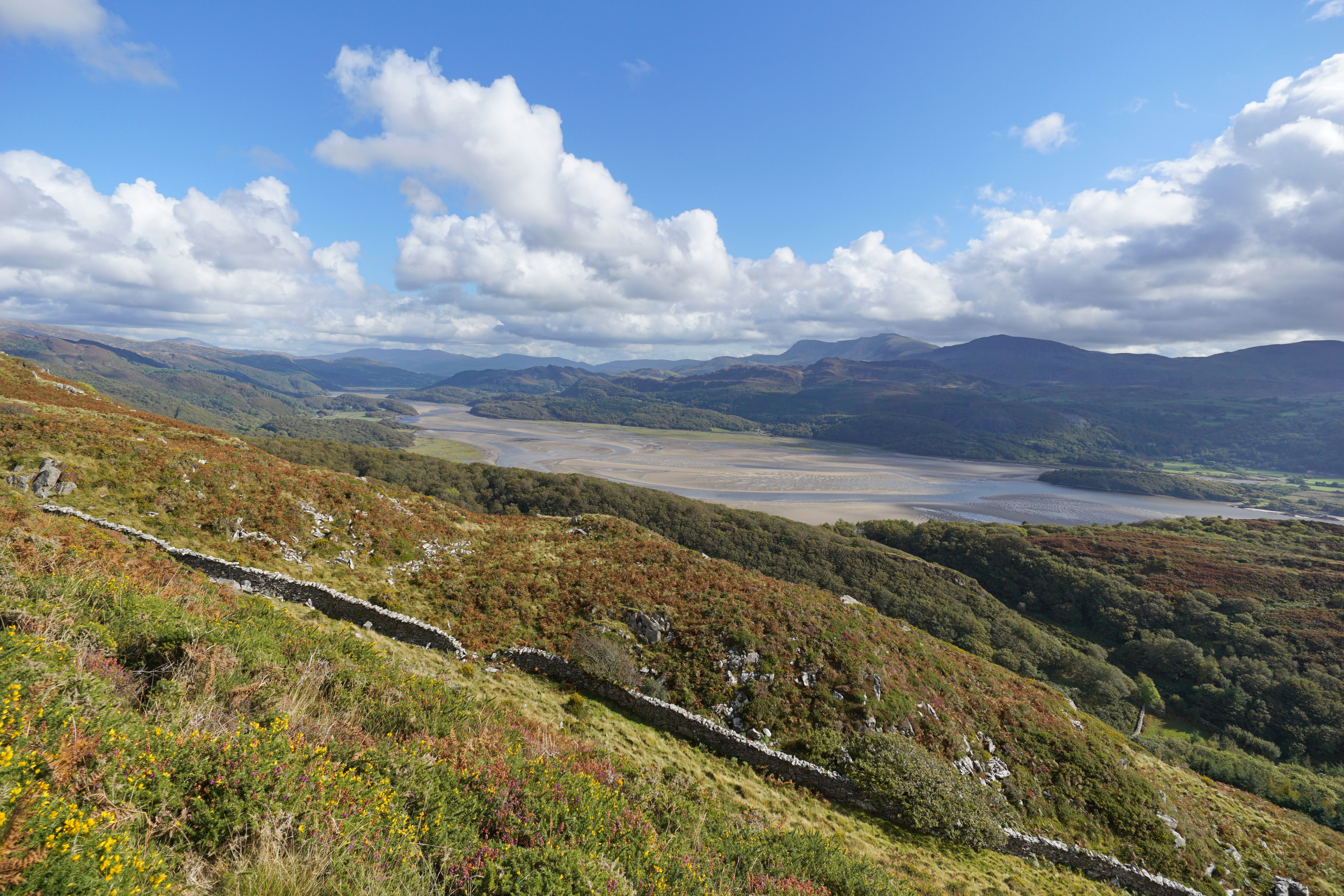
- The Mawddach Estuary from above Barmouth

Location
- Country: Wales
- County: Gwynedd

Physical characteristics
- Source
  - location: Llanuwchllyn
- Mouth
  - location: Barmouth
- Length: 28 mi (45 km)

Afon Mawddach (Welsh for 'River Mawddach'; Welsh pronunciation: [ˈmaʊ̯ðaχ]) is a river in Gwynedd, Wales, which has its source in a wide area (SH820300) north of Dduallt in Snowdonia. Below Dolgellau it enters a wide estuary.

== River and tributaries ==
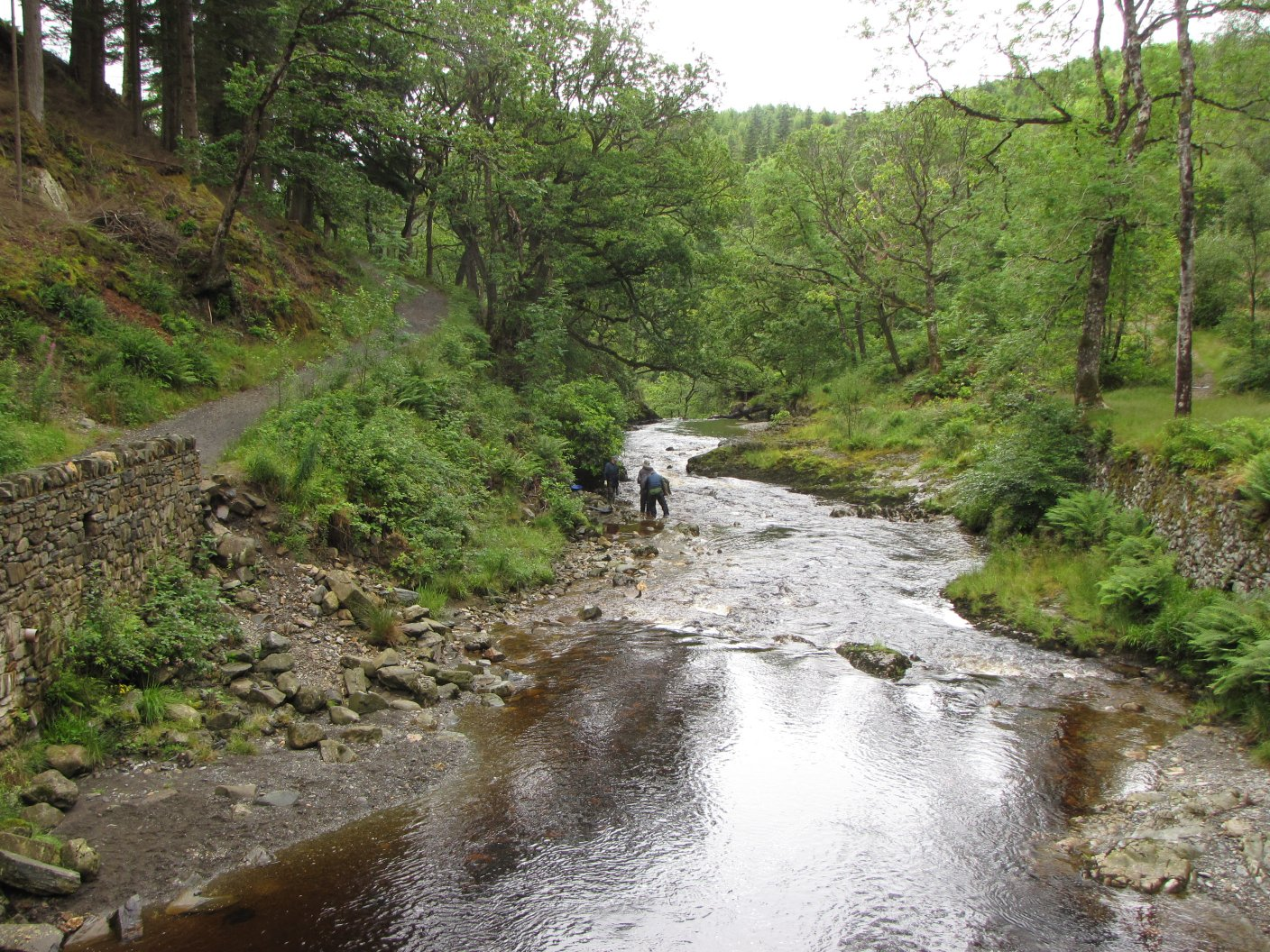
Gold panning in the Mawddach, in Coed-y-Brenin

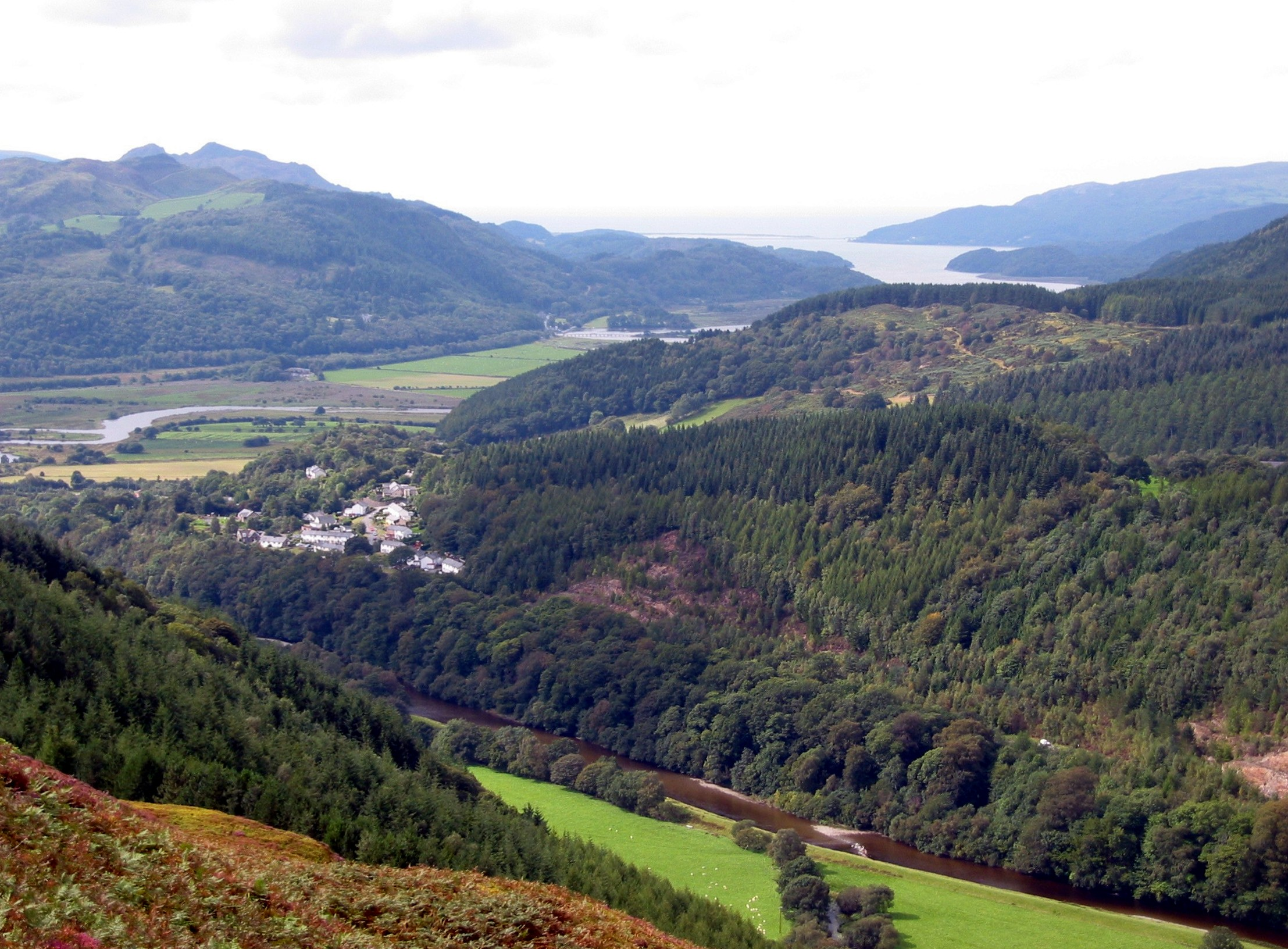
The Mawddach north of Dolgellau, looking west to Barmouth Bay

The Mawddach is 28 miles (45 km) in length, and is much branched; many of the significant tributaries are of a similar size to the main river. The catchment area is bounded to the east by the Aran Fawddwy massif and to the west and north by the Harlech dome which forms a watershed just south of Llyn Trawsfynydd.

The Mawddach has been the site of significant industrialisation and land management. Gold mining and subsequently gold panning have had major impacts but forestry, the preparation of animal skins, the storage of old munitions and the use of hill-sides as artillery ranges have all added to the legacy of pollution. The river is also very flashy - prone to very rapid rise and fall in level depending on rainfall. Rainfall can also be very heavy and it falls on very base-poor soils leading to episodes of strongly depressed pH. Despite this, the river sustains an important salmon and trout fishery and the countryside through which it flows is some of the most spectacular and scenic in the UK.

The main tributaries starting in the west and working clockwise are:

- Afon Cwm Mynach which drains Llyn Cwm Mynach on the Rhinogydd.
- Afon Gamlan which joins at Ganllwyd after following a tumultuous valley through ancient oak woods before descending towards the main river down Rhaeadr Ddu (Black waterfalls). This valley has one of the more important moss and liverwort communities in the southern UK.
- Afon Eden - its headwaters known as Afon Crawcwellt - a large tributary draining from below Llyn Trawsfynydd and closely following the A470 through the Coed-y-Brenin forest. This tributary has been severely affected by industrialisation in the past, including gold mining and its use as an ordnance range.
- Afon Gain, a large tributary which has also been impacted by similar problems to the Eden and is very acidic and peaty.
- Afon Wen which joins south of the Gain is similar but smaller.
- Afon Wnion is a major tributary joining from the east and which drains a large area out towards Aran Fawddwy

== Estuary ==
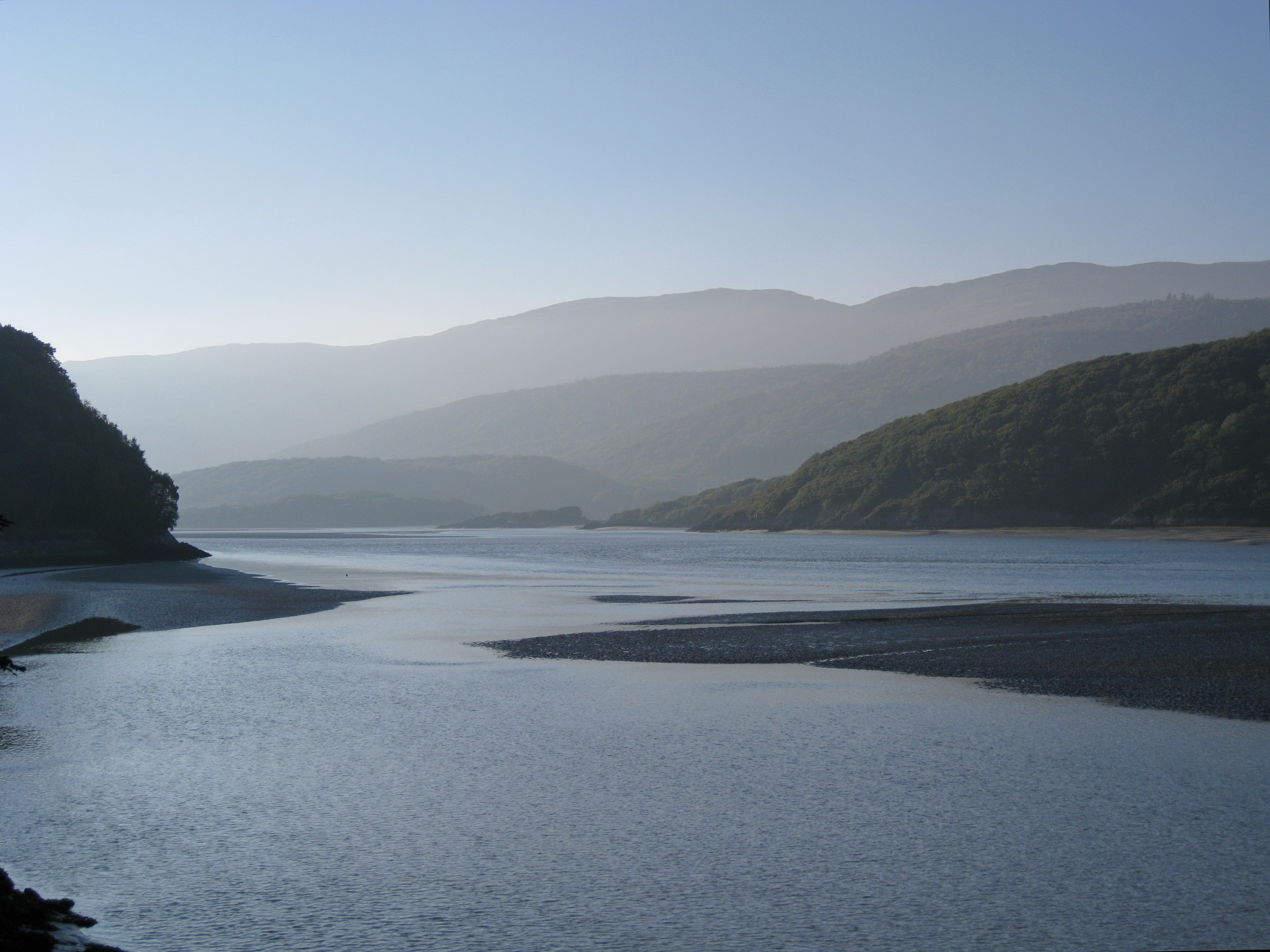
View of the estuary from the Mawddach Trail west of Penmaenpool, looking west

Below Dolgellau the river enters a wide and sandy estuary, overlooked by Cadair Idris (893 m) in the south and Diffwys (750 m) in the north. The head of the estuary is marked by the confluence of the Mawddach and Wnion. At its mouth is the town of Barmouth with its railway bridge.

=== Geology ===
The Mawddach estuary was formed from a glaciated valley which was flooded by the sea during the Holocene glacial retreat to form a fjord.

The valley occupied by the present Mawddach was later infilled by coarse-grained sub-glacial and pro-glacial deposits. In the Holocene (12,000 BP - present), gravel from the Irish Sea was introduced to the estuary.

=== Human history ===
The southern bank of the Mawddach estuary, along which used to run a section of the GWR branch line from Ruabon to Barmouth, has now been designated the Mawddach Trail, an 8-mile cycle path running from Dolgellau to Morfa Mawddach, at the south side of the Barmouth railway bridge. It is managed by the Eryri National Park Authority as a leisure route for walkers and cyclists, and is part of the Sustrans Cross-Wales Cycling Route.

The estuary of the Mawddach was a great centre of ship building in the 18th century and probably for some centuries before. There is no evidence remaining of this activity in the estuary today.

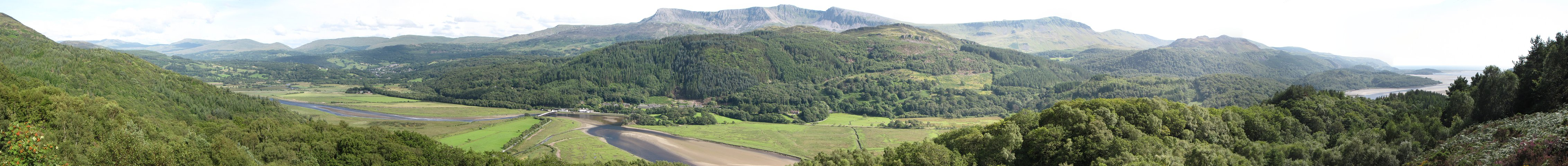
Panorama of the Mawddach towards Penmaenpool and Cadair Idris
