= Foel Penolau =

Coordinates: 52.89373°N 3.99118°W

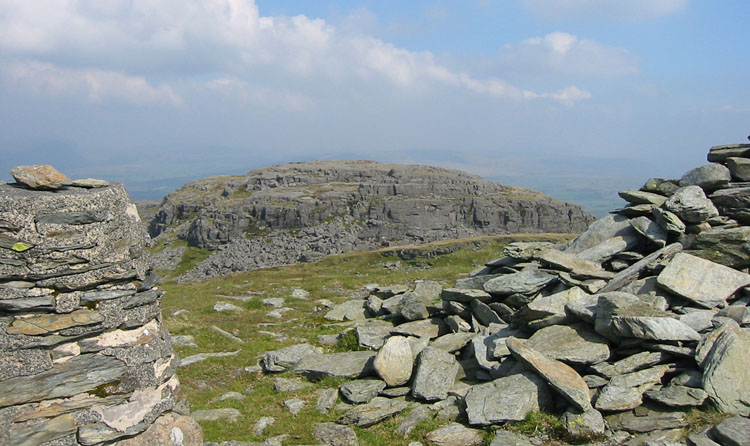
- Foel Penolau from the summit of Moel Ysgyfarnogod

Highest point
- Elevation: 614 m (2,014 ft)
- Prominence: 32 m (105 ft)
- Parent peak: Moel Ysgyfarnogod
- Listing: Simm, Hewitt, Nuttall

Naming
- English translation: bare hill with light top
- Language of name: Welsh

Geography
- Location: Gwynedd, Wales
- Parent range: Rhinogydd
- OS grid: SH661348
- Topo map: OS Landranger 124

Foel Penolau is a mountain close to Moel Ysgyfarnogod in Snowdonia, North Wales and is the northernmost summit of the Rhinogydd, and overlooks Llyn Trawsfynydd. From the summit it is possible to see the towns of Porthmadog and Blaenau Ffestiniog. As a result of a revised survey of its topographical prominence, Foel Penolau gained Hewitt and Simms status in December 2018 when its prominence was measured to be above 30 m (98 ft).

The top of Foel Penolau is reputed to be one of the rockiest summits in Snowdonia, where hands must be used to attain the summit. The summit is on a large smooth slab of rock which is the surface of the outcrop from which the top was formed.
