= Rhinog Fawr =

Mountain in Snowdonia, Wales

Coordinates: 52.84169°N 3.99687°W

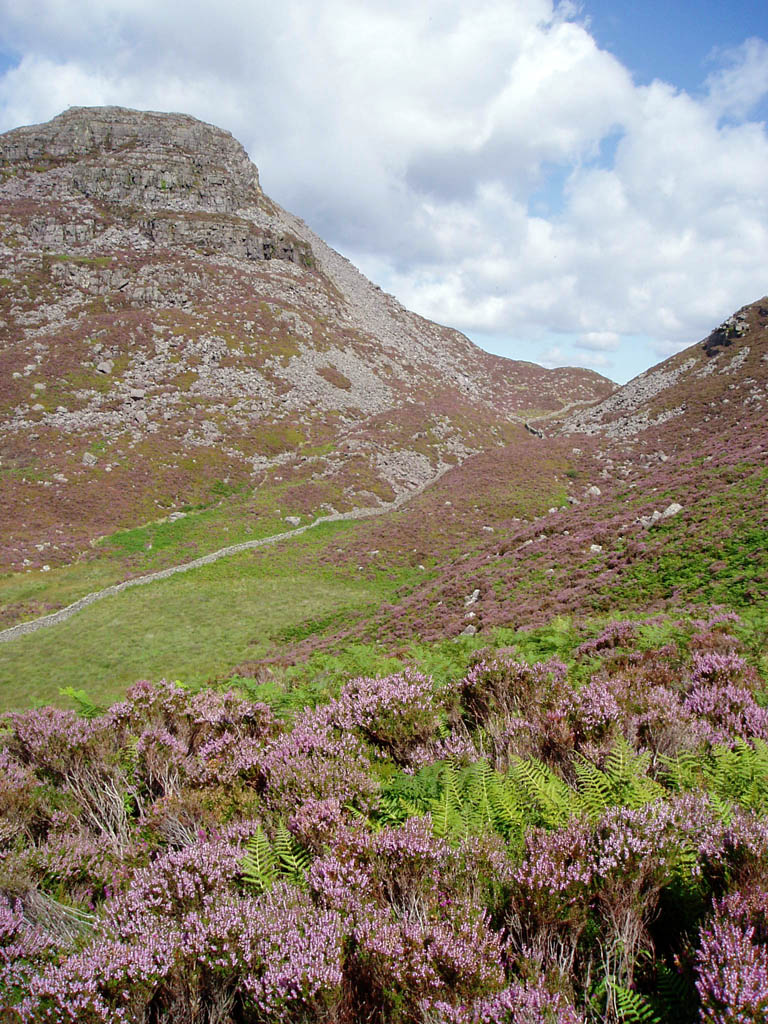
- The southeast shoulder of Rhinog Fawr above Bwlch Drws-Ardudwy

Highest point
- Elevation: 720 m (2,360 ft)
- Prominence: 363 m (1,191 ft)
- Parent peak: Y Llethr
- Listing: Marilyn, Hewitt, Nuttall

Naming
- Pronunciation: Welsh: [ˈr̥ɪnɔɡ ˈvau̯r]

Geography
- Location: Gwynedd, Wales
- Parent range: Rhinogydd, Snowdonia
- OS grid: SH656290
- Topo map: OS Landranger 124

Rhinog Fawr is a mountain in Snowdonia, North Wales and forms part of the Rhinogydd range. It is the third highest summit of the Rhinogydd, losing out to Y Llethr and Diffwys respectively. Its smaller cousin Rhinog Fach lies to the south, separated by the pass of Bwlch Drws Ardudwy, while its other neighbour, Moel Ysgyfarnogod lies to the north.

In common with most of the range, the terrain is characterised by hard sedimentary rock covered with heather, making progress on foot difficult. At 510m, nestled in crags, lies Llyn Du, a small tarn beneath the summit. The ascent is most easily made from the north-east or north-west, via the Roman Steps pass.
