= Cwm Nantcol =

Valley in Gwynedd, Wales

Coordinates: 52.819°N 4.018°W

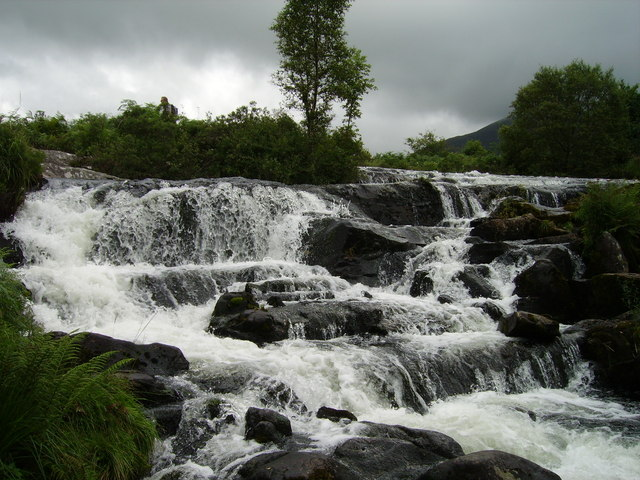
Nantcol Waterfalls

Cwm Nantcol is a valley in the Ardudwy area of the county of Gwynedd in Wales.

It lies in the Rhinogydd range of mountains in Snowdonia and carries the Afon Cwmnantcol. At the head of Cwn Nantcol is the Bwlch Drws Ardudwy pass, from where it is possible to negotiate the summits of Rhinog Fawr and Rhinog Fach.

In 1918, a treasure hoard was discovered by a man searching for manganese in the valley.
