= Coed-y-Brenin =

Forest near Dogellau in Gwynedd, Wales

Coordinates: 52.82504°N 3.91596°W

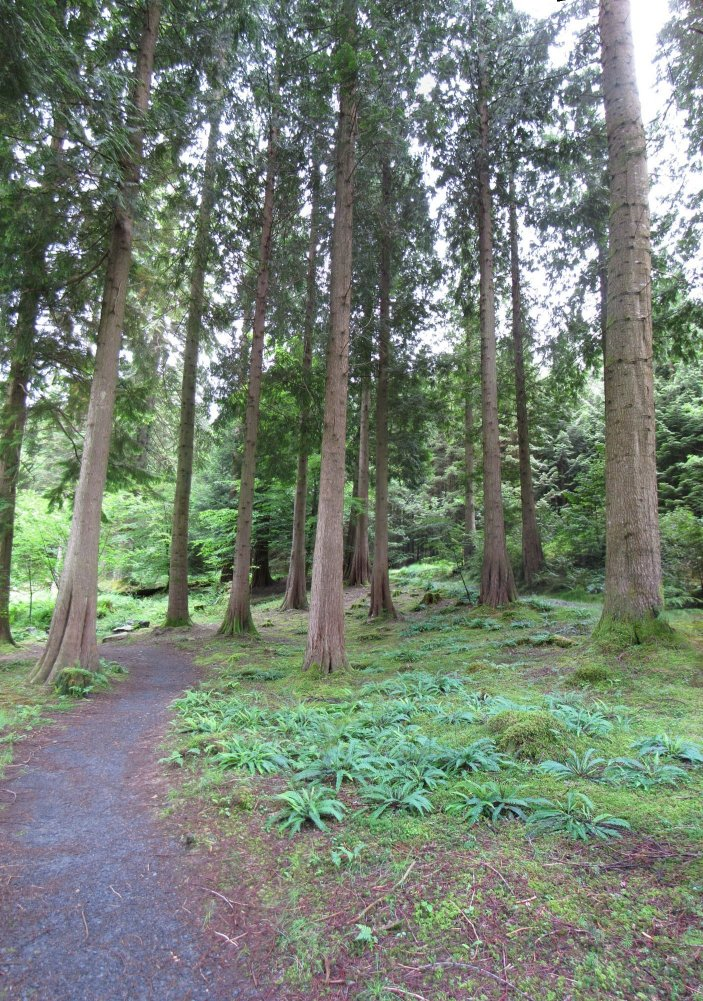

Map showing the location of Coed-y-Brenin within Wales

Coed y Brenin (Welsh for King's Forest) is a forest in the Snowdonia National Park, North Wales near Dolgellau at grid reference SH7127. It is popular for its mountain bike trails and hiking paths. It has several man-made mountain bike singletrack courses in a woodland setting, varying in length from 12 to 38 km (7.5 to 23.6 mi), and one dual slalom course.

The site is owned and operated by Natural Resources Wales, and covers an area of some 9,000 acres (36 km^{2}) around the valleys of the rivers Mawddach, Eden, Gain and Wen. There is no charge for using the trails, but there is a charge for the car park at Coed y Brenin Visitor Centre. This costs £2 for first 2hours and then 40p per 20minutes capped at maximum £7. All of the proceeds go towards the maintenance and improvement of the forest trails.

Coed y Brenin was identified as a potential mountain bike race course in 1990, and the first races were held there in 1991. The initial course had to be chopped out of an impassable rock-strewn terrain.

Shortly afterwards a Mountain Biking hire shop, together with a visitor centre and café were opened at Maesgwm. Five waymarked trails were developed by Dafydd Davis who was employed by Forest Enterprise as a Forest Sports Development Adviser, grew Coed y Brenin into a major UK mountain biking centre. Davis received an MBE in the 2004 Queen's Birthday Honours list for 'services to forestry' relating to his work on this resort.

A new £1.6 million visitor centre opened in the summer of 2006. Since the opening of the centre, the trail offering has grown to eight mountain biking trails, eight walking trails and five running trails. These trails are way marked.

The visitor information desk is available seven days per week, throughout the year (except Christmas Day, Boxing Day and New Year's Day) during the gift shop opening hours of 10:00hrs and 16:00hrs. There are a number of picnic tables around the main car parks within Coed y Brenin Forest Park plus many more on the waymarked walking trails. Some of the picnic tables have metal frames for holding disposable barbeques. There are also stone BBQ plinths in Glasdir and Ty'n y Groes picnic sites.

== Mountain bike trails ==
In the late 1980s, Mark Willmore first had talks with the Forestry Commission about bringing mountain biking onto forestry commission land. Willmore ran the first trail centre at Coed-y-Brenin. Davis took up the baton the following season and has had an influential role in making the centre what it is today. Willmore and his then French business partner, Sophie Rebore that brought the French MBK brand of MTB to Wales after seeing the potential of this then fledgling sport in the French ski resorts. (Currently E-Bikes or electric bikes are not allowed on the trails due to the higher wear and tear they cause.) Electric bikes have been allowed for several years and can be rented from the Visitor Centre.

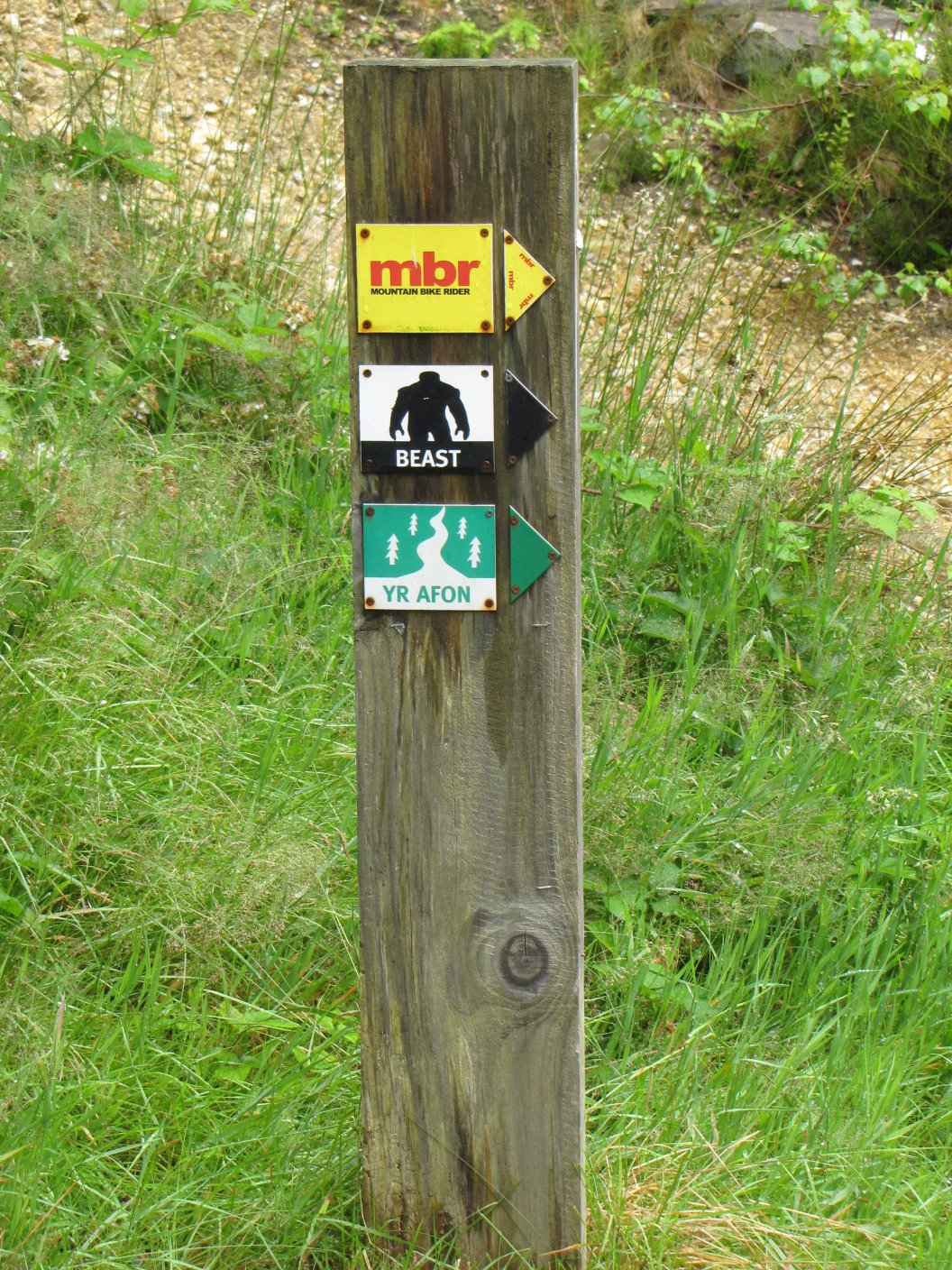
trail markers

Trail Name	Grade	Waymarking	Length		Time needed
Afon	novice (green)	river	8 mi	13 km	1.3 hours
Minotaur (Loop 1)	intermediate (blue)	minotaur	1.9 mi	3 km	20 - 40 min
Minotaur (Loop 2)	intermediate (blue)	minotaur	3.1 mi	5 km	0.5 - 1 hour
Minotaur (Loop 3)	intermediate (blue)	minotaur	5.6 mi	9 km	1 – 2 hours
Temtiwr	difficult (red)	apple	5 mi	9 km	1 hours
Cyflym Coch	difficult (red)	red fox	6.8 mi	11 km	1.5 – 3 hours
Dragon's Back	difficult (red)	dragon's back	19 mi	31 km	4 hours
Tarw	severe (black)	bull	12 mi	20 km	2 hours
MBR	severe (black)	MBR logo	11 mi	18 km	2 hours
The Beast	severe (black)	beast	24 mi	38 km	4.5 hours
