= Moelfre (hill) =

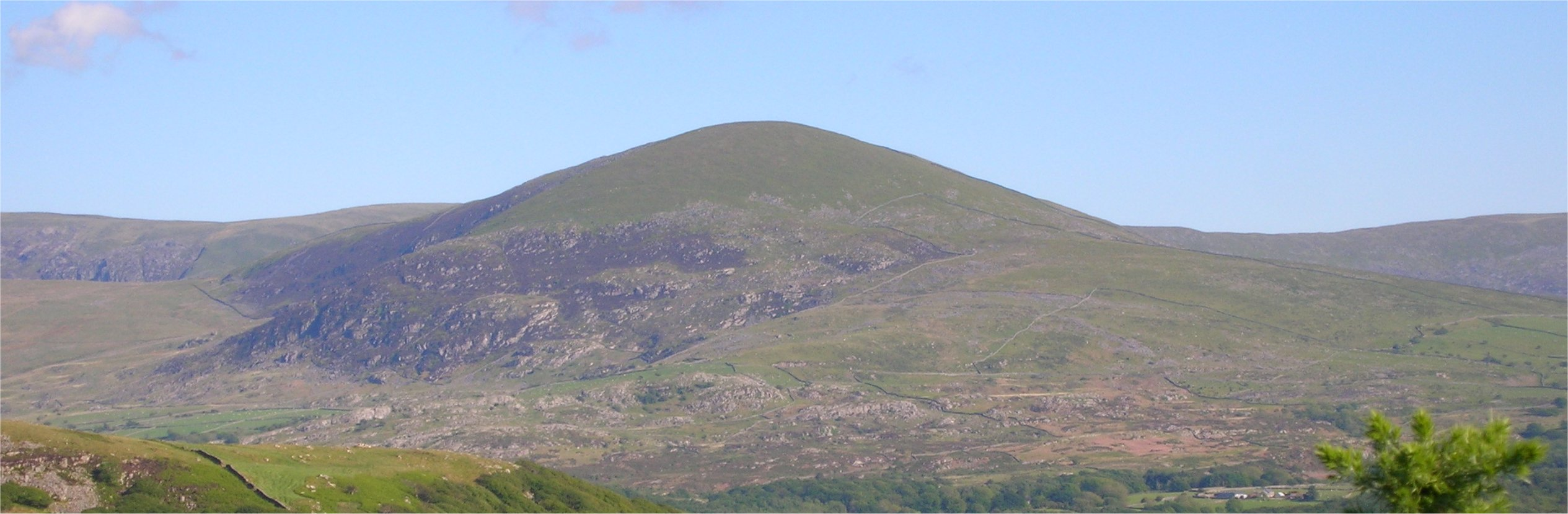

Highest point
- Elevation: 589 m (1,932 ft)
- Prominence: 162 m
- Parent peak: Y Llethr
- Listing: Marilyn, Dewey
- Coordinates: 52°48′05″N 4°02′21″W

Geography
- Location: Gwynedd, Wales
- Parent range: Rhinogydd, Snowdonia
- OS grid: SH 62623 24592
- Topo map: OS Landranger 124

Moelfre is a large hill in Wales on the far western edge of the Snowdonia National Park, 3 miles (4.8 km) from the village of Dyffryn Ardudwy, 5 miles (8.0 km) from the village of Llanbedr and about 10 miles (16 km) from the town of Harlech. It forms part of the Rhinogydd range. Moelfre reaches a height of 589 metres (1,932 ft).

Moelfre is a prominent peak that separates Cwm Nantcol from Ysgethin Valley. Moelfre is also known for a legend of three women who worked on the sabbath and were turned into standing stones.
