= Rhinog Fach =

Mountain in Snowdonia, Wales

Coordinates: 52.82392°N 3.98418°W

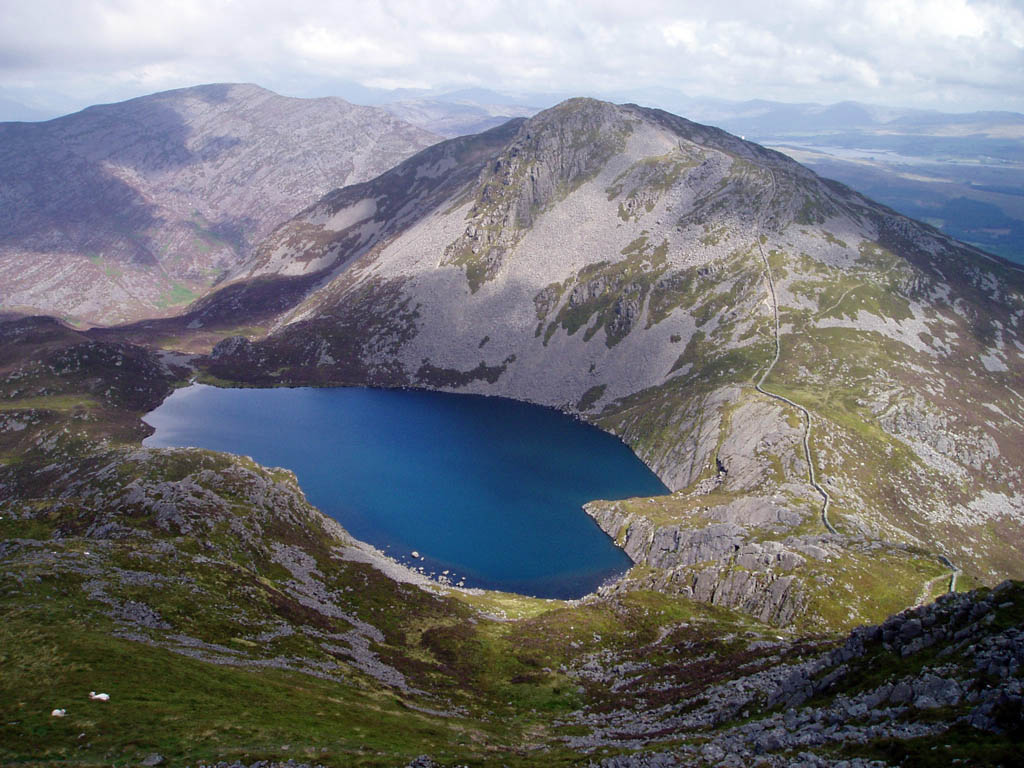
- Rhinog Fach and Llyn Hywel from Y Llethr with Rhinog Fawr in the distance

Highest point
- Elevation: 712 m (2,336 ft)
- Prominence: 151 m (495 ft)
- Parent peak: Y Llethr
- Listing: Marilyn, Hewitt, Nuttall

Naming
- Pronunciation: Welsh: [ˈr̥ɪnɔɡ ˈvaːχ]

Geography
- Location within Gwynedd
- Location: Gwynedd, Wales
- Parent range: Snowdonia
- OS grid: SH664270
- Topo map: OS Landranger 124

Rhinog Fach is a mountain in Snowdonia, North Wales and forms part of the Rhinogydd. Technically, Rhinog Fach is a subsidiary summit of Y Llethr, but is a Marilyn. To the north lies its higher cousin Rhinog Fawr, separated by the shapely pass of Bwlch Drws Ardudwy.

Although lower than the highest mountain in the Rhinog range, Y Llethr, it is often regarded as the true 'king of the Rhinogydd' due to its spectacular rocky peak. Unlike Fach, Y Llethr's peak is grassy and unremarkable.
