= Diffwys =

Mountain in Snowdonia, Wales

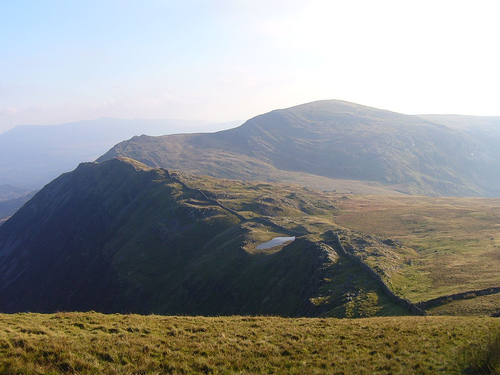
- Diffwys and Crib-y-rhiw from Y Llethr

Highest point
- Elevation: 750 m (2,460 ft)
- Prominence: 148 m (486 ft)
- Parent peak: Y Llethr
- Listing: sub Marilyn, Hewitt, Nuttall
- Coordinates: 52°47′29″N 3°59′14″W

Geography
- Location within Gwynedd
- Location: Gwynedd, Wales
- Parent range: Rhinogydd
- OS grid: SH661234
- Topo map: OS Landranger 124

Listed summits of Diffwys
Name	Grid ref	Height	Status
Diffwys West Top		642 metres (2,106 ft)	sub Hewitt, Nuttall

Diffwys is a mountain in Snowdonia, Wales, near Barmouth and forms part of the Rhinogydd. On the north side is an exposure of the Caerdion Syncline. It is technically a subsidiary summit of Y Llethr, missing Marilyn status by 2m. It is therefore a sub Marilyn.

The summit has a trig point. To the west is Diffwys West Top, to the north are Crib-y-rhiw and Y Llethr, to the east is Y Garn, and to the south, across the Mawddach estuary, is Cadair Idris. The Afon Ysgethin rises west of the ridge connecting Diffwys and Y Llethr, running towards Cardigan Bay; Llyn Bodlyn reservoir is north of Diffwys West Top.

Diffwys, overlooking the Mawddach estuary (Diffwys West Top is above the centre of the image)
