= Y Llethr =

Mountain in Snowdonia, Wales

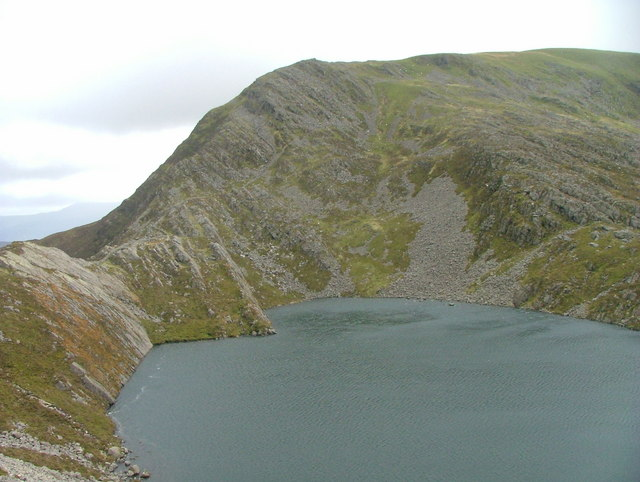
- Y Llethr from above Llyn Hywel

Highest point
- Elevation: 756 m (2,480 ft)
- Prominence: 561 m (1,841 ft)
- Parent peak: Moel Siabod
- Listing: Marilyn, Hewitt, Nuttall
- Coordinates: 52°48′46.8″N 3°59′9.6″W

Naming
- English translation: the slope
- Language of name: Welsh
- Pronunciation: Welsh: [ə ˈɬɛθr]

Geography
- Location: Gwynedd, Wales
- Parent range: Rhinogydd
- OS grid: SH661258
- Topo map: OS Landranger 124

Listed summits of Y Llethr
Name	Grid ref	Height	Status
Diffwys		750 metres (2,461 ft)	sub Marilyn, Hewitt, Nuttall
Rhinog Fach		712 metres (2,336 ft)	sub Marilyn, Hewitt, Nuttall
Crib-y-rhiw		670 metres (2,198 ft)	Nuttall

Y Llethr is the highest mountain in the Rhinogydd range of Snowdonia, in north Wales. The summit consists of a flat grassy top marked only by a small cairn. The summit is more in keeping with its southern flanks than its rugged northern approach.

The shortest route to the summit goes from the valley of Cwm Nantcol in the west, either directly or via Bwlch Drws Ardudwy and over the mountain of Rhinog Fach. To the south lies the mountain of Diffwys, to the south-east lies the mountain of Y Garn, to the north lies Rhinog Fach and to the west lies the hill of Moelfre.
