= Culture of Wales =

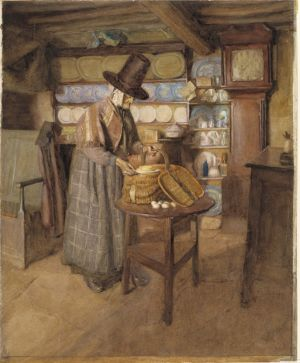
Market Day in Old Wales by Sydney Curnow Vosper (1910)

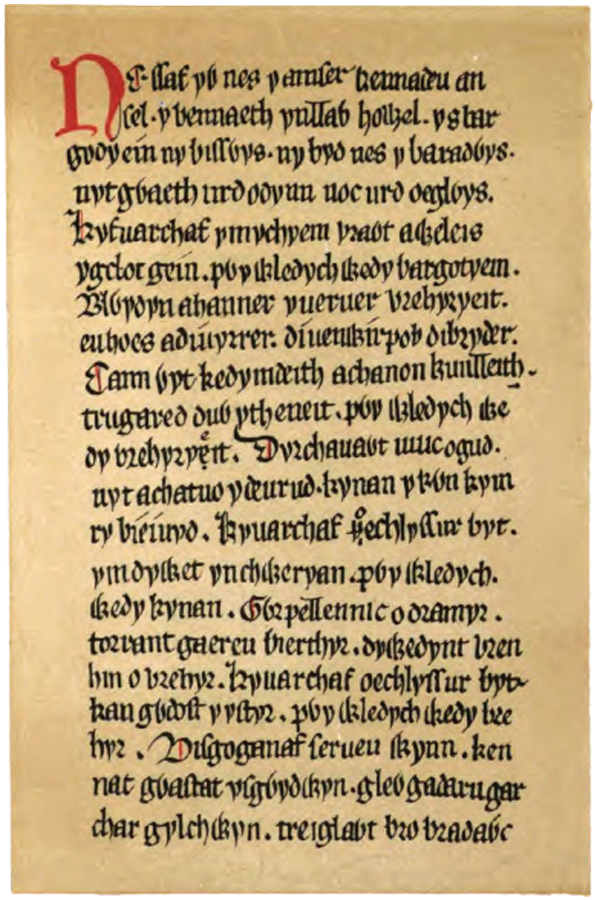
Facsimile of Part of Column 579 from the Red Book of Hergest

The culture of Wales encompasses the Welsh language, customs, festivals, music, art, cuisine, mythology, history, and politics. Wales is primarily represented by the symbol of the red Welsh Dragon, but other national emblems include the leek and the daffodil.

Although sharing many customs with the other nations of the United Kingdom, Wales has its own distinct traditions and culture, and from the late 19th century onwards, Wales acquired its popular image as the "land of song", in part due to the Eisteddfod tradition.

== Development of Welsh culture ==
=== Historical influences ===
Wales has been identified as having been inhabited by humans for some 230,000 years, as evidenced by the discovery of a Neanderthal at the Bontnewydd Palaeolithic site in north Wales. After the Roman era of occupation, a number of small kingdoms arose in what is now Wales; however, details prior to the 8th century AD are unclear. Kingdoms during that era included Gwynedd, Powys and Deheubarth. While Rhodri the Great in the 9th century was the first ruler to dominate a large portion of Wales, it was not until 1055 that Gruffydd ap Llywelyn united the individual Welsh kingdoms and began to annex parts of England. Gruffydd was killed, possibly in crossfire by his own men, on 5 August 1063 while Harold Godwinson sought to engage him in battle. This was just over three years before the Norman invasion of England, which led to a drastic change of fortune for Wales. By 1070, the Normans had already seen successes in their invasion of Wales, with Gwent fallen and Deheubarth plundered. The invasion was seemingly complete by 1093. However, the Welsh kingdoms were re-established and most of the land retaken from the Normans over the following decades.

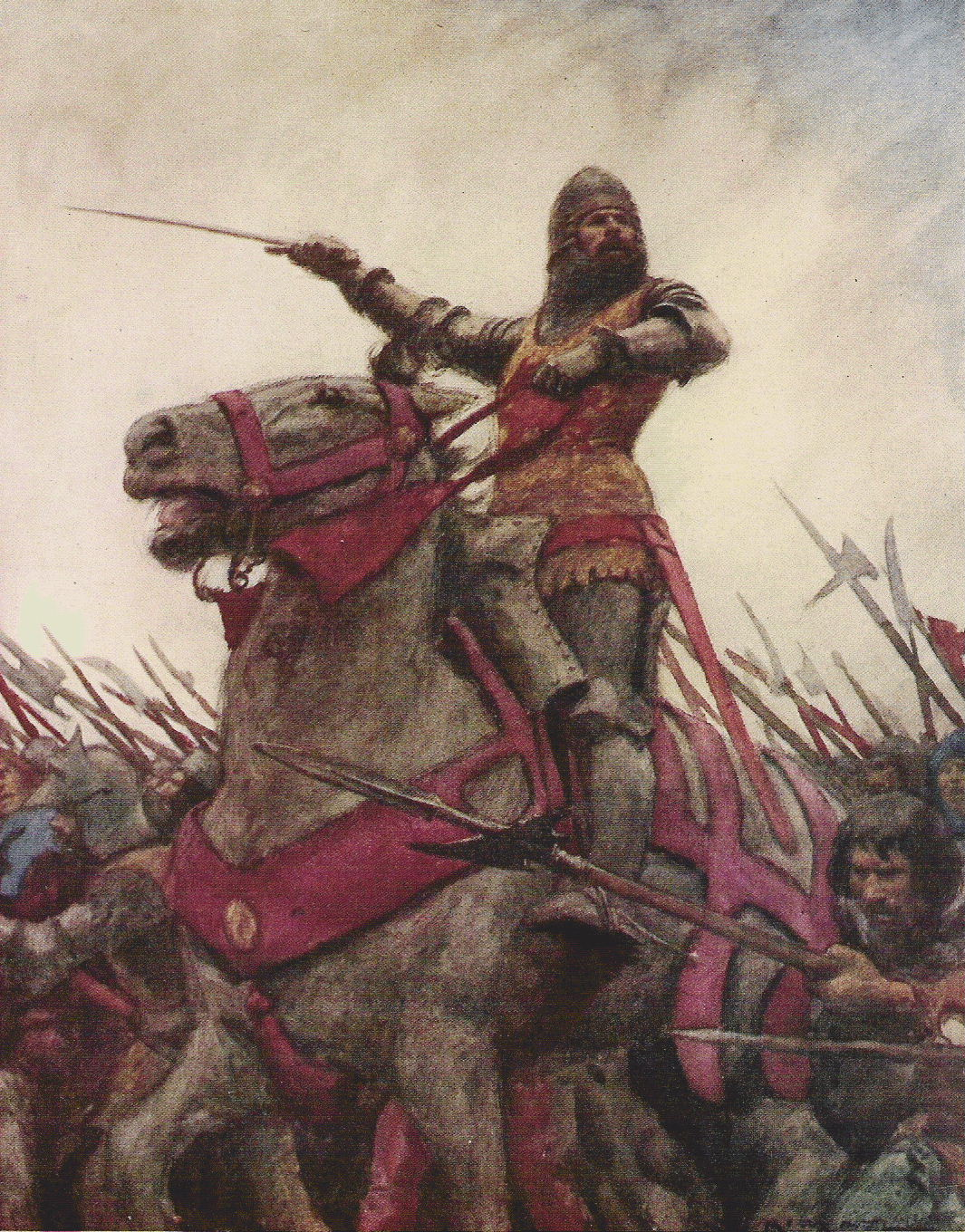
Owain Glyndŵr painting by AC Michael

While Gwynedd grew in strength, Powys was broken up after the death of Madog ap Maredudd's son Llywelyn ap Madog in the 1160s and was never reunited. Llywelyn the Great rose in Gwynedd and had reunited the majority of Wales by his death in 1240. After his death, King Henry III of England intervened to prevent Dafydd ap Llywelyn from inheriting his father's lands outside Gwynedd, leading to war. The claims of his successor, Llywelyn ap Gruffudd, conflicted with those of King Edward I of England; this resulted in the conquest of Wales by English forces.

The Tudors of Penmynydd grew in power and influence during the 13th to 15th centuries, first owning land in north Wales, but losing it after Maredudd ap Tudur backed the uprising of Owain Glyndŵr in 1400. Maredudd's son, Owain ap Maredudd ap Tudur, anglicised his name to become Owen Tudor, and was the grandfather of Henry Tudor. Henry took the throne of England in 1485, at the end of the Wars of the Roses, when his forces defeated those of Richard III at the Battle of Bosworth Field.

Under Henry VIII, the Laws in Wales Acts 1535-1542 were passed. The distinction between the Principality of Wales and the Marches of Wales was ended. The law of England became the only law of Wales which was then administered by justices of the peace that were appointed in every Welsh county. Wales was then represented in parliament by 26 members.

English became the only official language of courts in Wales, and people that used the Welsh language would not be eligible for public office in the territories of the king of England. Welsh was limited to the working and lower middle classes, which played a central role in the public attitude to the language.

The House of Tudor continued to reign through several successive monarchs until 1603, when James I (James VI of Scotland) took the throne for the House of Stuart; his great-grandmother was Margaret Tudor.

=== Identity and nationalism ===
Welsh nationalism (Welsh: Cenedlaetholdeb Cymreig) emphasises the distinctiveness of Welsh language, culture, and history, and calls for more self-determination for Wales, which might include more devolved powers for the Senedd or full independence from the United Kingdom. While modern ideas of a self-governing Welsh state gained prominence in the mid-18th century, a sense of nationhood and cultural continuity has existed within Wales since the end of Roman occupation.

In 1406 Owain Glyndŵr set out a vision of Welsh independence in the Pennal Letter, sent to Charles VI King of France. This includes an independent Wales with its own parliament, led by Glyndŵr as Prince of Wales, a return to the Cyfraith Hywel (Welsh laws) of Hywel Dda, the establishment of an independent Welsh church and the founding of two new universities, one in south Wales, and one in north Wales. The letter requested the military support from the French for which Glyndŵr would recognise Benedict XIII of Avignon as the Pope in return.

== Symbols ==
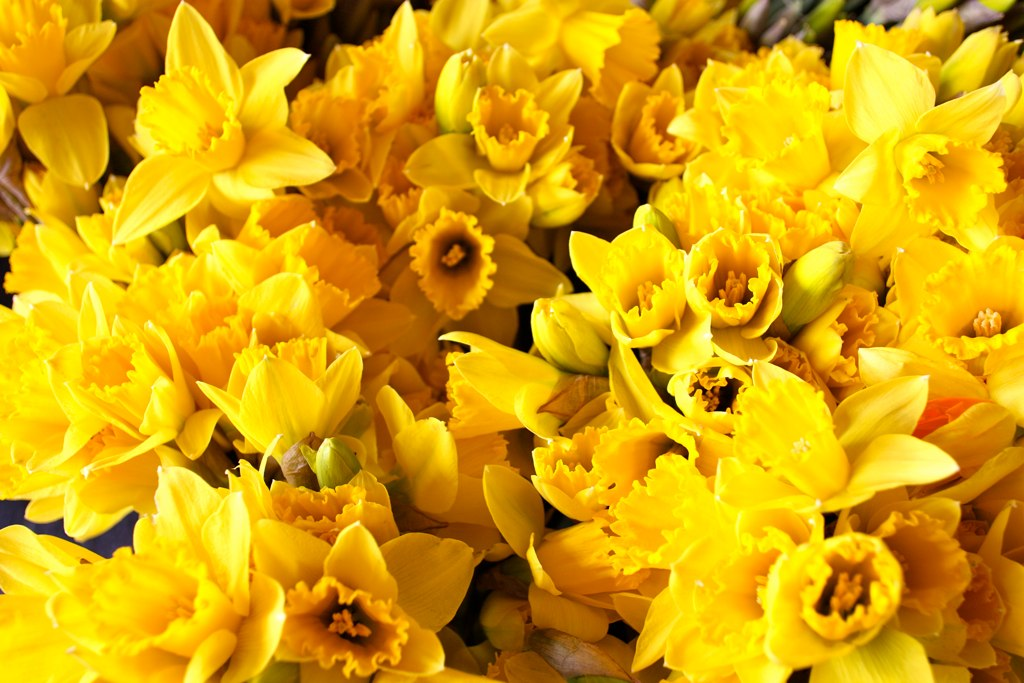
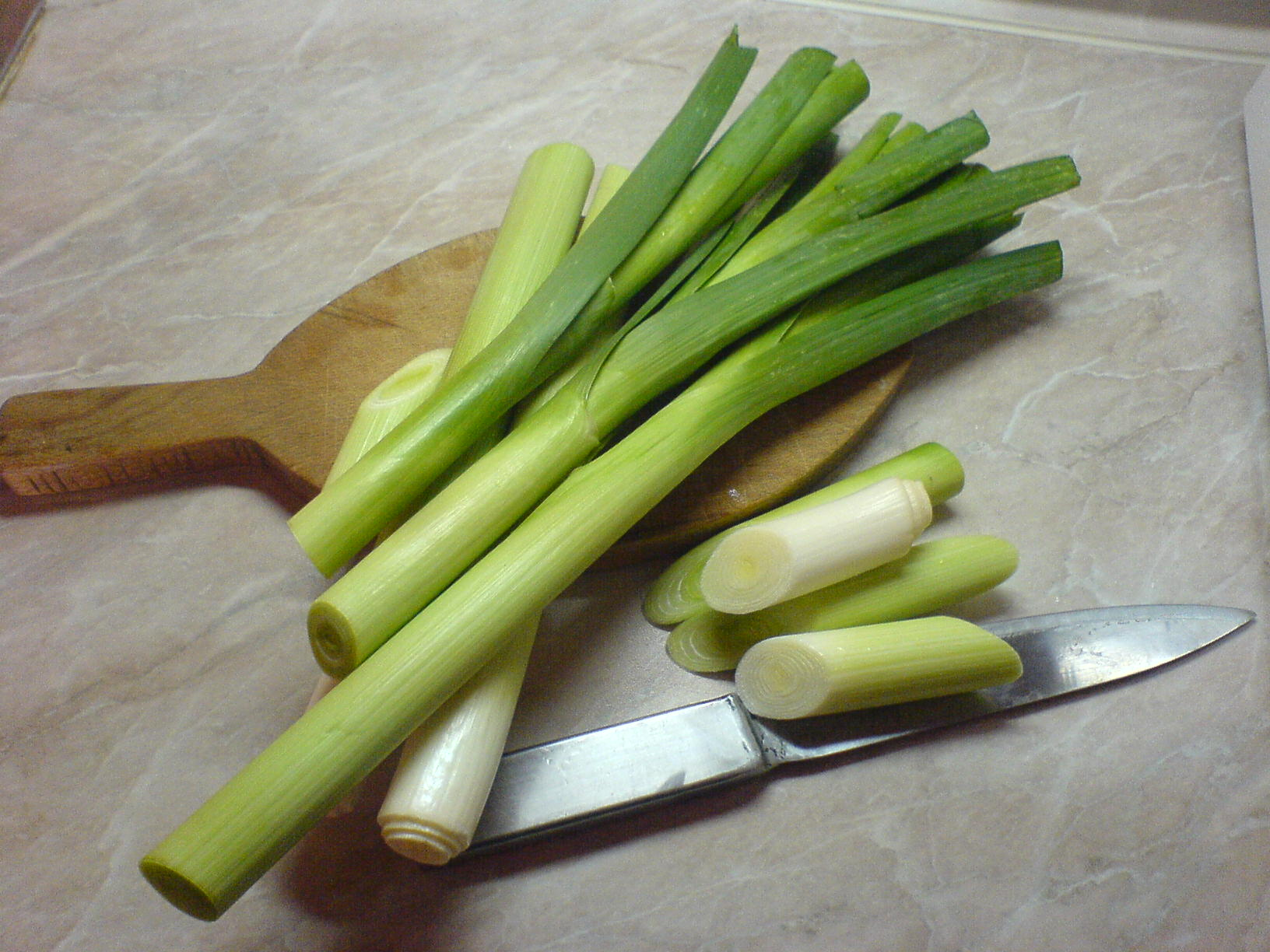
Daffodils and leeks, two of the national symbols of Wales

Red Dragon of Wales

National symbols of Wales include the dragon, the daffodil and the leek. A story of soldiers wearing the leek during battle to make it easier to identify them is recounted in the 17th century, attributed to Saint David. The earliest certain reference of the leek as a Welsh emblem was when Princess Mary, daughter of Henry VIII, was presented with a leek by the yeoman of the guard on Saint David's Day in 1537. The colours of the leek were used for the uniforms of soldiers under Edward I of England.

The Red Dragon standard was most likely introduced to the British Isles by Roman troops who in turn had acquired it from the Dacians. It may also have been a reference to the 6th century Welsh word draig, which meant "dragon". The standard was appropriated by the Normans during the 11th century, and used for the Royal Standard of Scotland. Richard I of England took a red dragon standard with him on the Third Crusade.

Both symbols were popular with Tudor kings, with Henry VII of England (Henry Tudor) adding the white and green background to the red dragon standard. It was largely forgotten by the House of Stuart, who favoured a unicorn instead. By the 17th and 18th centuries, it became common practice in Great Britain for the gentry to wear leeks on St. David's Day. In 1807, a "a red dragon passant standing on a mound" was made the King's badge for Wales. Following an increase in nationalism in 1953, it was proposed to add the motto Y ddraig goch ddyry cychwyn ("the red dragon takes the lead") to the flag. This was poorly received, and six years later Queen Elizabeth II intervened to put the current flag in place. It has been proposed that the flag of the United Kingdom be redesigned to include a symbol representing Wales, as it is the only nation in the United Kingdom not represented in the flag.

The daffodil is a more recent development, becoming popular during the 19th century. It may have been linked to the leek; the Welsh for daffodil (cenhinen Bedr) translates as "St Peter's leek". During the 20th century, the daffodil rose to rival the prominence of the leek as a symbol of Wales. Prime Minister David Lloyd George ensured that the daffodil had a place in the investiture of Edward, Prince of Wales.

The traditional Welsh costume and Welsh hat were well known during the 19th and early 20th centuries. Princess Alexandrina Victoria (later Queen Victoria) had a hat made for her when she visited Wales in 1832. The hat was popularised by Sydney Curnow Vosper's 1908 painting Salem, but by then its use had declined.

Welsh people may sometimes engage in gentle self-mockery and claim the sheep as a national emblem, due to the 3 million people in the country being vastly outnumbered by some 10 million sheep and the nation's reliance on sheep farming. The importance of sheep farming led to the creation of the Welsh sheepdog.

Welsh lovespoons are traditionally crafted wooden spoons which a suitor would give to his beloved. The more intricacies of the design served a dual purpose, as it demonstrated the depth of their feelings to the beloved, and their crafting abilities (and therefore potential to generate income to look after the family) to their potential suitor's family. The earliest known dated lovespoon from Wales, displayed in the St Fagans National History Museum near Cardiff. It is believed to have been crafted in 1667, although the tradition is believed to date back long before that.

== Language ==
The two main languages of Wales are Welsh and English. Throughout the centuries, the Welsh language has been a central factor in the concept of Wales as a nation. Figures released by the Office of National Statistics taken from the 2011 census, show that Welsh is spoken by 19% of the population.

== Religion ==
The Flag of Saint David

Before the Roman occupation, the dominant religion in Wales was a pagan one, led by the druids. Little is known about the traditions and ceremonies, but Tacitus, whose claims were sometimes exaggerated, stated that they performed human sacrifice: he says that in AD 61, an altar on Anglesey was found to be "drenched with the blood of their prisoners". Christianity was introduced to Wales through the Romans, and after they abandoned the British Isles, it survived in South East Wales at Hentland. In the 6th century, this was home to Dubricius, the first Celtic saint.

The largest religion in modern Wales is Christianity, with almost 58% of the population describing themselves as Christian in the 2011 census. The Presbyterian Church of Wales was for many years the largest denomination; it was born out of the Welsh Methodist revival in the 18th century and seceded from the Church of England in 1811; The Church in Wales had an average Sunday attendance of 32,171 in 2012. It forms part of the Anglican Communion, and was also part of the Church of England, but was disestablished by the British Government in 1920 under the Welsh Church Act 1914. Non-Christian religions have relatively few followers in Wales, with Muslims making up 1.5% of the population while Hindus and Buddhists represent 0.3% each in the 2011 census. Over 32% of the population in Wales did not note a religion. Research in 2007 by the Tearfund organisation showed that Wales had the lowest average church attendance in the UK, with 12% of the population routinely attending.

== Festival days ==
The patron saint of Wales is Saint David, Dewi Sant in Welsh. St. David's Day is celebrated on 1 March, which some people argue should be designated a public holiday in Wales. Other days which have been proposed for national public commemorations are 16 September (the day on which Owain Glyndŵr's rebellion began) and 11 December (the death of Llywelyn ap Gruffudd).

The traditional seasonal festivals in Wales are:

- Calan Gaeaf (a Hallowe'en or Samhain-type festival on the first day of winter)
- Gŵyl Fair y Canhwyllau (literally Mary's Festival of the Candles, i.e. Candlemas; also coinciding with Imbolc)
- Calan Mai (May Day, and similar to Beltane)
- Calan Awst (1 August, equivalent to Lammas and Lughnasa)
- Gŵyl Mabsant celebrated by each parish in commemoration of its native saint, often marked by a fair
- Dydd Santes Dwynwen, a Welsh equivalent to St Valentine's Day
- Calennig is a Welsh New Year celebration

== Arts ==
=== Visual arts ===
Many works of Celtic art have been found in Wales. In the Early Medieval period, the Celtic Christianity of Wales participated in the Insular art of the British Isles and a number of illuminated manuscripts possibly of Welsh origin survive, of which the 8th century Hereford Gospels and Lichfield Gospels are the most notable. The 11th century Ricemarch Psalter (now in Dublin) is certainly Welsh, made in St David's, and shows a late Insular style with unusual Viking influence.

The best of the few Welsh artists of the 16th–18th centuries tended to move elsewhere to work, but in the 18th century the dominance of landscape art in English art motivated them to stay at home, and brought an influx of artists from outside to paint Welsh scenery. The Welsh painter Richard Wilson (1714–1782) is arguably the first major British landscapist, but rather more notable for Italian scenes than Welsh ones, although he did paint several on visits from London.

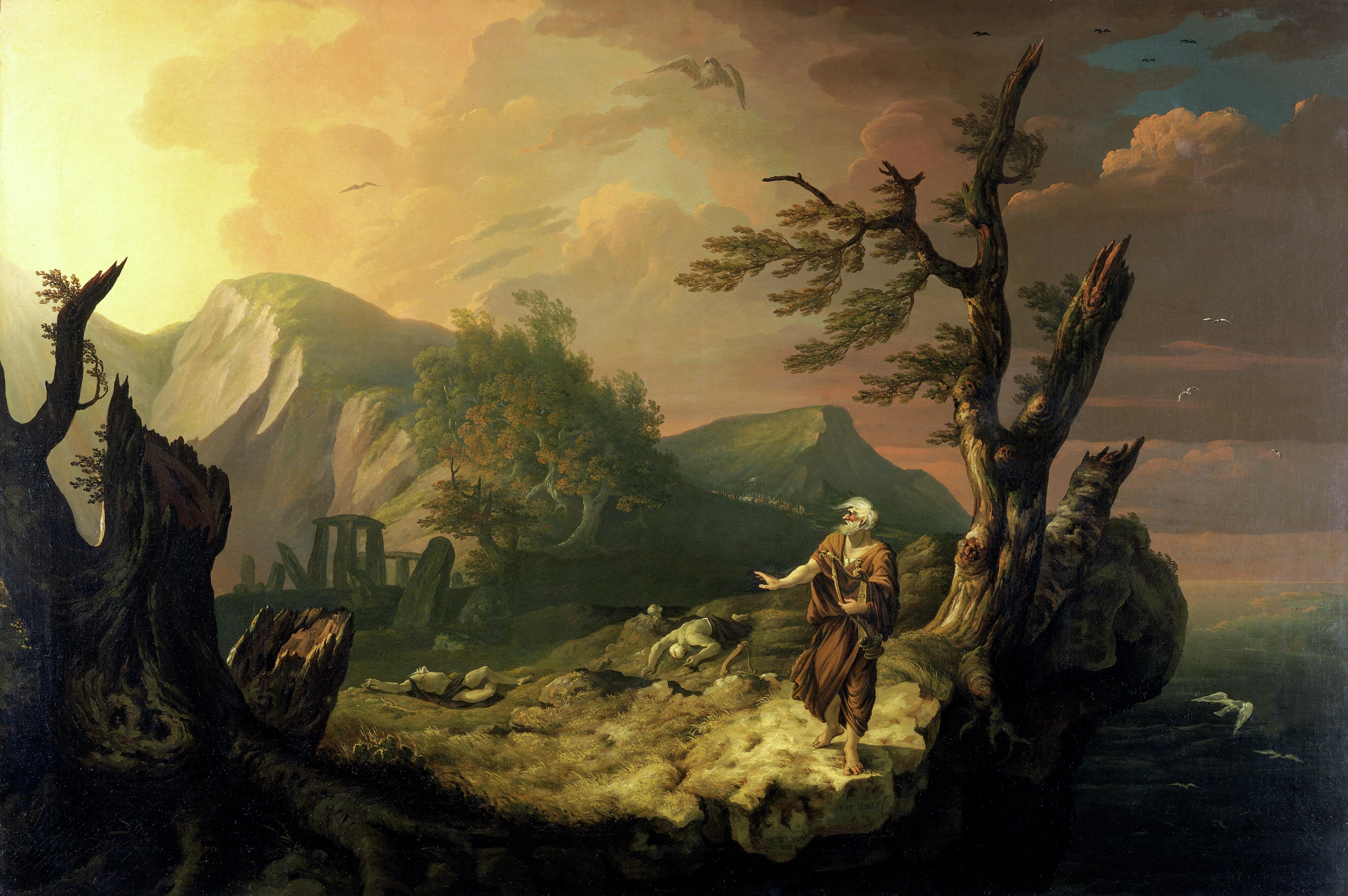
The Bard, 1774, by Thomas Jones (1742–1803)

It remained difficult for artists relying on the Welsh market to support themselves until well into the 20th century. An Act of Parliament in 1854 provided for the establishment of a number of art schools throughout the United Kingdom, and the Cardiff School of Art opened in 1865. Graduates still very often had to leave Wales to work, but Betws-y-Coed became a popular centre for artists, and its artists' colony helped form the Royal Cambrian Academy of Art in 1881. The sculptor Sir William Goscombe John made many works for Welsh commissions, although he had settled in London. Christopher Williams, whose subjects were mostly resolutely Welsh, was also based in London. Thomas E. Stephens and Andrew Vicari had very successful careers as portraitists, based respectively in the United States and France. Sir Frank Brangwyn was Welsh by origin, but spent little time in Wales.

Perhaps the most famous Welsh painters, Augustus John and his sister Gwen John, mostly lived in London and Paris; however the landscapists Sir Kyffin Williams and Peter Prendergast remained living in Wales for most of their lives, though well in touch with the wider art world. Ceri Richards was very engaged in the Welsh art scene as a teacher in Cardiff, and even after moving to London; he was a figurative painter in international styles including Surrealism. Various artists have moved to Wales, including Eric Gill, the London-born Welshman David Jones, and the sculptor Jonah Jones. The Kardomah Gang was an intellectual circle centred on the poet Dylan Thomas and poet and artist Vernon Watkins in Swansea, which also included the painter Alfred Janes.

=== Ceramics ===
Amgueddfa Cymru houses Welsh pottery made in Swansea and Llanelli between 1764 and 1922, in addition to porcelain made at Swansea and Nantgarw between 1813 and 1826. Several further sites can be identified through their place names, for example Pwllcrochan (a hamlet near Milford Haven estuary in Pembrokeshire), which translates to Crock Pool, and archaeology has also revealed former kiln sites across the country. These were often located near clay beds, for ease of resource gathering. Buckley and Ewenny became leading areas of pottery production in Wales during the 17th and 18th centuries; these are applied as generic terms to different potters within those areas during this period. South Wales had several notable potteries during that same period, an early exponent being the Cambrian Pottery (1764–1870, also known as "Swansea pottery"). The works from Cambrian attempted to imitate those of Wedgwood. Nantgarw Pottery, near Cardiff, was in operation from 1813 to 1823 making fine porcelain. Llanelly Pottery was the last surviving major pottery works in South Wales when it closed in 1922.

=== Theatre ===
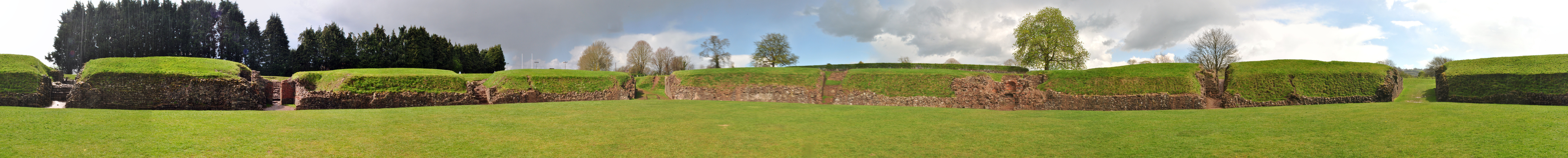
360° panoramic view of the amphitheatre at Caerleon

Theatrical performances are thought to have begun after the Roman invasion of Britain. There are remains of a Roman amphitheatre at Caerleon, which would have served the nearby fortress of Isca Augusta. Between Roman and modern times, theatre in Wales was limited to performances of travelling players, sometimes in temporary structures. Welsh theatrical groups also performed in England, as did English groups in Wales. The rise of the Puritans in the 17th century and then Methodism during the 18th century caused declines in Welsh theatre as performances were seen as immoral.

Despite this, performances continued on showgrounds, and with a handful of travelling groups of actors. The Savoy Theatre, Monmouth, the oldest theatre still in operation in Wales, was built during the 19th century and originally operated as the Assembly Rooms. Other theatres opened over the following decades, with Cardiff's Theatre Royal opening in 1827. After a fire, a replacement Theatre Royal opened in 1878. Competition for theatres led to further buildings being constructed, such as the New Theatre, Cardiff, which opened on 10 December 1906.

=== Television ===
Television in the United Kingdom started in 1936 as a public service which was free of advertising, but did not arrive in Wales until the opening of the Wenvoe transmitter in August 1952. Initially all programmes were in the English language, although under the leadership of Welsh director and controller Alun Oldfield-Davies, occasional Welsh language programmes were broadcast during closed periods, replacing the test card. In 1958, responsibility for programming in Wales fell to Television Wales and the West, although Welsh language broadcasting was mainly served by the Manchester-based Granada company, producing about an hour a week. On 1 November 1982, S4C (Sianel Pedwar Cymru) was launched bringing together the BBC, HTV and other independent producers to provide an initial service of 22 hours of Welsh-language television. The digital switchover in Wales of 2009-2010 meant that the previously bilingual Channel 4 split into S4C, broadcasting exclusively in Welsh and Channel 4 broadcasting exclusively in English.

The decision by Julie Gardner, Head of Drama for BBC Wales, to film and produce the 2005 revived version of Doctor Who in Wales is widely seen as a bellwether moment for the industry for the nation. This in turn was followed by the opening of the Roath Lock production studios in Cardiff. Recent English language programmes that have been filmed in Wales include Sherlock and His Dark Materials, while other popular series, such as Hinterland (Y Gwyll) and Keeping Faith (Un Bore Mercher) have been filmed in both Welsh and English.

=== Film ===
The Cinema of Wales comprises the art of film and creative movies made in Wales or by Welsh filmmakers either locally or abroad. Welsh cinema began in the late-19th century, led by Welsh-based director William Haggar. Wales continued to produce film of varying quality throughout the 20th century, in both the Welsh and English languages, though indigenous production was curtailed through a lack of infrastructure and finance, which prevented the growth of the industry nationally. Despite this, Wales has been represented in all fields of the film making process, producing actors and directors of note.

=== Music ===
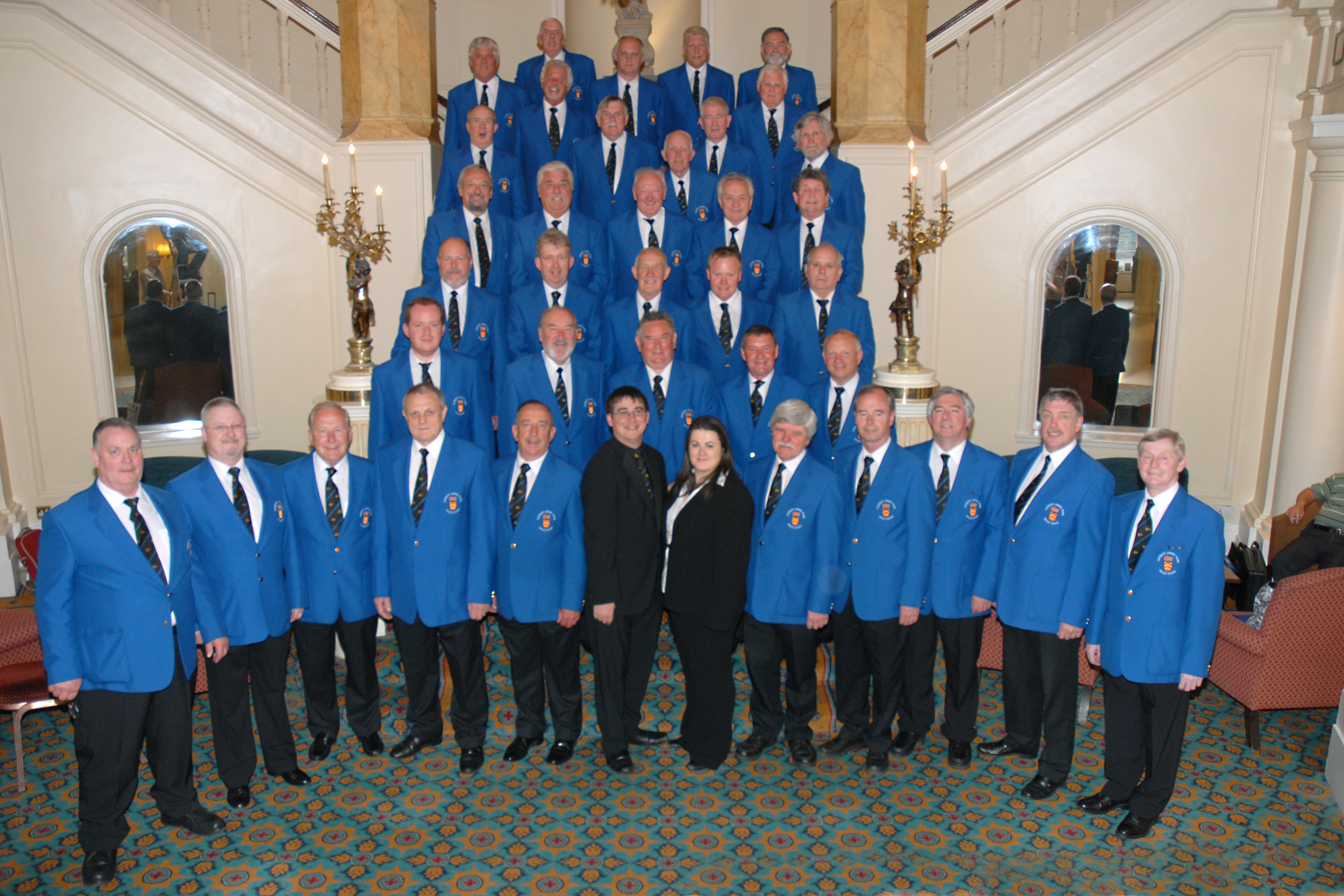
The Cardiff Arms Park male voice choir

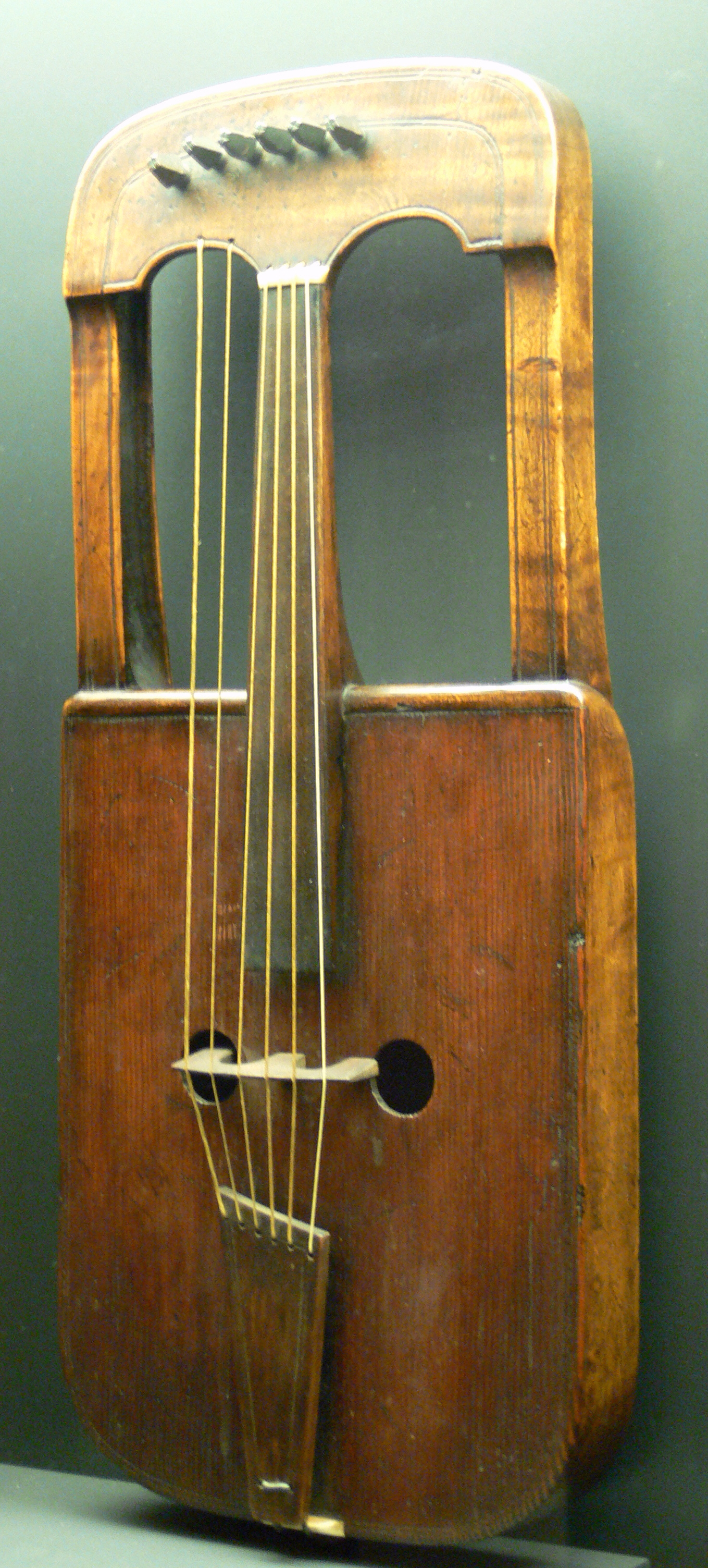
Medieval crwth instrument

Wales is often referred to as "the land of song", and is notable for its harpists, male choirs, and solo artists. The principal Welsh festival of music and poetry is the annual National Eisteddfod. The Llangollen International Eisteddfod echoes the National Eisteddfod but provides an opportunity for the singers and musicians of the world to perform. Traditional music and dance in Wales is supported by many societies. The Welsh Folk Song Society has published a number of collections of songs and tunes.

Male choirs (sometimes called male voice choirs), which emerged in the 19th century, have remained a lasting tradition in Wales. Originally these choirs were formed as the tenor and bass sections of chapel choirs, and embraced the popular secular hymns of the day. Many of the historic Welsh choirs survive, singing a mixture of traditional and popular songs. Traditional instruments of Wales include telyn deires (triple harp), fiddle, crwth, pibgorn (hornpipe) and other instruments. The Cerdd Dant Society promotes its specific singing art primarily through an annual one-day festival. The BBC National Orchestra of Wales performs in Wales and internationally. The Welsh National Opera is based at the Wales Millennium Centre in Cardiff Bay, while the National Youth Orchestra of Wales was the first of its type in the world.

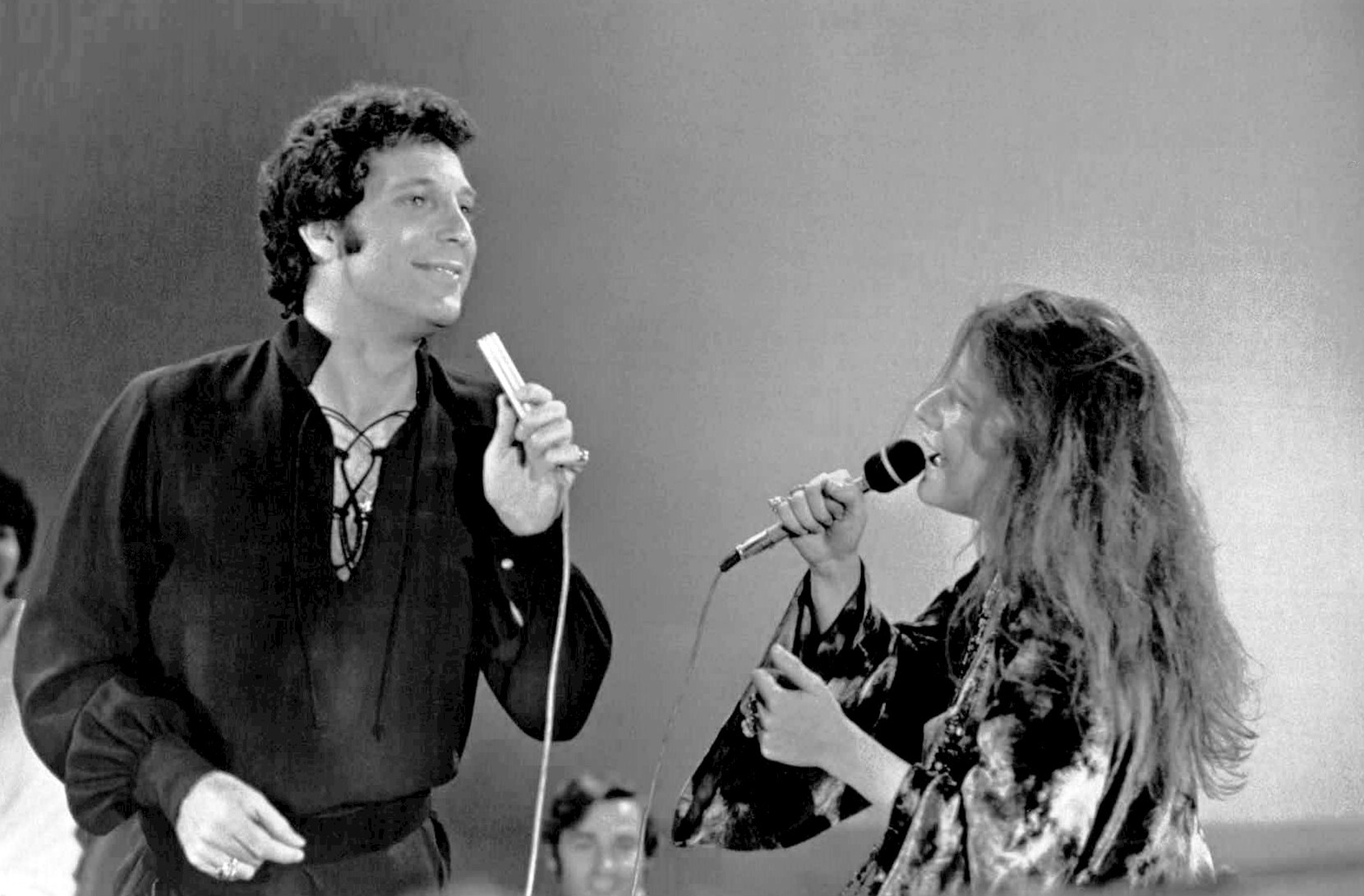
Tom Jones performing with Janis Joplin in 1969

Wales has had a number of successful singers. In the 1960s, these included bands such as Amen Corner and The Iveys/Badfinger and singers including Sir Tom Jones, Dame Shirley Bassey and Mary Hopkin. By the 1980s, indie pop and alternative rock bands such as The Alarm, The Pooh Sticks and The Darling Buds were popular in their genres. But the wider view at the time was that the wider Welsh music scene was stagnant, as the more popular musicians from Wales were from earlier eras.

In the 1990s, in England, the Britpop scene was emerging, while in Wales, bands such as Y Cyrff and Ffa Coffi Pawb began to sing in English, starting a culture that would lead to the creation of Catatonia and the Super Furry Animals. The influence of the 80s bands and the emergence of a Welsh language and dual language music scene locally in Wales led to a dramatic shift in opinion across the United Kingdom as the "Cool Cymru" bands of the period emerged. The leading Welsh band during this period was the Manic Street Preachers, whose 1996 album Everything Must Go has been listed among the greatest albums of all time.

Some of those bands have had ongoing success, while the general popularity of Welsh music during this period led to a resurgence of singers such as Tom Jones with his album Reload. It was his first non-compilation number one album since 1968's Delilah. Meanwhile, Shirley Bassey reached the top 20 once more in the UK Charts with her collaboration with the Propellerheads on the single "History Repeating". They also introduced new acts, such as Catatonia's Owen Powell working with Duffy during her early period. Moving into the 21st century, Bullet For My Valentine were named the Best British Band at the Kerrang! Awards for three years running. Other successful bands from this period include Funeral For A Friend, and Lostprophets.

== Media ==
Television is the most common source of news in Wales, used by 75% of people, with radio used by 43%, 33% using printed newspapers and 31% using websites and apps. In 2020, 46% of people gained their news from social media, which is largely unregulated but includes some news from regulated sources.

== Sport ==
Over fifty national governing bodies regulate and organise their sports in Wales. Most of those involved in competitive sports select, organise and manage individuals or teams to represent their country at international events or fixtures against other countries. Wales is represented at major world sporting events such as the FIFA World Cup, the Rugby World Cup and the Commonwealth Games. At the Olympic Games, Welsh athletes compete alongside those of Scotland, England and Northern Ireland as part of a Great Britain team.

Rugby union is seen as a symbol of Welsh identity and an expression of national consciousness and is a large part of the culture. Wales has the largest proportion of rugby union supporters of any European nation, with 44% of Welsh people enjoying the sport, making it the most popular sport in Wales. The Welsh national rugby union team takes part in the annual Six Nations Championship and has also competed in every Rugby World Cup, with Wales hosting the 1999 tournament. The five professional sides that replaced the traditional club sides in major competitions in 2003 were in turn replaced in 2004 by the four regions: Scarlets; Cardiff Blues; Newport Gwent Dragons; and the Ospreys. The Welsh regional teams play in the Pro14 league, the Anglo-Welsh Cup (LV Cup), the European Heineken Cup and the European (Amlin) Challenge Cup.

Wales has had its own association football league since 1992. For historical and other reasons, four Welsh clubs (Cardiff City, Swansea City, Wrexham, and Newport County) play in the English Football League. Another Welsh club plays in English football's feeder leagues: Merthyr Town. This also qualifies those teams to compete for England's domestic trophies. On 23 April 1927, Cardiff City became the only team outside England to win the FA Cup. In European football competitions, only teams playing in the Welsh leagues are eligible to play for Wales. The five teams in the English leagues are eligible to represent England only, and they are not allowed to compete for domestic Welsh trophies.

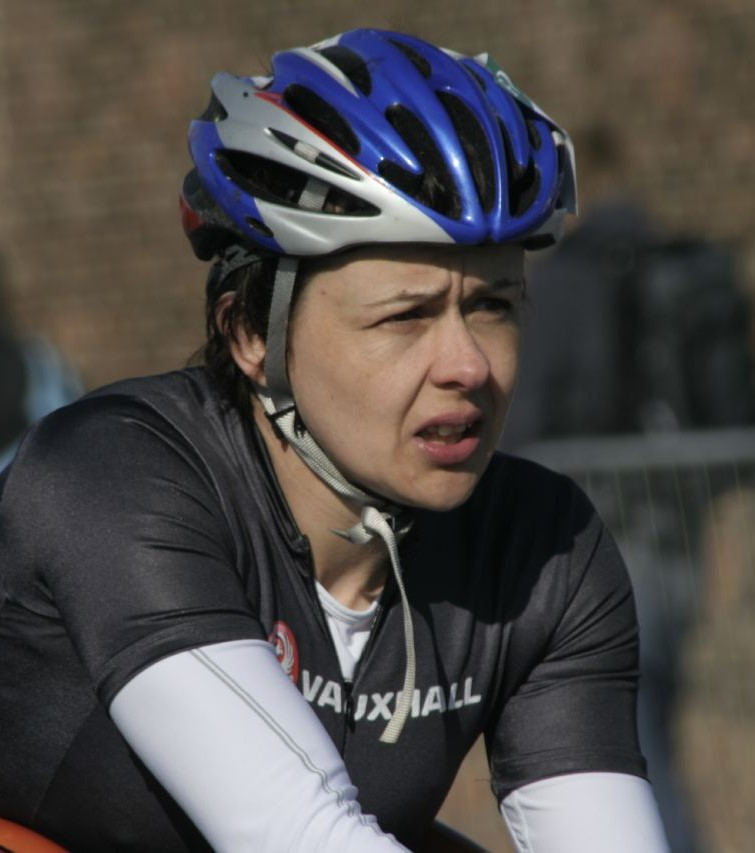
Welsh athlete Tanni Grey-Thompson won 11 Paralympic gold medals.

In international cricket, Wales and England field a single representative team, administered by the England and Wales Cricket Board (ECB), called the England cricket team, or simply "England". Occasionally, a separate Wales national cricket team plays in limited-overs competitions, mainly against English county teams. Glamorgan is the only Welsh participant in the England and Wales County Championship. Plaid Cymru have argued that Wales should have its own international team and withdraw from the existing arrangement under which Welsh players play for England. The proposal has aroused opposition from Cricket Wales and Glamorgan County Cricket Club, who argue such a move would be financially disastrous. The debate focused on a report produced by the Welsh National Assembly's petitions committee, which reflected the arguments on both sides. Bethan Jenkins, Plaid Cymru's spokesperson on heritage, culture, sport and broadcasting, and a member of the petitions committee, said: "Cricket Wales and Glamorgan CCC say the idea of a Welsh national cricket team is 'an emotive subject'. Of course having a national team is emotive. You only have to look at the stands during any national game to see that. To suggest this as anything other than natural is a bit of a misleading argument." In their strategic plan, Cricket Wales state they are "committed to continuing to play a major role within the ECB"

Wales has produced several world-class participants in individual sports, including snooker players Ray Reardon, Terry Griffiths, Mark Williams and Matthew Stevens. Successful track athletes include miler Jim Alford who was a world record holder in the 4 x 1500 metres relay, the 110-metre hurdler Colin Jackson who is a former world record holder and the winner of numerous Olympic, World and European medals, and Tanni Grey-Thompson who has won 11 Paralympic gold medals. Wales has also produced a number of world-class boxers. Joe Calzaghe was WBO World Super-Middleweight Champion and then won the WBA, WBC and Ring Magazine super-middleweight and Ring Magazine Light-Heavyweight titles. Other former boxing world champions include Enzo Maccarinelli, Freddie Welsh, Howard Winstone, Percy Jones, Jimmy Wilde, Steve Robinson and Robbie Regan.

== Cuisine ==
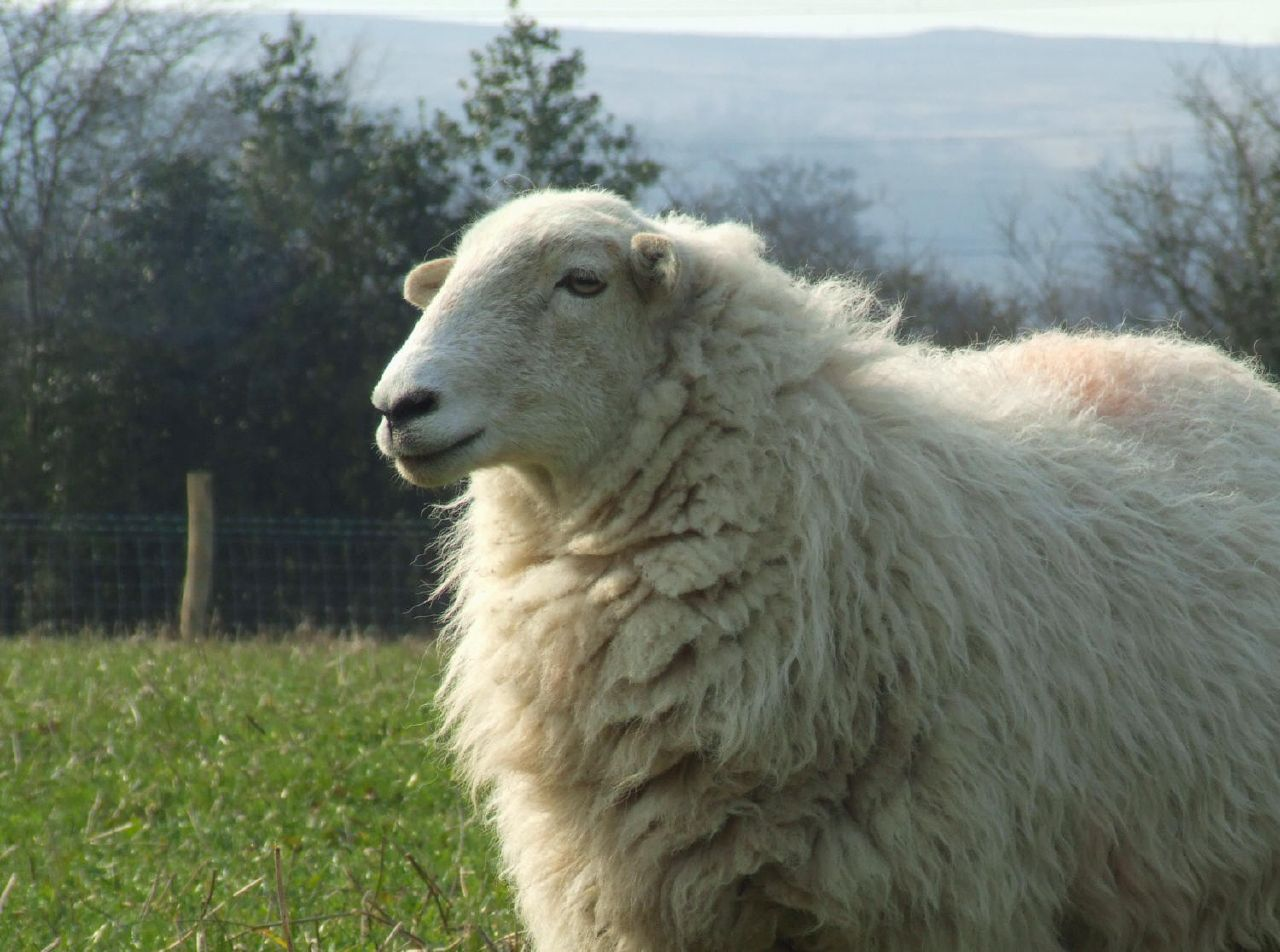
A white Welsh Mountain sheep

Welsh cuisine is internationally renowned; Welsh lamb, Welsh cakes, and dishes such as bara brith remain exports synonymous with quality and flavour. Some say that some other Welsh dishes are said to be similar to English cuisine in style. However, there are regional variations in the food seen across Wales, which can be traced historically to the availability of certain crops and produce in specific areas of the country. The cuisine of Gower is particularly different to the rest of Wales. It was strongly influenced by Somerset and Devon, and developed dishes such as whitepot while ingredients such as pumpkin were used, which are unusual in the rest of Wales.

Cattle farming produces the majority of Wales's agricultural output. Welsh beef is protected under European Union law, meaning that it must be produced and slaughtered in Wales. Welsh pigs are raised, providing good cuts of meat. The mountainous areas of Wales are suited to sheep farming and this has led to an association of their meat with the country. The mutton of Wales has been popular in the rest of the United Kingdom since the 16th century, and by the end of the 20th century there were more than 11 million sheep in Wales.

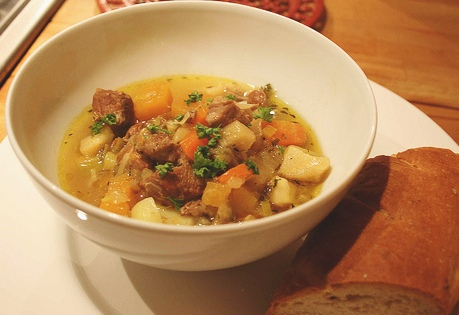
Cawl, a Welsh dish of meat and vegetables

Several Welsh dishes are thought of as Welsh because their ingredients are associated with Wales, whereas others have been developed there. Cawl is regarded as the Welsh national dish; it is a slow-cooked meat and vegetable broth. Traditionally it was a vegetable-heavy dish, but now it is more likely to contain beef or lamb. Welsh rarebit is thought to date from the 18th century, although the original term "Welsh rabbit" may have been intended as a slur against the Welsh. Another use of cheese in a traditional Welsh dish is seen in Glamorgan sausage, which is a skinless sausage made of cheese and either leek or spring onion, which is then rolled into a sausage shape before frying. Laverbread is made using a purée of seaweed, and is traditionally served in a Welsh breakfast. Welsh cakes are made on a bakestone, and are small round spiced cakes containing raisins, sultanas and occasionally currants. Bara brith contains similar ingredients to Welsh cakes, but is similar to a tea bread.

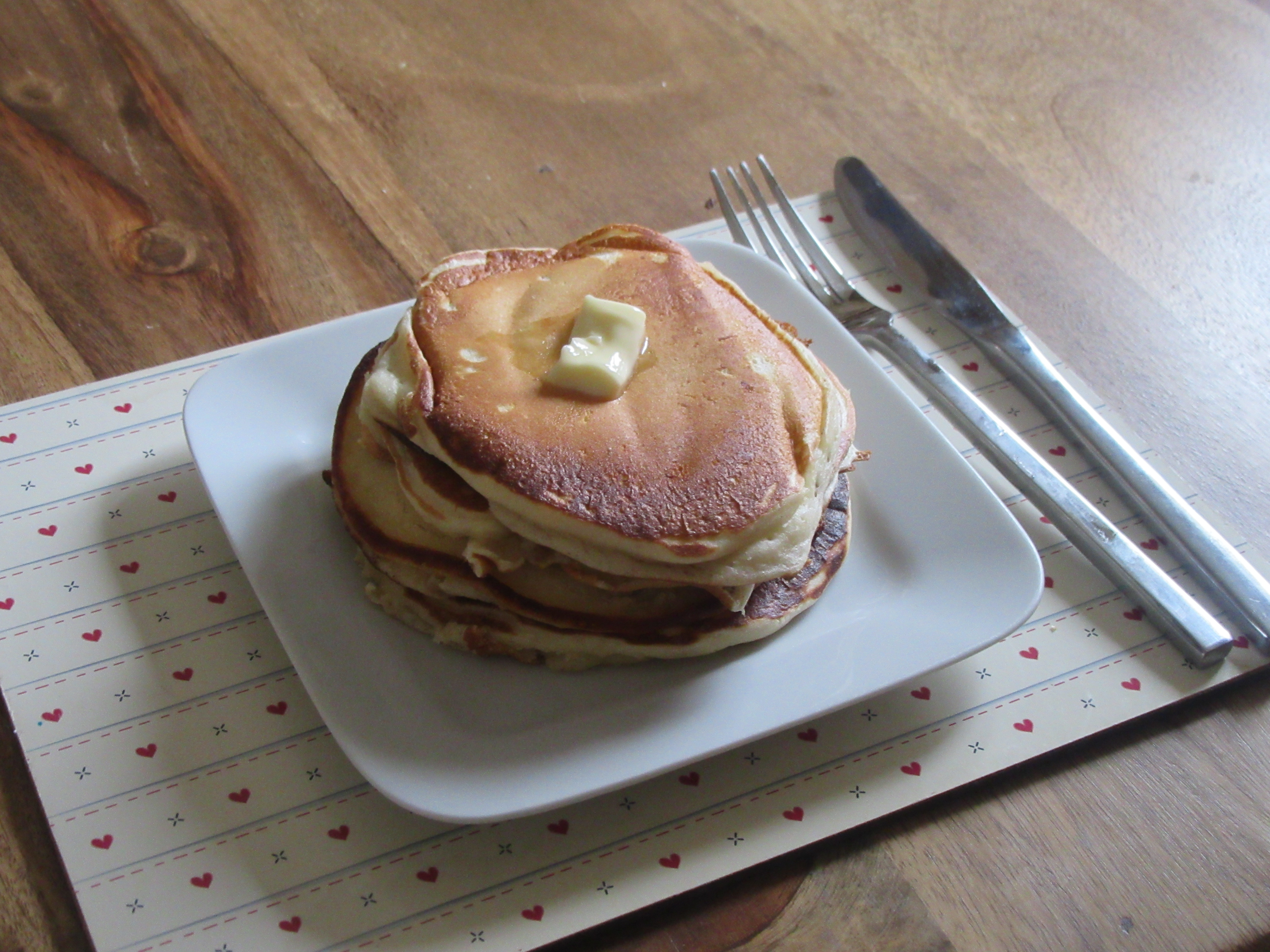
Crempog - Anglesey style

The Welsh have their own versions of pancakes: crempogau (sing. crempog) (sometimes called ffroes, sing. ffroesen) are traditionally layered on top of each other to form a large cake. Some are very much like American pancakes; others may be made with yeast (called crempogau burum, sing. crempog furum) or oatmeal (although this is also true of American pancakes) and some are like Scotch pancakes.

Beer is the national drink of Wales, despite the influence of the link to temperance movement in Wales. The Wrexham Lager Beer Company was the first successful lager producer in Britain when it opened in 1882, and the Felinfoel Brewery was the first brewery in Europe to put beer in cans. Whisky production in Wales was historically a niche industry, and completely shut down in 1910 when the last distillery was bought out by a Scottish firm. However, the Penderyn distillery produced the first Wales-created whisky in a century to go on sale when it was launched in 2004. There are 20 Welsh vineyards producing 100,000 bottles of wine a year in total.

== Government policy ==
In February 2002, Liberal Democrat Culture Minister Jenny Randerson announced a 10-year strategy "to achieve a cultural transformation in Wales", called "Creative Future: Cymru Creadigol". The plan boosted support for the Arts Council of Wales and the cultural forum Cymru'n Creu, launched in 2001 to bring together the arts, tourism, and sport sectors. As the creative industries and cultural tourism have economic impact, these agencies would work together with the Welsh Development Agency and the Wales Tourist Board. As of March 2006 there was no new cultural strategy for Wales, although a review was anticipated.

== See also ==
- Architecture of Wales
- Cool Cymru
- Culture of Gwynedd during the High Middle Ages
- Welsh mythology
- List of Welsh people
