= Y Ladi Wen =

Celtic mythology apparition

Y Ladi Wen (Welsh for 'the white lady'), or Y Ddynes Mewn Gwyn (Welsh for 'the woman in white'), is an apparition of Welsh mythology, dressed in white, and is most commonly seen at Hollantide and the festival of Calan Gaeaf. Known in Welsh oral tradition, she is evoked to warn children about bad behaviour. Y Ladi Wen is characterised in various ways including being a terrifying ghost who may ask for help if you speak to her, or she may offer treasure or gold.

Y Ladi Wen is commonly connected with the villages of Ogmore, Ewenny (where she gives her name to White Lady's Meadow and White Lady's Lane) and St Athan.

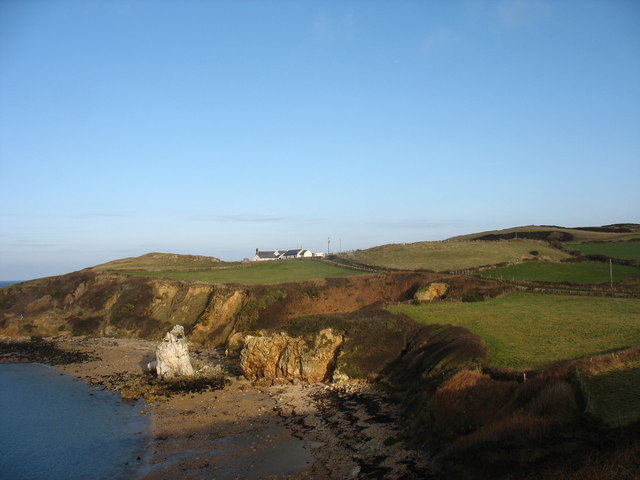
Traeth y Ladi Wen (White Lady Beach)

== History ==
The Welsh folklorist, Marie Trevelyan stated that stories of Y Ladi Wen were innumerable and widespread, stating that "every county of the Principality has several of these apparitions." Some variations of Y Ladi Wen cast her as the ghostly guardian of some great buried treasure.

== Brecknockshire ==
Two separate legends of Y Ladi Wen are recorded around Brecon, in one story sightings of a woman clothed in white near the town are commonly told, and a curious local farmer decides to go and see the apparition for himself. He finds Y Ladi Wen scattering seeds, but is so terrified at the sight that he is about to run away when she speaks. Addressing him kindly, she begs him to return to her and gave him a handful of leek seeds. Fear-stricken, the farmer places the seeds into his pocket and thanks her. However, on the return home the farmer decides to throw the seeds away. At home, the farmer finds several grains of gold in the pocket that had contained the seeds. He never sees Y Ladi Wen again.

Another story of a farmer meeting Y Ladi Wen is associated with the old Roman fort at Y Gaer. In this version, a ploughman is working day to day in a large field near "Caer Bannau" (the former Roman fort). In the course of his work he notices "a maiden robed in white, smoothing her hair in the sunshine, and beckoning the man to her". The ploughman tries to ignore the apparition at first, but she repeatedly signals to him until he finally musters up the courage to respond.

The maiden informs the ploughman that she is the ghost of a princess, who had been sunk into the ground by a landslip. She tells the ploughman that to save her, he must carry her to the nearest churchyard, that he must not halt or even looking round and that he must throw her down with all his might into the holy ground. Upon hearing this, the ploughman promptly picks up Y Ladi Wen, and carrying her across his shoulders, begins to run with her to the nearest church. At the churchyard, the ploughman is about to fling her into the ground when something tweaks his ears so violently that he is forced to look round, letting his burden fall. At this, the maiden flies into the air, lamenting that she now must suffer even more severely, and wait a hundred years for a man with a more steady hand.

== Glamorgan ==
=== St Athan ===
One popular version of the apparition is connected with the village of St Athan, where a number of local people are said to have witnessed the appearance of a lady dressed in white when passing a certain location at night. The story is sometimes connected to Gwenllian Berkerolles, a Norman noblewoman who is said to have been sentenced by the ruling Norman Lord to be buried alive. Upon his return from the second crusade, Sir Jasper accuses his wife of infidelity and devises a cruel punishment for her. The Lady is then buried up to her neck in a field not far from Sir Jasper's castle, where she suffered for ten days before expiring. It is then revealed that Sir Jasper has fallen for the misinformation of his wife's enemies, with the knight only finding proof of his wife's innocence after her death. The revelation sends Sir Jasper into madness.

Marie Trevelyan recorded a description of the St Athan Y Ladi Wen as "the apparition of a slim and graceful lady, whose white silken robes trailed in the dewy grass, seen in the early mornings. She never appeared in the night, but always soon after dawn during the summer months." Trevelyan also records an account given by a local women in 1863 who claimed to often see "a beautiful lady dressed in white going 'round and round' a certain spot in the field." As with other versions of Y Ladi Wen, the location of these sightings are often thought to be the place of a lady's untimely death, with the turning on the road from the St Athans to Llantwit Major being cited as one such place.

=== Ewenny ===
The village of Ewenny, has a number of legends associated with Y Ladi Wen. Marie Trevelyan recorded a number of accounts claiming that a woman in white could be seen around the village, appearing wringing her hands in despair or pointing and guiding people to the same, unvarying location.

In one account, Y Ladi Wen appeared to a certain man, he was not scared or frightened, but spoke to her calmly, offering her his assistance. The lady is relieved by the offer and replies that if the man could just hold her tightly in his arms then all of her problems would be solved. The story ends unhappily, as the man began to carry out her wish, he was startled into letting her go when a dog loudly barked upon seeing the two figures. At this Y Ladi Wen unleashed a scream and states "I shall be bound for another seven years!" In another version of the story, the man again offers his help but Y Ladi Wen simply ask him to take her hand. The two then walk a short distance before Y Ladi Wen disappears.

=== Ogmore Castle ===
Near to Ewenny, the village of Ogmore has a number of similar but distinct story of Y Ladi Wen. Here, a spirit was long said to wander the area until a man finally had the courage to approach her. When such a man eventually did so, the spirit led him to a treasure (a cauldron filled with gold) hidden under a heavy stone within the old tower of Ogmore Castle, and allowed the man to take half the treasure for himself. However, the man later returned and took the more of the treasure. This angered the spirit, who, with her fingers turning into claws, attacked the man as he returned home. The man became gravely ill, but only died once he had confessed his greed. After that, an ailment known as "Y Ladi Wen's revenge" was said to befall any person who died prior to disclosing hidden treasure.

=== Llantrisant ===
Y Ladi Wen is also associated with the village of Rhiwsaeson, near Llantrisant. Trevelyan records an account of a local farm labourer who saw her upon his way home one evening. In this version, Y Ladi Wen approaches the man and speaks, stating "Your wife has given birth to a babe. Go and bring the boy to me at once, that I may be saved." Unsure of what to do, the man speaks to a parson who advises him to do as instructed, but suggests that the infant is christened first so that at least the child's soul will be saved. The man returns with his child to the same place to find Y Ladi Wen already there, crying. It is revealed that she only needed the kiss of an unbaptized new-born for her soul to be redeemed.

Another account of Y Ladi Wen is associated with Llantrisant Mountain where a shepherd watches a white-robed girl scattering roses while he shelters from the midday summer sun. Believing the girl has left, the shepherd makes his way to the flowers and gathers them up. Upon this, Y Ladi Wen reappears, while she always remains silent although she looks at the shepherd "kindly", but "smiling sadly". The Shepherd then takes the flowers home and placed them in water, only to wake in the morning and find three gold coins where the flowers had been.
