= Ewenny =

Village in the Vale of Glamorgan, Wales

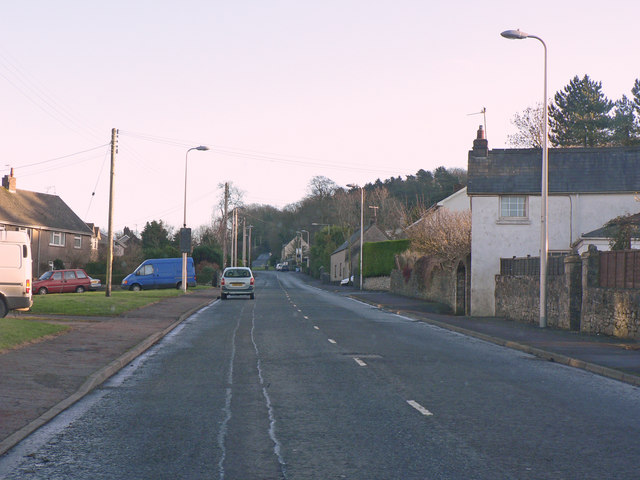

- Location within the Vale of Glamorgan
- Population: 768 (2011)
- OS grid reference: SS906771
- Principal area: Vale of Glamorgan
- Preserved county: South Glamorgan
- Country: Wales
- Sovereign state: United Kingdom
- Post town: Bridgend
- Postcode district: CF35
- Police: South Wales
- Fire: South Wales
- Ambulance: Welsh
- UK Parliament: Vale of Glamorgan
- Senedd Cymru – Welsh Parliament: Vale of Glamorgan
- List of places UK Wales Vale of Glamorgan 51.48224°N 3.57686°W Map of the community

Ewenny (Welsh: Ewenni) is a village and community on the River Ewenny in the Vale of Glamorgan, Wales.

Over the years the village has grown into the neighbouring village of Corntown to such an extent that there is no longer a clear boundary between the two. The nearest town of significant size is Bridgend, 2 mi (3.2 km) away. Corntown is within the community.

In 1987, scenes from the Doctor Who episode Delta and the Bannermen were filmed in the village.

== History ==
=== Ewenny Priory ===
The village grew around the Priory and Church. The Norman church of St. Michael was built in the 12th century by one of the Norman knights of Glamorgan, William de Londres. His son Maurice founded the adjacent Benedictine priory in 1141 when he granted the church to the abbey of St. Peter at Gloucester, together with the churches of St Brides Major, St. Michael at Colwinston and the manor at Lampha.

The priory is widely regarded as one of the finest fortified religious buildings in Britain. Over the centuries the priory has sustained some damage, but nonetheless it is still inhabited by its current owners, the Turbervill family. The priory is not open to the public but the attached Church is still in use today.

=== Potteries ===
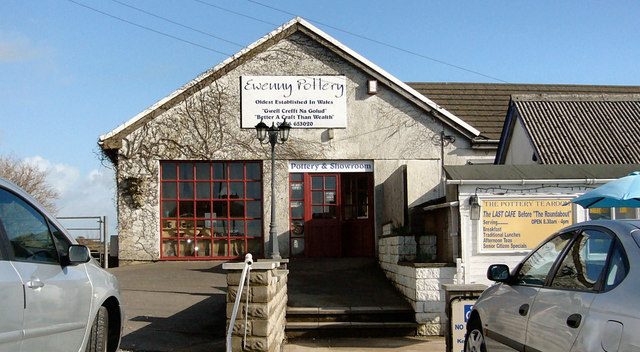
Ewenny Pottery and showrooms, the oldest working pottery in Wales

Records show that the pottery industry has existed in the area since 1427. This is probably because the materials required for the production of pottery are readily available in this area, including a local red earthenware, glaze materials, stone to build the kilns and coal to fire the pots in the kilns. There have been fifteen potteries in the Ewenny area at one time or another, all small family concerns.

The village is home to the Ewenny Pottery, founded in 1610 and the oldest working pottery in Wales. The business is run by the descendants of the pottery's original founders, the Jenkins family.

=== Y Ladi Wen ===
Ewenny is associated with Y Ladi Wen (Welsh for 'the white lady') apparition of Welsh folklore. In 1909, Marie Trevelyan recorded a number of local accounts claiming that a woman in white could be seen around the village. The figure was said to appear either wringing her hands in despair or more commonly, pointing or guiding people to the same, unvarying location.

One popular legend recounts that when Y Ladi Wen appeared to a certain man, he was not scared or frightened, but spoke to her calmly, offering her his assistance. The lady is relieved by the offer and replies that if the man could just hold her tightly in his arms then all of her problems would be solved. The story ends unhappily, as the man began to carry out her wish, he was startled into letting her go when a dog loudly barked upon seeing the two figures. At this Y Ladi Wen unleashed a scream and states "I shall be bound for another seven years!" In another version of the story, the man again offers his help but Y Ladi Wen simply ask him to take her hand. The two then walk a short distance before Y Ladi Wen disappears.

Sightings of another version of Y Ladi Wen are recorded at the nearby Ogmore Castle. However, the Ewenny version is invariably linked with the vicinity of Ewenny Priory, with the figure appearing to people on "White Lady's Lane" and guiding or pointing them to a place on "White Lady's meadow".

== Other Points of Interest ==
The nearby Coed-y-Bwl nature reserve has around a quarter of a million ‘wild’ daffodils. The reserve was established in 1971 and in 1975 received a Prince of Wales trust award. The daffodils were planted in the early 19th century by Mrs Nicholl of Merthyr Mawr.

A Roman bridge is situated near the reserve.

== Governance ==
Ewenny has a community council which elects or co-opts eight community councillors. Until 2022 the community was part of the county ward of Llandow/Ewenny for elections to the Vale of Glamorgan Council. It was transferred to the St Brides Major ward as a result of recommendations from the Local Democracy and Boundary Commission for Wales.

== See also ==
- List of monasteries dissolved by Henry VIII of England

== Images ==
- Priory interior
- Priory Exterior
- St. Michael's Church
- The Village Shop
- Ewenny River
