= List of Welsh dishes =

Welsh dishes as a whole are generally associated with simplicity. Welsh cookery is thought to be similar to English cuisine in style. There are few written records of Welsh foods, recipes were instead held within families and passed down orally between the women of the family. Those with the skills and inclination to write Welsh recipes, the upper classes, conformed to English styles and therefore would not have run their houses with traditional Welsh cuisine. Despite being poorly recorded, the traditional cookery of Wales does exist. It finds its roots in the day to day meals of peasant folk, unlike other cultures where the meals would start in the kitchens of the gentry and would be adapted for poorer plates.

== Welsh dishes ==
Name	Image	Description
Bara brith		Bara brith is a fruit loaf originating from rural Wales, where they used a mortar and pestle to grind the fresh sweet spices. Historically it was made with yeast and butter, though recently it is likely to be made with bicarbonate of soda and margarine. The fruit included would be dried raisins, currants, sultanas and candied peel, which would be soaked in cold tea before cooking. Generally served sliced with butter during afternoon tea, it is often known as Welsh tea bread. Bara brith translates to "speckled bread", but it is also known as teisen dorth ("loaf cake") in South Wales, or as torta negra when Welsh settlers brought it to Argentina.
Cawl		Cawl, pronounced "Kah-ool", can be regarded as Wales' national dish. Dating back to the 11th century, originally it was a simple broth of meat (most likely lamb) and vegetables, it could be cooked slowly over the course of the day whilst the family was out working the fields. It could be made in stages, over a number of days, first by making a meat stock, then by adding the vegetables on the following day. Once cooked, the fat could be skimmed from the top of the pot, then it would be served as two separate dishes, first as a soup, then as a stew. Leftovers could be topped up with fresh vegetables, sometimes over the course of weeks. During the 18th and 19th centuries, the amount of meat used in the broth was minimal; instead it was bulked out with potatoes. Today, cawl would be much more likely to include beef or lamb for the meat, and may be served with plain oatmeal dumplings or currant dumplings known as trollies. Traditionally cawl would be eaten with a "specially-carved wooden spoon" and eaten from a wooden bowl.
Cocos (Cockles)		Cockles were harvested and sold at markets in South Wales throughout the 19th and 20th centuries. They are sometimes served with bread, or cooked with egg.
Crempog		Crempogau (plural of crempog) are thick pancakes, made with buttermilk, oats and dried fruit. Variations include crempog furum (with yeast), crempog wen (with refined flour) and crempog surgeirch (oatmeal based)
Faggots		Welsh meatballs made from lamb or pig's liver, onions and a cereal binder. Using offcuts and offal made faggots cheap to make and popular within Welsh homes.
Glamorgan sausage		The Glamorgan sausage is a Welsh vegetarian sausage. It contains no meat or skin, instead it is made with cheese, generally Caerphilly, but sometimes cheddar, along with leek or spring onion. This mixture is then coated in breadcrumbs and rolled into a sausage shape before cooking.
Laverbread		Laverbread, or Bara Lawr, is a Welsh speciality. It is made by cooking porphyra seaweed slowly for up to ten hours until it becomes a purée known as laver. The seaweed can also be cooked with oatmeal to make laverbread. It can be served with bacon and cockles as a breakfast dish, or fried in small patties. Today, laverbread is commercially produced by washing in water, cooking for about 5 hours before chopping, salting and packaging.
Leek soup		Leek soup, or in Welsh, Cawl Cennin has been recorded as far back as 1794 and the dish is popular during Saint David's Day celebrations.
Lobscaws		A popular stew in Holyhead and Anglesey, it is variation of Cawl, made using leftovers from other meals.
Pottage		Pottage started as meat veg & cereal in water pot. In medieval times it changed to being entirely made with cereal (i.e. porridge). Leeks and onions used for flavouring.
Roast lamb with laver sauce		A variation on roast lamb, that incorporates laverbread as a sauce.
Shepherd's pie		A type of lamb meat pie made with mashed potatoes, is often associated with Wales.
Tatws Pum Munud		Tatws Pum Munud, or in English: five minute potatoes, is a traditional Welsh stew, made with potatoes, vegetables and bacon, and cooked on top of the stove.
Tatws Popty		Tatws Popty, or in English, oven potatoes, a traditional Welsh casserole, made with potatoes, vegetables and a joint of meat, and cooked in an oven.
Teisen Nionod		Teisen Nionod is a form of onion cake made by layering thinly sliced potatoes and onions. This was often served with either beef or lamb.
Teisennau Tatws		Teisennau Tatws are a form of potato cakes, traditionally cooked on a bake stone or griddle.
Welsh cake		Welsh cakes, or pice ar y maen meaning "cakes on the stone", are small round spiced cakes, traditionally cooked on a bakestone, but more recently on a griddle. Once cooked, they can be eaten hot or cold, on their own or topped either with sugar or butter. The dough which is mixed with raisins, sultanas and sometime currants, is similar to shortbread, meaning they can have the consistency of biscuits when cooked on the griddle, and slightly more like a cake when cooked in the oven.
Welsh rarebit		The predilection of the Welsh for roasted cheese led to the dish of Welsh rarebit, or Welsh rabbit, seasoned melted cheese poured over toasted bread. The cheese would need to be a harder one, such as cheddar or similar. Referred to as Welsh rabbit as early as 1725, the name is not similar to the Welsh term caws pobi. Welsh folk rarely ate rabbit due to the cost and because landowners would not allow rabbit hunting, so the term is more likely a slur on the Welsh. The name evolved from rabbit to rarebit, possibly to remove the slur from Welsh cuisine or due to simple reinterpretation of the word to make menus more pleasant.

== Sources ==
- Freeman, Bobby (1996). First Catch Your Peacock: Her Classic Guide to Welsh Food (illustrated, reprint, revised ed.). Y Lolfa. ISBN 978-0-86243-315-4.
- Webb, Andrew (2012). Food Britannia. Random House. ISBN 978-1-4090-2222-0.
- Davidson, Alan (2014). Jaine, Tom (ed.). The Oxford Companion to Food (Illustrated ed.). Oxford University Press. ISBN 978-0-19-967733-7.
- Davidson, Alan (1981). Davidson, Alan (ed.). National & Regional Styles of Cookery: Proceedings : Oxford Symposium 1981 (Reprint ed.). Oxford Symposium. ISBN 978-0-907325-07-9.
