= Ewenny Pottery =

Welsh pottery

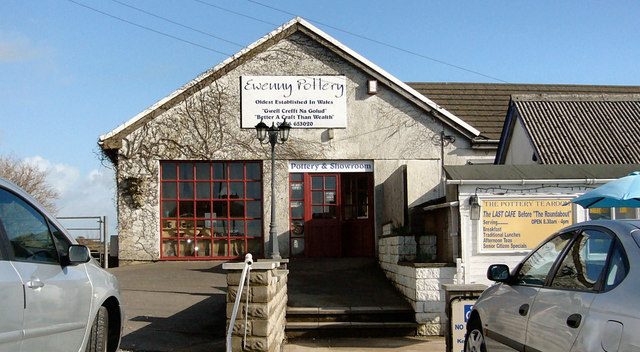
- Ewenny Pottery and showrooms
- Company type: Private
- Industry: Ceramics
- Founded: 1610
- Headquarters: Ewenny, Bridgend, Wales
- Area served: Global
- Key people: Evan Jenkins (1st generation); David John Jenkins (5th generation); Alun & Jayne Jenkins (7th generation); Caitlin Jenkins (8th generation)
- Products: Pottery
- Owner: Alun & Jayne Jenkins
- Number of employees: 3
- Website: www.ewennypottery.com

Ewenny Pottery, founded in 1610 in the village of Ewenny, is the oldest working pottery in Wales.

== Background ==
The village of Ewenny is sited above all of the natural resources to make the local red earthenware pottery: clay deposited from the ice age; wood and coal for firing; glaze materials; and stone to build the kilns. Since 1427, there have been fifteen potteries in the Ewenny area at one time or another, all small family concerns.

== Foundation ==
The Ewenny Pottery was founded in 1610, probably by farmers in the area looking to make commercial use of the clay. In the early 1800s Evan Jenkins married Mary, the daughter of then owner John Morgan, and so started the Jenkins family period of ownership that continues to this present day. The products at this time would have been mainly for agricultural and local use, plus occasional commissions. At this time, the number of potteries in the area was at its height, but quickly dwindled due to the onset of cheap enamelware and china imports from the Far East.

=== Horace W Elliot ===
In 1883 at the height of the Arts and Crafts movement, Bayswater, London based designer and ceramics dealer Horace W Elliot was visiting country potteries looking for pieces to sell in his showrooms. Having struck up a friendship with the Jenkins brothers, he is particularly associated with Ewenny, but also with C.H. Brannam and Bourne Denby.

Elliott made annual visits to Eweny until 1913, designing many pieces for the Jenkins brothers to make. His fleur-de-lys design mark was often applied to Ewenny and other wares, and as a proponent of the Esperanto movement, sometimes inscribed his pots in that language.

=== David John Jenkins ===
In the early 1900s, David John Jenkins was born into the family business. After working with his father in the pottery and uncles at the claypits, he married Martha Arthur whose family had owned the Corntown Pottery, with whom he had seven children.

After buying the Ewenny Pottery from his cousin Edwin II, he invented the classical mottled-glazing technique that is still used by the pottery today. The piece is firstly dipped completely in one glaze, and then splashed with a second glaze. David John Jenkins created the technique as he had noticed that thanks to the railways, there were many more visitors travelling into the countryside looking for a unique and original memento of their excursion.

At the outbreak of World War II, all of his sons were called-up, and he could only fire the kiln when given permission by the Air Raid Warden. He was however regularly commissioned by ROF Bridgend to make one-off and commemorative pieces, with his son Dai given leave of absence on one occasion from the Royal Air Force to help his father fire the kilns.

=== Post WW2 ===
Post the war, and only Dai and Arthur returned to the business. With growth in the business, the partnership could no longer afford to dig its own clay, and so it consolidated to just being a pottery. After the death of David John Jenkins in 1961, the two brothers became co-owners. However, with mass-produced pottery now cheap, the business was in decline.

In 1969, Arthur's eldest son Alun had graduated with a degree in Ceramics from Cardiff College of Art. Wishing to see the business continue, Alun and his wife Jayne started producing pieces in their garage, and then gained a large commission to produce commemorative mugs for the Silver Jubilee of Elizabeth II in 1977.

== Present ==
Alun and Jayne Jenkins (7th generation) continue to produce pieces, together with their daughter Caitlin Jenkins (8th generation) who has a degree in ceramics from the University of Wales Institute Cardiff and a master's degree from the Royal College of Art. The present pottery and showrooms are situated on the site of a former kiln, on the main road through the village of Ewenny.
