= Marie Trevelyan =

Welsh writer and folklorist (1853–1922)

- Born: Emma Mary Thomas; 1853; Llantwit Major, Glamorgan, Wales
- Died: 1922 (aged 68–69)
- Occupations: Author and folklorist
- Writing career
- Genre: Welsh folklore

Emma Mary Paslieu (née Thomas, known by the pen-name Marie Trevelyan) (1853–1922) was a Welsh writer and folklorist. A popular writer of fiction and non-fiction, Trevelyan's work was informed by an extensive collection of oral and written accounts that she collated throughout her life. She popularised a number of tales on Welsh folklore.

== Life ==
Trevelyan was born to Mary and Illtud Thomas at Llantwit Major in the Vale of Glamorgan. Her father (an architect and surveyor), was described as a "prominent local figure" interested in the local traditions of Llantwit Major, he is said to have presented his young daughter with some manuscripts which she would later claim as an important source for her own writings. Illtyd Nicholls (a local gentleman and owner of Llanmaes House), is thought to have also supplemented her father's material with texts from his own collection. Trevelyan was educated at schools in Cardiff and Bristol before moving to London where she became a successful journalist and editor.

In 1880 Trevelyan married a French doctor, C.E. Paslieu and together the couple had one daughter, Branwen. However, Trevelyan was widowed at a young age and returned with her infant daughter to Llantwit Major, living at the family home in Wine Street with her father. Trevelyan's daughter is also said to have spent much time in hospital at Penyfai.

At Llantwit Major, Trevelyan published a range of works from Arthurian tales to Quaker romances. Trevelyan struggled financially after being widowed early in life, but her success as a writer became the means by which she supported her family. Treveyan soon became known throughout Wales and Great Britain for collecting the oral folklore and contemporary accounts of Welsh history, culture and Welsh people.

== Career ==
=== Fiction ===
Trevelyan's most notable novel is perhaps her 1900 work Britain's greatness foretold: the story of Boadicea, the British warrior-queen, which has been described as a mix of historical characters from Roman history and Welsh mythological figures from sources such as the Mabinogion. Juliette Wood argued that the success of the novel "anticipated the mixing of sources found in modern fantasy by writers such as Evangeline Walters and Marion Zimmer Bradley."

=== Folklore ===
Trevelyan is maybe best remembered as the author of Folk-lore and folk-stories of Wales. The work features much Welsh folklore and myths which Trevelyan had spent her lifetime collecting, but had otherwise been unrecorded oral traditions for centuries. While much of her early writing had a focus on her native Glamorgan, Trevelyan collated a wide variety of local knowledge and details from across the nation for this work, corresponding with many informants, studying extant family records and conducting her own fieldwork.

Trevelyan also cites a vast range of authors from Gerald of Wales and Geoffrey of Monmouth to contemporary antiquarians such as Elias Owen, Owen Morgan and Charlotte Guest. Trevelyan's collected a number of oral sources for her work, often referring to her informants by their initials. While this is a standard practice for late Victorian writing, Trevelyan stated that she used this approach to protect their identities.

As such the work encompasses tales of "werewolves and vampires, toad-men and frog-women, fairies, ghosts and demons, against a backdrop of the forests and meadows, rivers and lakes, mountains and caverns, the plants, animals and natural forces which make up the country of Wales", with Charlotte Sophia Burne describing it as "the most important collection of the folklore of the British Isles."

=== Female characters ===
Trevelyan's writing often involved prominent historical women and female characters, often citing other female writers as sources. As well as her novel on Boadicea, Trevelyan published papers on Eurgain (the daughter of Caractacus) and her 1895 work Gwenllian-wen: A story of Chartist Times is a reinterpretation of the local legends she recorded regarding Gwenllian, a historic woman who lived in Kidwelly during the Norman period.

Trevelyan's folkloric writing also featured more female characters, often with supernatural power. Lady Stradling’s Ghost and the White Ladies of Lundy Island are retellings of the ghostly hauntings at St Donat's Castle and on Lundy Island. Trevelyan also recounts a series of tales about supernatural women throughout Wales, including water spirits, several "buried treasure" stories and Y Ladi Wen.

== Death and legacy ==
The National Library of Wales contains some of her work, including hand-written notes on the traditions related to Llanmaes House (NLW 18564C).

Trevelyan died in 1922 and is buried in the churchyard of St. Illtud's Church. The candlesticks inside are dedicated to her memory. The House that Trevelyan, her daughter and her father occupied on Wine Street is still extant.

== Notable works ==
- Glimpses of Welsh life and character (1893, London)
- From Snowdon to the sea: stirring stories of north and south Wales (1894, London)
- Glimpses of Welsh Life and Custom (1894, London)
- Gwenllian-wen: A story of Chartist Times (1895, London)
- The Land of Arthur (1895, London)
- White Ladies of Lundy Island (1895, London)
- Britain's greatness foretold: the story of Boadicea, the British warrior-queen (1900, London)
- Folk-lore and folk-stories of Wales (1909, London)
- Welsh Folk-Stories (1909, London)
- Llantwit Major: its history and antiquities (1910, Newport)
