= Corntown =

Coordinates: 51.4849°N 3.5615°W

Corntown: Welsh: Corntwn
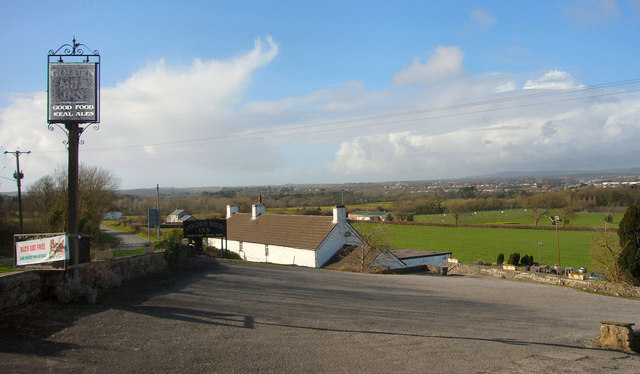

- Location within the Vale of Glamorgan
- OS grid reference: SS917773
- Principal area: Vale of Glamorgan
- Preserved county: South Glamorgan
- Country: Wales
- Sovereign state: United Kingdom
- Postcode district: CF
- Police: South Wales
- Fire: South Wales
- Ambulance: Welsh
- UK Parliament: Vale of Glamorgan
- Senedd Cymru – Welsh Parliament: Vale of Glamorgan

Corntown (Welsh: Corntwn) is a small village in the Vale of Glamorgan. It lies along the B4524 road, just outside Bridgend, 21.6 miles (34.8 km) west of the centre of Cardiff. It has grown around Corntown Farm. Chapel Wood frames part of its western side. The Golden Mile Inn lies along the B4524 just to the northeast of the village.

== History ==
Neolithic implements, especially flints, microliths and leaf arrowheads have been unearthed in the area, indicating an early settlement site nearby off Stony Lane.

In around the 1610s, Edward Lewis of Van came into property in Corntown. The Wescombe family are associated with Corntown and Ewenny. Over the centuries the village has grown into the nearby village of Ewenny to such an extent that there is no longer a clear boundary between the two. Locally the boundary is taken to be between the ancient baptismal pool and the fortified gatehouse. The Grade II listed Corntown Court is a historical house in the village.

On 4 July 1845 Edward Morse was ordained at Corntown.
