= Crempog =

Welsh pancake served for celebrations

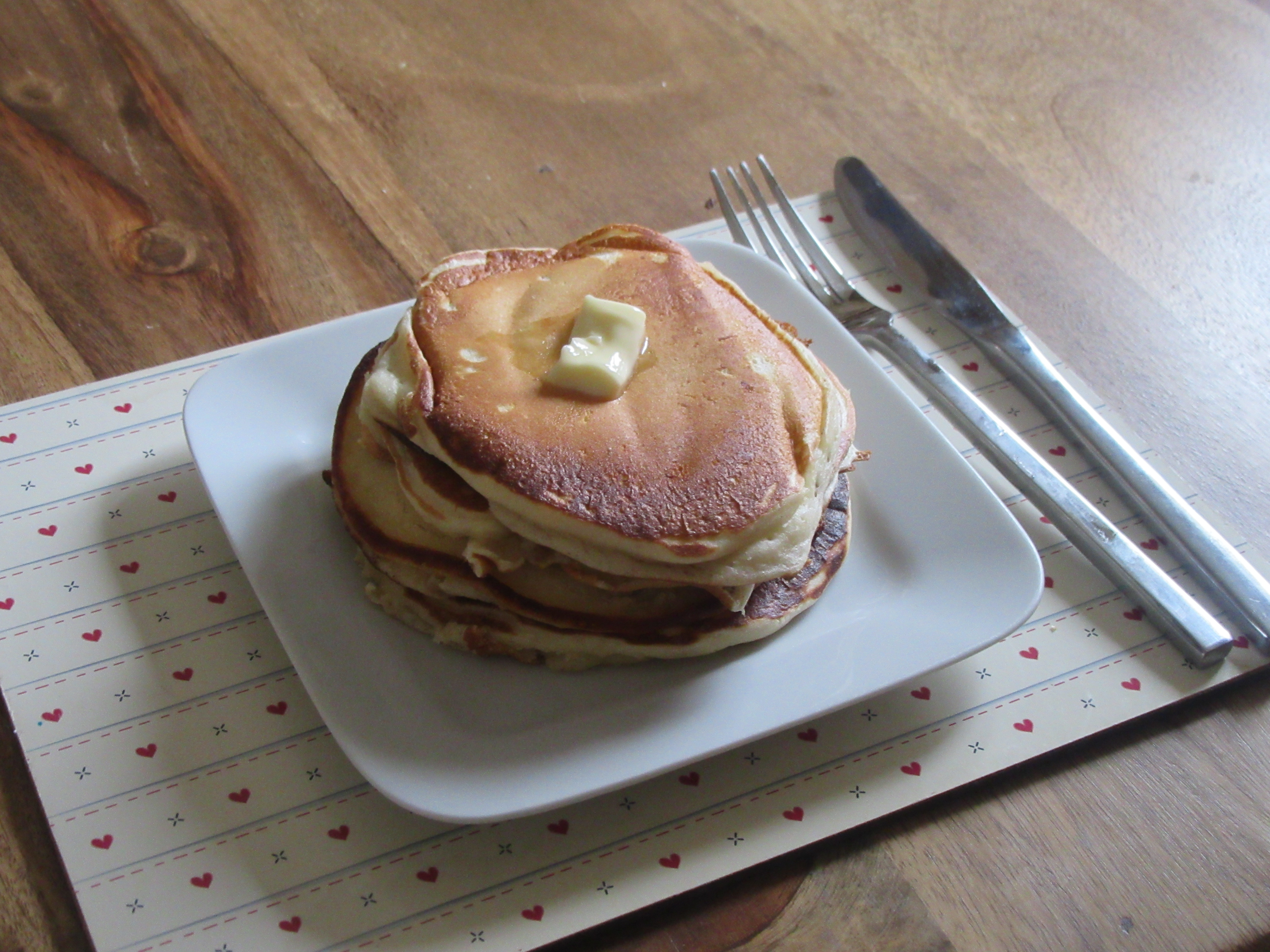
- Crempogau, made using the Anglesey recipe
- Alternative names: Ffroes
- Type: Pancake
- Place of origin: Wales, United Kingdom
- Main ingredients: batter

A crempog (plural: crempogau) is a Welsh pancake made with flour, buttermilk, eggs, vinegar and salted butter. Traditionally made on bakestones or griddles, the crempog is one of the oldest recipes in Wales. They are also known as ffroes, pancos and cramoth and are normally served thickly piled into a stack and spread with butter. It is traditionally served at celebrations in Wales, such as Shrove Tuesday and birthdays.

== Name ==
The word "crempog" has its origins in the Welsh language, but is similar to the Breton word krampouezh, which is also a type of pancake. Comparisons are often drawn between the two Celtic languages which share ancestry in the Brittonic language, though the krampouezh is more dainty than the crempog and is today closer to a crêpe than a pancake.

The English word crumpet may be derived from crempog or Cornish krampoeth.

== History ==
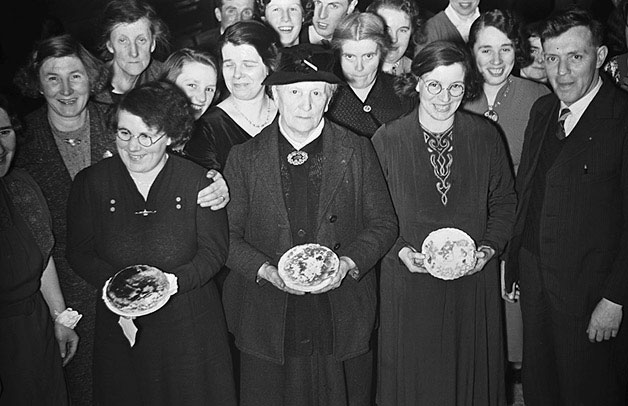
Women with crempogau at a traditional Shrove Tuesday Dance in Trewern (1940)

The history of food in Wales is poorly documented, and much of what is known lies in verbal and archaeological evidence. Wales has a long history of baking using a bakestone (Welsh: maen), a large round portable flatstone. The flagstone was replaced by a metal plate known as a gradell (griddle), and these appeared among the list of objects made by blacksmiths in the Laws of Hywel Dda (13th century). Bakestones were commonly used throughout rural Wales for making flatbreads with evidence of their use found in farmhouses and in the homes of landed gentry. Early flat stones were placed on a tripod over an open fire, though in many areas, especially in south-west Wales, a specially designed circular iron frame with a half hoop handle was used. By the early decades of the twentieth century built-in wall ovens were common throughout kitchens in Wales, though these would be wood and coal burning. The tradition of using a bakestone coexisted with these newer ovens. Heating the large ovens was generally confined to one day a week and was used to make bread and cakes to last the family until the next week. These were augmented with whatever could be cooked over the open fireplace using the bakestone. Common foods cooked using this method were cacen radell (griddle cake), bara crai' (unleavened bread), cacen gri (speckled cakes) and crempog.

Although there is no documented evidence of the earliest crempog recipe, the basic ingredients, readily available in Wales suggests a long history. The recipe for crempog reflects very old cookery traditions that were once common throughout Britain. Bobby Freeman, writing in 1980, states that crempog, along with cawl, is the one Welsh ingredient to have endured from past times. Despite crempog being a staple of Welsh cuisine due to its ease of preparation in past times, it is also connected to traditional celebrations. Crempog was served on Shrove Tuesday throughout Wales and was associated with birthdays, especially in south Wales, where the stack of pancakes are cut down in wedges and served like a cake.

== Preparation ==
For the standard crempog recipe, butter is melted in warm buttermilk and then poured into a well of flour and beaten. The mixture is meant to stand for a few hours. A second mixture is made using sugar, bicarbonate of soda, vinegar and beaten eggs. The mixtures are then combined to make a smooth, dense batter.

The thick batter is poured onto a hot bakestone or griddle, over a moderate heat. The crempog is cooked until golden on both sides and served in a stack with butter spread on each pancake.

== Variants ==
In Anglesey and Caernarfonshire crempogau were prepared as crempog furum, a pancake made with yeast, or crempug wen where the normally coarse flour was replaced with refined flour. These pancakes were meant for the family of the house with the servants of the house being served crempog surgeirch or bara bwff, an oatmeal-based pancake.

Although crempog is the term most commonly associated with Welsh pancakes they were known by different names around the country. Crempog was the term most often used in north Wales, while in parts of Carmarthenshire and Glamorgan they were known as cramwythen (singular: cramoth). In other parts of Glamorgan they were known as ffrosen (plural: ffroes), while in Cardiganshire they were called poncagen (plural: poncagau). In some areas of both Cardiganshire and Carmarthenshire they were known as pancosen.

As with most meals there are no specific recipe for crempog. The Glamorganshire ffroes are almost identical to Scottish pancakes (drop scones), which may have been brought to the region by Scottish labourers during the industrialization of the south Wales coalfields, but the piling of them into a stack smothered in butter harks to Welsh traditions.

== In poetry ==
A Welsh verse sung by children refers to crempogau:

Modryb Elin Enog
Os gwelwch chi'n dda ga i grempog?
Cew chithau de a siwgr brown
A phwdin lond eich ffedog
Modryb Elin Enog
Mae 'ngheg i'n grimp am grempog
Mae Mam rhy dlawd i brynu blawd
A Sian yn rhy ddiog i nol y triog
A 'nhad yn rhy wael i weithio
Os gwelwch chi'n dda ga i grempog

In English:

Auntie Elin Enog
Please may I have a pancake?
You can have tea and brown sugar
And your apron full of pudding
Auntie Elin Enog
My mouth is parched for pancakes
My mum is too poor to buy flour
And Sian is too lazy to get the treacle
And my father's too sick to work
Please may I have a pancake?

== See also ==
- Crumpet
- List of pancakes
- List of English words of Celtic origin
